= 2006 Iditarod =

Sled-dog race in Alaska, USA

34th Annual Iditarod Trail Sled Dog Race
- Venue: Iditarod Trail
- Location: Alaska
- Dates: March 4-15, 2006
- Competitors: 83

Champion
- Jeff King

The ceremonial start of the 34th annual (XXXIV) Iditarod Trail Sled Dog Race across the U.S. state of Alaska began amidst the crowds of Anchorage on March 4, 2006, and the start of the competitive race, or "restart", began the next day in Willow. The race followed a modified version of the northern route for 1,151 mi (1,852 km) across the Alaska Range, through the sparsely inhabited Interior, along the Yukon River, and then up the coast of the Bering Sea to the city of Nome. Unlike in previous years, where the teams had to deal with unseasonably warm temperatures and soft, mushy snow, the weather was cold, with temperatures reported as low as −40 °F (−40 °C).

Eighty three competitors started the race, eleven "scratched", and one was withdrawn from the race. The field of racers was extremely competitive, with pundits like Cabela's John Little listing more than half a dozen possible winners. The ultimate winner was Jeff King, who crossed under the "burled arch" on March 15, becoming one of the few four-time champions. Fellow four-time winner Doug Swingley of Montana came in 2nd place, followed by Paul Gebhardt. Each of the 83 teams was composed of 16 dogs, four of whom died during the event.

Note: All times are Alaska Standard Time/AKST (UTC-9).

== Competitors ==
There were 83 mushers that entered to race. The 51 Alaskans included four-time champion and speed-record holder Martin Buser, three-time winner Jeff King, 2004 winner Mitch Seavey, and the only five-time champion Rick Swenson, including a few Alaska Natives like Ramy Brooks, John Baker, and Ed Iten. There were 23 mushers as well from the lower 48 states, including four-time champion Doug Swingley.

Internationally, Canada is represented by three-time Yukon Quest winner Hans Gatt, Karen Ramstead, the owner of the only all-Siberian Husky team in the race, Sebastian Schnuelle, and rookie Warren Palfrey. Norway had three mushers in the race in that year, the 2005 rookie of the year, Bjørnar Andersen, and newcomers Tore Albrigtsen and Tove Sørensen (2005 champion Robert Sørlie is not racing this year). Fabrizio Lovati of Italy and Ben Valks of the Netherlands brought the European total to 5 mushers.

Celebrity mushers included Gary Paulsen, who ran his rookie race in 1983, scratched in 1985, withdrew prior to the race in 2005, and became the first musher to scratch in 2006, on March 6 at 1:08 a.m. at Skwentna. Legally blind musher Rachael Scdoris of Bend, Oregon, has also attempted the Iditarod for the second time, after she scratched in Eagle Island in 2005. Her visual interpreter for that year was Tim Osmar.

According to Iditarod reporter Little, the field was just as competitive as it was during the 2005 Iditarod, making it very hard to pick a winner. Former champions Buser, King, Swingley, and Seavey were all strong candidates to win. Of that elite crowd, King won the Kobuk 440 last year and the Kusko this year; while five-time winner Swenson, who scratched for the first time in 2005, is probably out of the running. The last of the likely winners is Bjørnar Andersen. As this year's representative of Team Norway, he inherited half of Robert Sørlie's winning 2005 team of dogs, and even without them Andersen's 4th-place finish in 2004 was the best finish by a rookie since the race first started in the 1970s.

Other racers who expected to finish well were Lance Mackey, who won the 1,000 mi (1,600 km) Yukon Quest, three-time runner up DeeDee Jonrowe, 2005's 2nd-place finisher Ed Iten, two-time runner up Ramy Brooks, perennial top-10er John Baker. A third tier of capable racers included winner of the 2005 Klondike 300 Cim Smyth (who also recorded the fastest time from Safety to Nome in 2005, despite only having 5 dogs left), Jessie Royner, winner of the 2005 Sheep Mountain 150 Ken Andersen, Aaron Burmeister, 2nd-place finisher in the 2005 Klondike 300 Matt Hayashida, Melanie Gould, Paul Gebhardt, and former Yukon Quest winner Aliy Zirkle. A win by either Aliy Zirkle or Lance Mackey would place them in the elite company of mushers to have won both the Yukon Quest and the Iditarod — in Lance's case, in the same year, an historical first. Hans Gatt is normally a contender, but this year he is running a team of young, inexperienced dogs.

Warren Palfrey of Yellowknife, Northwest Territories, Tore Albrigtsen or Tove Sorensen from Norway were likely candidates for rookie of the year.

== Awards ==
Doug Swingley won the PenAir Spirit of Alaska Award on March 8 at 0:12 a.m. for being the first to reach McGrath, on the bank of the Kuskokwim River. He was awarded a "spirit mask" by artist Orville Lind and US$500 in credit to cover travel or freight shipments at the checkpoint by PenAir's Chief Operating Officer, Danny Seybert.

Doug Swingley also won the CGI Dorothy Page Halfway Award on March 9 at 0:09 a.m. for being the first to reach Cripple, which is officially designated as the halfway point on even years when the northern route is run. He was awarded US$3,000 in gold nuggets at the checkpoint by CGI Logisitics' Rick Westbrook.

Paul Gebardt won the Millennium Alaskan Hotel's First to the Yukon Award on March 10 at 12:05 a.m. for being the first to reach Ruby, on the bank of the Yukon River. He was awarded US$3,500 in one-dollar bills at the checkpoint and had a gourmet seven-course meal prepared on a camp stove by Millennium Alaskan Hotel's Executive Chef Stephen England and Food and Beverage Director Brooke McGrath. The "Yukon Fox" Emmitt Peters, 1975 winner of the Iditarod and Ruby native, participated.

Jeff King won the Wells Fargo Gold Coast Award on March 12 at 12:26 p.m. for being the first to reach Unalakleet, an Inupiaq Eskimo community on the Norton Sound of the Bering Sea. He was awarded the Gold Coast trophy and US$2,500 in gold at the checkpoint by Wells Fargo' Community Banking President for Nome and Kotzebue, Jennifer Imus.

Jeff King won the XXXIV Iditarod on March 15, at 1:11:36 a.m. for being the first to reach the Burled Arch in Nome. He was awarded US$69,000 by Wells Fargo, and a 2006 pickup from Anchorage Chrysler Dodge. Only King, Martin Buser, Susan Butcher, and Doug Swingley have won the race four times; and only Rick Swenson has won it five times. At 50 years of age, King also became the oldest musher to win the race.

Mike Jayne won the Rookie of the Year Race on March 16 at 3:07:15 a.m. for being the first rookie to reach the finish. He arrived in 25th place, beating out Tove Sorensen, who finished in 28th and 29th place, both at 4:30:30 a.m.. Jayne beat five-time winner Rick Swenson, who finished his 30th Iditarod at 3:27:30 a.m. in 26th position, his worst place ever. Swenson is a member of the Iditarod Trail Committee board of directors, and has been making intimations of retirement.

Glenn Lockwood received the red lantern award for being the last to finish the race.

The awards will be presented again to the winners during the Awards Banquet at the Nome Recreation Center on March 19.

== Scratches ==
Eleven mushers "scratched" (withdrew from the race):

1. Gary Paulsen was in 62nd place when he scratched on March 6 at 5:30 a.m. in Skwentna for "personal reasons"
2. Lori Townsend was in 44th place when she scratched on March 6 at 9:40 p.m. in Rainy Pass due to a possible rib injury.
3. Sandy McKee was in 78th place when she scratched on March 7 at 8:00 p.m. in Rainy Pass.
4. Rookie Sue Morgan from Richmond, Utah, was in 78th place when she scratched on March 8 at 8:00 a.m. in Rainy Pass due to a possible cracked rib.
5. Terry Adkins of Sand Coulee, Montana, was in 67th place when he scratched on March 10 at 10:15 a.m. in Takotna.
6. Rich Larson of Sand Coulee, Montana was in 69th place when he scratched on March 10 at 11:15 a.m. in McGrath due to the "lack of leaders in his team"
7. Richard Hum of Talkeetna, Alaska, scratched on March 10 at 11:20 a.m. in McGrath "because his team was young".
8. Jim Warren of Linwood, Michigan, scratched on March 10 at 12:07 p.m. in Takotna "based on well being of his remaining young team".
9. Matt Hayashida of Willow, Alaska scratched on March 11 at 7:45 a.m. in Cripple "based on the well being of his dog team".
10. Veteran Iditarod competitor John Barron of Helmsville, Montana, scratched on March 11 at 3:00 p.m. in Galena "because his team was sick".
11. Dave Tresino scratched on March 11 at 4:30 p.m. in Cripple due to a "lack of leaders".

One musher was withdrawn from the race. Withdrawing a musher is at the sole discretion of Race Marshall Mark Nordman:

1. Ben Valks of the Netherlands was withdrawn from the race after arriving in Shaktoolik on March 18 at 4:00 p.m. as the red lantern in last place. According to Norman's report, "Valks had taken good care of his team and himself throughout the race, but that in his judgment Valks' team was no longer considered competitive".

== Canine fatalities ==
Each of the 83 teams was composed of 16 dogs at the start of the competitive race in Willow. Mushers are allowed to drop dogs at any checkpoint, usually because of concern over their performance, but also or for their health. Veterinarians examine the dogs at each checkpoint, and also have the discretion to withdraw dogs. Dropped dogs are flown to Anchorage or Nome, where they are provided with medical care. Teams are usually reduced to between 9 and 12 dogs by the time they arrived in Nome.

An average of 3 dogs die each year. A necropsy by a board certified veterinary pathologist is conducted after every fatality to determine the cause of death.

1. Yellowknife, a 4-year-old male from Noah Burmeister's team, died on March 9 at 6:00 a.m.. Yellowknife was initially dropped at Rohn on March 7, and was provided medical care in Anchorage. The preliminary necropsy indicated pneumonia as the cause of death.
2. Bear, a 3-year-old male from David Sawatzsky's team, died on March 11 between Cripple and Ruby. The gross necropsy found no abnormalities.
3. Cupid, a 4-year-old female from Jim Lanier's team, died on March 12 between Galena and Nulato. The gross necropsy found regurgitation and aspiration were the likely cause of death, and secondarily gastric ulcers.
4. Jack, a 5-year-old male from Wisconsin musher Ron Cortte's team, died on March 18 at White Mountain. Jack was examined by veterinarians on arrival and appeared normal, but died of unknown causes 30 min later.

== Route ==
The race ran over the Alaska Range, where an avalanche claimed the life of Richard Strick Jr. in mid-February, into the former Gold Rush country of the Alaska Interior, past Athabaskan villages. Since 2006 is an even numbered year, the race followed the northern route from Ophir, past the halfway point at Cripple, before rejoining the main route at Kaltag, on the Yukon River. From Kaltag the race swings west to the Norton Sound, on coast of the Bering Sea.

=== March 4: Ceremonial start in Anchorage ===
Ceremonial start at Anchorage: The mushers departed Anchorage on March 4, 2006. A large crowd watched as 83 teams composed of a musher and twelve dogs pulling a dogsled, left the starting chute at the corner of Fourth and D Streets, and followed the 11 mi (18 km) route through the urban center. The mushers were accompanied on the sled by "Idita-riders", the high bidders in a pre-race auction.

Eagle River: After the mushers arrived at Eagle River, the dogs were transported by vehicle to the "restart" location. Normally this is at Wasilla, the headquarters of the Iditarod Trail Committee, and the race continues from there to the next checkpoint at Knik, before reaching Yentna Station. In 2006, the restart was pushed back to Willow, and continued on directly to Yentna, skipping Wasilla and Knik entirely.

=== March 5: Restart at Willow ===
Restart at Willow: The mushers departed the Community of Willow two minutes apart, in Bib order. The first musher (Loni Townsend, Bib 2) left on March 5 at 2:00 p.m. AKST, and the last (Paul Gebhardt, Bib 83) left 2 hr 44 min later at 4:44 p.m. The teams were increased to 16 dogs each. No additional dogs could be added, but they could be left behind at any of the checkpoints along the route.

Yentna: Four-time winner Doug Swingley departed Yentna in first place, on March 5 at 5:35 p.m.. The remainder of the top 5 were Bryan Bearss (at 5:42 p.m.), Jim Lanier (5:47 p.m.), Lori Townsend (5:48 p.m.), and Jessie Royer (5:51 p.m.). The top 10 departed within 35 min (by 6:10 p.m.), the top 20 within 1 hr 2 min (by 6:37 p.m.), and the last within 8 hr 49 min (by March 6 at 2:24 a.m.). The last to leave, in 83rd place was Ben Valks.

Skwentna: Bryan Bearss departed Skwentna in first place, on March 5 at 9:19 p.m.. The remainder of the top 5 were Ramy Brooks (at 9:46 p.m.), Melanie Gould (9:50 p.m.), Ramey Smyth (10:19 p.m.), and three-time winner Jeff King (10:21 p.m.). The top 10 departed within 2 hr 24 min (by 11:43 p.m.), the top 20 within 4 hr 54 min (by March 6, at 2:13 p.m.), and the last within 17 hr 30 min (by March 6 at 2:49 p.m.). The red lantern in 82nd place was Ben Valks, after Gary Paulsen scratched.

=== March 6: Alaska Range ===
Finger Lake: John Baker departed Finger Lake in first place, on March 6 at 9:15 a.m.. The remainder of the top 5 were fellow Alaska Native Ramy Brooks (at 9:31 a.m.), Doug Swingley (9:32 a.m.), Jeff King (9:53 a.m.), and Melanie Gould (10:00 a.m.). The top 10 departed within 1 hr 9 min (by 10:24 a.m.), the top 20 within 2 hr 55 min (by 12:10 p.m.), and the last within 1 day 0 hr 16 min (by March 7 at 9:31 a.m.). The red lantern in 82d place was Ben Valks.

Rainy Pass: Ramey Smyth departed Rainy Pass in first place, on March 6 at 2:46 p.m.. The remainder of the top 5 were Jessica Hendricks (at 6:18 p.m., 3 hr 32 min later), Lance Mackey (6:19 p.m.), the Norwegian Bjørnar Andersen (6:38 p.m.), and Paul Gebhardt (6:40 p.m.). The top 10 departed within 4 hr 42 min (by 7:28 p.m.), the top 20 within 5 hr 44 min (by 8:30 p.m.), and the last within 1 day 20 hr 32 min (by March 8 at 11:18 a.m.). The red lantern in 79th place was Ben Valks, after Lori Townsend, Sandy McKee, and Sue Morgan scratched.

Rohn: Doug Swingley departed Rohn in first place, on March 6 at 10:45 p.m.. The remainder of the top 5 were Jeff King (at 11:23 p.m.), Ramy Brooks (11:59 p.m.), Aliy Zirkle (March 7 at 0:11 a.m.), and 2004 winner Mitch Seavey (0:15 a.m.). The top 10 departed within 2 hr 46 min (by March 7 at 1:31 a.m.), the top 20 within 6 hr 5 min (by 4:50 a.m.), and the last within 2 days 3 hr 43 min (by March 9 at 2:28 a.m.). The red lantern in 79th place was Ben Valks.

=== March 7: Alaska Interior ===
Nikolai: Doug Swingley departed Nikolai in first place, on March 7 at 7:09 p.m.. The remainder of the top 5 were Jeff King (at 7:15 p.m.), Aliy Zirkle (7:45 p.m.), Ed Iten (8:46 p.m.), and Mitch Seavey (8:55 p.m.). The top 10 departed within 2 hr 16 min (by 9:25 p.m.), the top 20 within 4 hr 53 min (by March 8 at 0:02 a.m.), and the last within 2 days 15 hr 54 min (by March 10 at 11:03 a.m.). The red lantern in 79th place was Ben Valks.

=== March 8 ===
McGrath: Doug Swingley departed McGrath in first place, on March 8 at 0:18 a.m.. The remainder of the top 5 were Jeff King (at 0:47 a.m.), Aliy Zirkle (2:21 a.m.), three-time runner up DeeDee Jonrowe (3:33 a.m.), and John Baker (5:13 a.m.). The top 10 departed within 6 hr 2 min (by 6:20 a.m.), the top 20 within 9 hr 14 min (by 9:32 a.m.), and the last within 3 days 8 hr 56 min (by March 11 at 9:14 a.m.). The red lantern in 77th place was Trent Herbst, after Richard Hum and Rick Larson scratched.

Takotna: Doug Swingley departed Takotna in first place, on March 8 at 8:19 a.m.. The remainder of the top 5 were Jason Barron, Mitch Seavey, John Barron (all three departed at 11:00 a.m.), and Ed Iten (11:08 a.m.). The top 10 departed within 5 hr 28 min (by 1:47 p.m.), the top 20 within 20 hr 29 min (by March 9 at 4:48 a.m.), and the last within 3 days 14 hr 48 min (by March 11 at 11:07 p.m.). The red lantern in 75th place was Ben Valks, after Terry Adkins and Jim Warren scratched.

Ophir: Doug Swingley departed Ophir in first place, on March 8 at 11:01 a.m.. The remainder of the top 5 were DeeDee Jonrowe (at 4:55 p.m.), Cim Smyth (4:58 p.m.), John Baker (5:26 p.m.), and Paul Gebhardt (6:35 p.m.). The top 10 departed within 19 hr 46 min (by March 9 at 6:46 a.m.), the top 20 within 28 hr 00 min (by March 9 at 3:01 p.m.), and the last within 3 days 15 hr 44 min (by March 12 at 2:45 a.m.). The red lantern in 75th place was Ben Valks.

=== March 9: Halfway ===
Cripple: Paul Gebhardt departed Cripple in first place, on March 9 at 1:48 p.m.. The remainder of the top 5 were Jeff King (at 10:45 p.m., 6 hr 57 min later), Aliy Zirkle (11:43 p.m.), Doug Swingley (March 10 at 3:05 a.m.), and Aaron Butmeister (March 10 at 4:34 a.m.). The top 10 departed within 17 hr 52 min (March 10 at 7:40 a.m.), the top 20 within 19 hr 13 min (by March 10 at 10:01 a.m.), and the last within 3 days 22 hr 14 min (by March 13 at 12:02 p.m.). The red lantern in 73rd place was Ben Valks, after Matt Hayashide and Dave Tresino scratched.

=== March 10: Yukon River ===
Ruby: Paul Gebardt departed Ruby in first place, on March 10 at 8:34 a.m.. The remainder of the top 5 were Jeff King (at 4:01 p.m.), Doug Swingley (7:45 p.m.), DeeDee Jonrowe (9:09 p.m.), and Aliy Zirkle (11:00 p.m.). The top 10 departed within 16 hr 22 min (by March 11 at 0:56 a.m.), the top 20 within 20 hr 38 min (by March 11 at 5:12 a.m.), and the last within 4 days 6 hr 27 min (by March 14 at 3:01 p.m.). The red lantern in 73rd place was Ben Valks.

=== March 11 ===
Galena: Jeff King departed Galena in first place, on March 11 at 3:28 a.m.. The remainder of the top 5 were Doug Swingley (at 7:52 a.m.), Mitch Seavey (8:00 a.m.), Ed Iten (8:17 a.m.), and Jason Barron (also 8:17 a.m.). The top 10 departed within 8 hr 10 min (by 11:38 a.m.), the top 20 within 14 hr 5 min (by 5:33 p.m.), and the last within 4 days 6 hr 28 min (by March 15 at 9:56 a.m.). The red lantern in 72nd place was Ben Valks, after John Barron scratched.

Nulato: Jeff King departed Nulato in first place again, on March 11 at 1:06 p.m.. The remainder of the top 5 were Doug Swingley (at 1:27 p.m.), DeeDee Jonrowe (3:27 p.m.), Lance Mackey (7:58 p.m.), and Paul Gebhardt (8:42 p.m.). The top 10 departed within 8 hr 26 min (by 9:32 p.m.), the top 20 within 16 hr 52 min (by March 12, at 5:58 a.m.), and the last within 4 days 10 hr 27 min (by March 15 at 11:33 p.m.). The red lantern in 72nd place was Ben Valks.

=== March 12: Bering Sea ===
Kaltag: Jeff King departed Kaltag in first place for the third straight checkpoint, on March 12 at 0:21 a.m.. The remainder of the top 5 were Doug Swingley (at 0:57 a.m.), DeeDee Jonrowe (3:30 a.m.), Aliy Zirkle (3:37 a.m.), and John Baker (7:33 a.m.). The top 10 departed within 9 hr 9 min (by 9:30 a.m.), the top 20 within 15 hr 49 min (by 4:10 p.m.), and the last within 4 days 13 hr 29 min (by March 16 at 1:50 p.m.). The red lantern in 72nd place was Ben Valks.

Unalakleet: Jeff King departed Unalakleet in first place again, on March 12 at 6:50 p.m.. The remainder of the top 5 were Doug Swingley (at 8:40 p.m.), DeeDee Jonrowe (March 13 at 0:48 a.m.), Bjørnar Andersen (2:52 a.m.), and John Baker (2:54 a.m.). The top 10 departed within 12 hr 7 min (by 6:57 a.m.), the top 20 within 19 hr 43 min (by 2:33 p.m.), and the last within 5 days 1 hr 49 min (by March 17 at 8:39 p.m.). The red lantern in 72nd place was Ben Valks.

=== March 13 ===
Shaktoolik: Jeff King departed Shaktoolik in first place, on March 13 at 5:22 a.m.. The remainder of the top 5 were Doug Swingley (at 8:03 a.m.), Paul Gebhardt (8:44 a.m.), DeeDee Jonrowe(10:37 a.m.), and Bjørnar Andersen (12:27 p.m.). The top 10 departed within 11 hr 23 min (by 4:45 p.m.), the top 20 within 16 hr 53 min (by 10:15), and the last within 5 days 6 hr 55 min (by March 18 at 12:17 p.m.). The red lantern in 71st place was Katrina Pawlaczyk, after Ben Valks scratched.

Koyuk: Jeff King departed Koyuk in first place, on March 13 at 3:51 p.m.. The remainder of the top 5 were Doug Swingley (at 7:16 p.m.), Paul Gebhardt (9:33 p.m.), DeeDee Jonrowe (9:35 p.m.), and Aliy Zirkle (9:42 p.m.). The top 10 departed within 12 hr 12 min (by March 14 at 4:03 a.m.), and the top 20 within 19 hr 1 min (by 10:52 a.m.).

Elim: Jeff King departed Elim in first place, on March 13 at 10:23 p.m.. The remainder of the top 5 were Doug Swingley (March 14 at 2:19 a.m.), DeeDee Jonrowe (5:19 a.m.), Paul Gebhardt (5:27 a.m.), and John Baker (6:01 a.m.). The top 10 departed within 14 hr 7 min (by 12:30 p.m.), and the top 20 within 19 hr 8 min (by 5:31 p.m.).

=== March 14 ===
White Mountain: Jeff King departed White Mountain in first place, on March 14 at 2:34 p.m.. The remainder of the top 5 were Doug Swingley (at 5:41 p.m.), Paul Gebhardt (8:00 p.m.), DeeDee Jonrowe (8:29 p.m.), and John Baker (9:14 p.m.). The top 10 departed within 12 hr 33 min (by March 15 at 3:07 a.m.), and the top 20 within 18 hr 26 min (by 9:00 a.m.).

Safety: Jeff King departed Safety in first place, on March 14 at 9:53 p.m.. The remainder of the top 5 were Doug Swingley (March 15 at 0:57 a.m.), Paul Gebardt (2:31 a.m.), DeeDee Jonrowe(3:23 a.m.), and John Baker (4:31 a.m.). The top 10 departed within 11 hr 38 min (by 9:31 a.m.), and the top 20 within 17 hr 57 min (by 2:50 p.m.).

=== March 15: Burled arch ===
Nome: Jeff King passed under the "burled arch" on Front Street in Nome in first place, on March 15 at 1:11 a.m.. The remainder of the top 5 were Doug Swingley (at 4:18 a.m.), Paul Gebhardt (5:23 a.m.), DeeDee Jonrowe (6:25 a.m.), and John Baker (7:37 a.m.). The top 10 arrived within 10 hr 57 min (12:08 p.m.), and the top 20 within 18 hr 14 min (by 6:31 p.m.).
