= 2007 Iditarod =

Sled-dog race in Alaska, USA

35th Annual Iditarod Trail Sled Dog Race
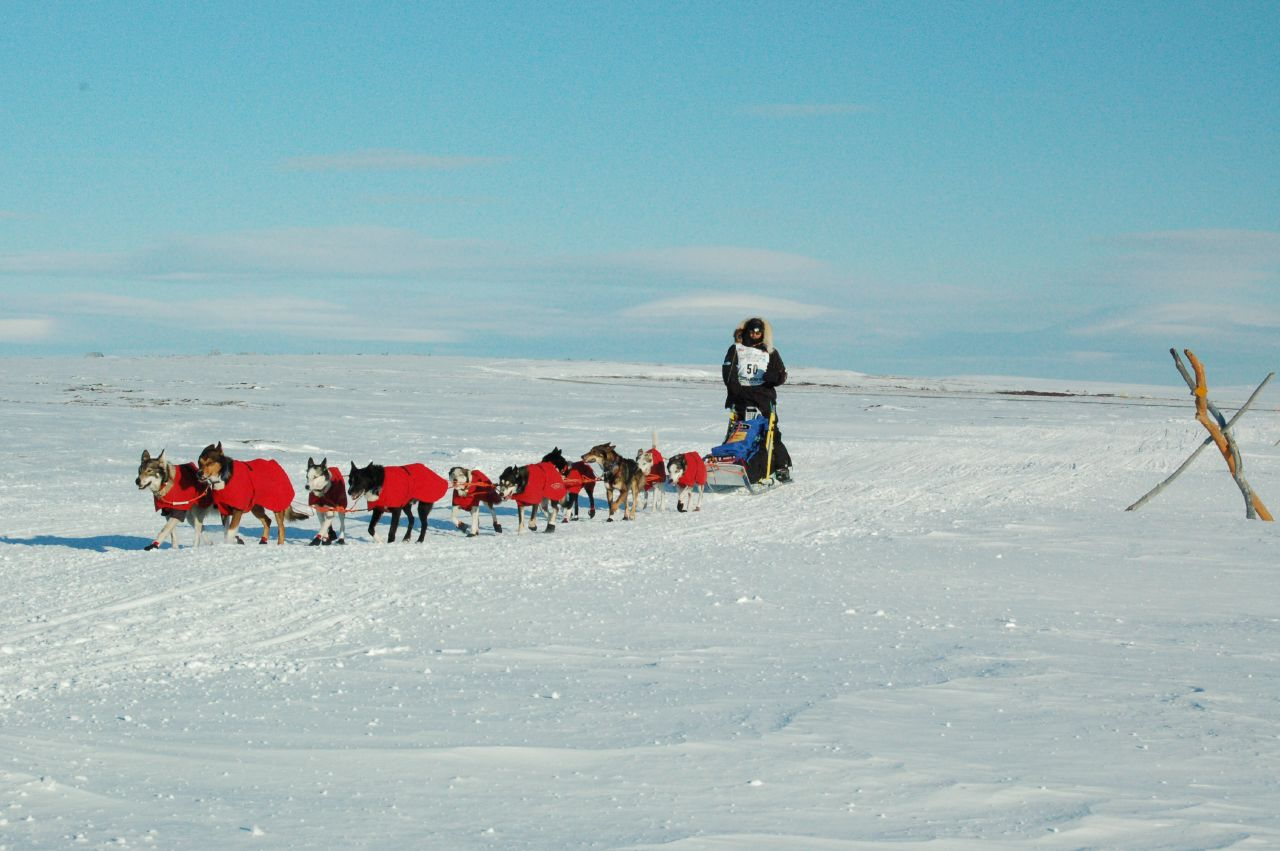
- Robert Sørlie's team near Nome, Alaska
- Venue: Iditarod Trail
- Location: Alaska
- Dates: March 3-13, 2007
- Competitors: 82

Champion
- Lance Mackey

The ceremonial start of the 35th annual Iditarod Trail Sled Dog Race across the U.S. state of Alaska began amidst the crowds of Anchorage at 10 am (AKST) on March 3, 2007, and the start of the competitive race, or "restart", began at 2 pm the next day in Willow. The race followed the southern route for 1,151 mi (1,852 km) across the Alaska Range, through the sparsely inhabited Interior, along the Yukon River, and then up the coast of the Bering Sea to the city of Nome.

Eighty two competitors started the race. Denali, Alaska musher Jeff King returned to defend his 2006 win, and the 2005 Iditarod winner Norwegian Robert Sørlie returned after skipping the 2006 event. Both were strong favorites to win. Other contenders included 4 time winners Martin Buser and Doug Swingley. However, the race was won by Lance Mackey in 9 days, 5:08:41, with an average speed of 5.07 mph (8.16 km/h).

== Route ==
Ceremonial start
Anchorage to Campbell Airstrip: (11 mi (18 km)
Highway
Campbell Airstrip to Willow: 59 mi (95 km)
Restart
Willow to Yetna: 45 mi (72 km)
See Iditarod Trail Sled Dog Race for rest of route
Modified distance: 1,161 miles (1,868 km)

=== March 3: Ceremonial start in Anchorage ===
Ceremonial start at Anchorage: The mushers departed Anchorage on March 3, 2007. One of the largest crowds ever watched as 82 teams composed of a musher and twelve dogs pulling a dogsled, left the starting chute at the corner of Fourth and D Streets, and followed the 11 mi (18 km) route through the urban center to Campbell Air Strip. The mushers were accompanied on the sled by "Idita-riders", the high bidders in a pre-race auction.

Campbell Airstrip: After the mushers arrive at Campbell Airstrip, the dogs are transported by vehicle to the "restart" location at Willow.

=== March 4: Restart at Willow ===
Restart at Willow: The mushers departed the Community of Willow two minutes apart, in Bib order. The first musher (Perry Solmonson, Bib 2) left on March 4 at 2:00 pm AKST, and the last (Jeremy Keller, bib 820) left 2 hr 42 min later at 4:42 pm. The teams were increased to 16 dogs each. No additional dogs could be added, but they could be left behind at any of the checkpoints along the route.

Yentna: Ramy Brooks (bib 5) departed Yentna in first place on March 4 at 5:20 pm. the remainder of the top 5 were Jim Lanier, Zack Steer, Cim Smyth, and Paul Gebhardt

Skwentna: Aaron Burmeister who started in 47th position departed Skwentna in first place, on March 4 at 9:44 pm. The remainder of the top 5 were Robert Sorlie, Jason Barron, Rick Swenson, and three-time Yukon Quest champion Lance Mackey.

=== March 5: Alaska Range ===
Finger Lake: Four-time Iditarod winner and course record holder Martin Buser departed Finger Lake in first place, on March 5 at 4:35 am AKST. The remainder of the top 5 were Zack Steer, Jim Lanier, Cim Smyth, and Sebastian Schnuele. The field dropped to 79 teams after Butch Austin, Frank Sihler, and Jeff Holt scratched from the race.

Rainy Pass: Cim Smyth departed Rainy Pass at 10:05 AM AKST in first place. The remainder of the top five were Lance Mackey, Aliy Zirkle, Tim Osmar, and Ramey Smith.

Poor trail and weather conditions caused eleven teams to scratch from the race. Doug Swingley and Dee Dee Jonrowe scratched on March 5. Lachlan Clark, Richard Cummins, Melanie Gould, Richard Hum, and Jacques Philip scratched on March 6. Tom Roig, Dan Huttunen, Perry Solmonson, and Scott White scratched on March 7. There were 68 teams remaining in the race.

Rohn: Jason Barron departed the checkpoint at the Rohn roadhouse at 8:47 PM AKST in first place. The remainder of the top five were Cim Smyth, Lance Mackey, Zack Steer, and Martin Buser.

The field dropped to 66 teams when G.B. Jones and Deborah Molburg Bicknell scratched from the race on March 9.

=== March 6: Alaskan Interior ===
Nikolai: Lance Mackey arrived in Nikolai in first place at 8:10 am AKST on March 6. He was followed by Paul Gebhardt (11:05 am), Zack Steer (11:48 am), Aliy Zirkle (11:48 am), and Jason Barron (12:34 pm).

Martin Buser departed the checkpoint in first place at 1:43 pm after only stopping for three minutes. He was followed by Lance Mackey (3:33 pm), Zack Steer (5:02 pm), Jeff King (5:12 pm), and Jason Barron (5:37 pm)

The field dropped to 65 teams when Ben Stamm scratched on March 8.

McGrath: Martin Buser arrived in McGrath at 6:47 pm and claimed the PenAir Spirit of Alaska award for being first to McGrath. He was followed by Lance Mackey (8:22 pm), Zack Steer (9:50 pm), Jeff King (10:46 pm), and Jason Barron (11:22 pm). Mackey departed McGrath fifteen minutes later at 8:37 pm in first place. He was followed by Zack Steer (10:01 pm), Jeff King (10:55 pm), Jason Barron (11:25), and Paul Gebhardt (11:34 pm)

The field dropped to 64 teams when Dave Tresino scratched in McGrath on March 9.

=== March 7 ===
Takotna: Lance Mackey arrived in Takotna at 10:52 pm AKST on March 6 in first place. He was followed by Zack Steer (12:05 am, March 7), Jeff King (1:14 am), Jason Barron (1:38 am), and Paul Gebhardt (1:52 am). Zack Steer left Takotna 4 minutes later at 12:09 am in first place. He was followed by Jeff King (1:27 am), Martin Buser (2:21 am), Lance Mackey (04:14 am), and Paul Gebhardt (8:13 am).

Ophir: Zack Steer arrived in Ophir at 2:47 am in first place. He was followed by Jeff King at 4:05 am, Martin Buser at 4:33 am, Lance Mackey at 6:50 am, and Paul Gebhardt at 10:17 am. The rest of the top 10 arrived within 9 hours and 11 minutes of the leader. Lance Mackey left Ophir in first place at same time he arrived at 6:50 am. He was followed by Paul Gebhardt at 10:24 am, Mitch Seavey at 12:45 pm, Ed Iten at 12:46, and Cim Smyth at 2:50 pm

=== March 8: Halfway ===
Iditarod: Lance Mackey arrived in the ghost town of Iditarod in first place at 12:11 am. He won the GCI Dorothy Page Halfway Award and $4,000 in placer gold nuggets. He was followed by Paul Gebhardt at 12:17 am, Ed Iten at 6:22 am, Mitch Seavey at 6:24 am, and Tollef Monson at 8:00 am. The rest of the top ten arrived within 7 hours and 22 minutes of Mackey's time. The top twenty arrived within 28 hours and 32 minutes of Mackey's time

Zack Steer departed Iditarod at 9:28 pm in first place after staying for only 10 minutes. He was followed by Martin Buser at 10:48 pm, Jeff King at 12:21 am on March 9, Lance Mackey at 2:31 am, and Paul Gebhardt at 2:44 am. The rest of the top ten departed within 11 hours and 42 minutes of Steer's time

The field dropped to 63 teams when Linwood Fielder scratched from the race on March 9.

=== March 9: Yukon River ===
Shageluk: Martin Buser arrived in Shageluk in first place at 06:55 am and departed thirteen minutes later at 07:08 am. Jeff King arrived in Shageluk at 08:35 am and departed three minutes later at 08:38 am. An hour and half later, Lance Mackey arrived at 10:02 am and departs three minutes later at 10:05 am. Eight minutes later, Paul Gebhardt arrived at 11:13 am and departed at 11:15 am

Anvik: Martin Buser arrived in Anvik on the Yukon River at 10:45 am in first place and was awarded the First Musher to the Yukon Award which consists of a seven course meal and $3,500 in cash. He was followed by Jeff King, Lance Mackey, Paul Gebhardt and Ramy Brooks at 12:00 pm, 1:22 pm, 1:28 pm and 5:05 pm respectively.

Martin Buser departed Anvik in first after taking his mandatory eight-hour layover at 6:45 pm. Heff departed Anvik in second after his eight-hour layover at 8:00 pm. Zack Steer departed Anvik in third after staying three minutes at 8:18 pm. Lance Mackey and Paul Gebhardt departed Anvik after taking their eight-hour layover at 9:22 pm and 9:28 pm.

Grayling: Martin Buser, Jeff King, Zack Steer, Lance Mackey, and Paul Gebhardt arrived in Grayling at 9:04 pm, 10:22 pm, 10:47 pm, 11:51 pm, and 12:01 am (March 10) respectively.

Martin Buser, Jeff King, Lance Mackey, Paul Gebhardt, and Ramy Brooks departed Grayling at 9:06 pm, 10:32 pm, 11:56 pm, and 3:42 am (March 10). Zack Steer departed in sixth place at 4:47 am on March 10.

=== March 10 ===
Eagle Island: Martin Buser and Jeff King arrived in Eagle Island at 6:30 am AKST and 7:50 am respectively. An hour and a half later, Paul Gebhardt and Lance Mackey arrived one minute apart at 9:34 am and 9:35 am. Zack Steer arrived 3 hours and 9 minutes later at 12:44 pm

Jeff King left Eagle Island at 12:55 pm and was followed by Martin Buser at 1:00 pm. Lance Mackey and Paul departed Eagle Island two minutes apart at 3:43 pm and 3:45 pm. Ken Anderson departed at 8:35 am Zack Steer took his 8-hour layover and departed at 8:44 pm in sixth position.

Kaltag: Jeff King arrived in Kaltag at 9:23 pm in first place. Martin Buser arrived 52 minutes later at 10:15 pm. Lance Mackey and Paul Gebhardt arrived one minute apart at 12:05 am and 12:06. Ken Anderson arrived at 5:36 am AKDT. Zack Steer arrived at 5:48 am.

Jeff King departed Kaltag at 4:46 am in first place. Martin Buser departed 13 minutes later at 4:59 am. Paul Gebhardt and Lance Mackey departed six minutes apart at 6:23 and 6:28 am. Zack Steer departed 4 hours and 18 hours later at 10:46 pm.

=== March 11: Bering Sea ===
Unalakleet: Jeff King arrived in the village of Unalakleet in first place at 3:35 pm. He was awarded the Wells Fargo "Gold Coast" Award and $2,500 in gold for being first to Norton Sound. Lance Mackey arrived 45 minutes later at 4:20 pm with Martin Buser and Paul Gebhardt arriving within 7 minutes behind him. Zack Steer arrived four hours and 31 minutes later at 8:58 pm.

Gebhardt was the first to depart the checkpoint at 9:00 pm. Mackey departed nineteen minutes later at 9:19 pm. Buser and King departed within two minutes of each other at 9:43 pm and 9:45 pm, respectively. Steer departed the checkpoint at 2:16 am on March 12.

=== March 12 ===
Shaktoolik:

Koyuk:

Elim:

=== March 13: Dash to the Finish ===
White Mountain: Lance Mackey arrived in White Mountain first place at 1:46 am AKDT. Paul Gebhardt arrived 2 hours and 38 minutes later at 4:16 am. Martin Buser arrived 5 hours and 29 minutes later at 9:45 am. Zack Steer arrived 20 minutes later at 10:05 am. Jeff King arrived 1 hour and 28 minutes later at 11:33 am.

Mackey, Gebhart, Buser, Steer, and King departed White Mountain after serving their mandatory 8-hour layovers at 9:46 am, 12:16 pm, 5:45 pm, 6:05 pm, and 7:33 pm respectively.

Safety: Mackey arrives in Safety in 4:49 pm AKDT in first and departed five minutes later at 4:54 pm. Gebhardt arrived in second place at 7:08 pm and departed four minutes later at 7:11 pm. On March 14, Steer and Buser arrived two minutes apart at 12:36 and 12:38 pm respectively. Steer departed at 12:37 am and Buser departed at 12:41 am. Two hours later, Jeff King arrived at 2:38 am and departed four minutes later at 2:42 pm.

Nome: Mackey arrived under the burled arch in Nome in first place at 8:08:41 pm with a time of 9 days, 5 hours, 8 minutes, and 41 seconds. He is awarded $69,000 and a brand new Dodge pick-up truck. He was the first musher to win the Yukon Quest and the Iditarod in the same year. Gebhardt finished second two hours and 28 minutes later at 10:28:12 pm with a time of 9 days, 7 hours, 28 minutes, and 12 seconds. Steer finished third five hours and 48 minutes later at 03:46:07 with a time of 9 days, 12 hours, 46 minutes, and 7 seconds. Buser finished fourth 21 minutes after Steer at 04:07:04 with a time of 9 days, 13 hours, 7 minutes, and 4 seconds. King finished fifth two hours later at 06:05:17 am with a time of 9 days, 15 hours, 5 minutes, and 17 seconds.

== Scratches ==
Twenty-three mushers were scratched from the race:

1. Four-time champion Doug Swingley scratched in Rainy Pass on March 5, 2007 at 12:36 pm AKST due to broken ribs and a dislocated thumb.
2. Jeff Holt scratched in Finger Lake at 5:03 pm AKST. Holt "said he was approaching Finger Lake when he felt a sharp pain, extreme discomfort and blacked out."
3. Two-time runner-up Dee Dee Jonrowe scratched in Rainy Pass at 6:00 pm AKST on March 5, 2007 due to breaking her little finger
4. Butch Austin scratched in Finger Lake on March 6, 2007 at 8:00 am AKST "due to injuries incurred before the race began."
5. Frank Sihler scratched in Finger Lake on March 6, 2007 at 8:00 am AKST due to "a lack of leaders on his team."
6. Jacques Philip scratched in Rainy Pass on March 6, 2007 at 8:00 am AKST. No official reason was given. However, in an interview with the Anchorage Daily News, race judge Art Church reported that Philip "just wasn't having any fun out there."
7. Lachlan Clark scratched in Rainy Pass on March 6, 2007 at 11:00 am AKST due to a torn "ligament in his ankle."
8. Melanie Gould scratched in Rainy Pass on March 6, 2007 at 11:00 am AKST. Her "sled was damaged beyond repair during her trek from Finger Lake to Rainy Pass."
9. Randy Cummins scratched in Rainy Pass on March 6, 2007 at 3:00 pm AKST due to a "shoulder injury and damage to his sled."
10. Richard Hum scratched in Rainy Pass on March 6, 2007 at 5:15 pm ASKT. No official reason was given.
11. Tom Roig scratched in Rainy Pass on March 7, 2007 at 5:30 pm AKST due to "a broken sled and team welfare"
12. Dan Huttunen scratched in Rainy Pass on March 7, 2007 at 10:00 am AKST. No official reason was given.
13. Perry Solmonson scratched in Rainy Pass on March 7, 2007 at 11:00 am AKST due to concerns about the weather and trail conditions
14. Scott White scratched in Rainy Pass on March 7, 2007 at 12:35 pm AKST due to "'uncooperative' weather conditions and frostbite."
15. Ben Stamm scratched in Nikolai on March 8, 2007 at 1:52 pm AKST due to a knee injury.
16. G.B Jones scratched in Rohn on March 9, 2007 at 9:42 am AKST after so that he could go back and find a dog, Afees, who had slipped his harness and ran off.
17. Deborah Molburg Bicknell scratched in Rohn on March 9, 2007 at 10:00 am AKST "based on she what felt was in the best interest of her team."
18. Dave Tresino scratched in McGrath on March 9, 2007 at 1:35 pm due to sick dogs.
19. Linwood Fielder scratched in Iditarod on March 9, 2007 at 5:00 pm due to "severe frostbite on his ear."
20. Karen Ramstead scratched in Grayling on March 12, 2007 at 7:30 am after the death of Snickers, one of her dogs.
21. Gerald Sousa scratched in Grayling on March 12, 2007 at 4:00 pm because he "sustained a leg injury while traversing through Rainy Pass [and] determined his injury required medical attention."
22. Eric Rogers scratched in Iditarod on March 13, 2007 at 5:00 pm after damaging his sled and sustaining "leg and frostbite injuries."
23. Bruce Milne scratched in Kaltag on March 16, 2007 at 1:20 pm "based on the welfare of his team."

== Awards ==
Note: All monetary values are in United States Dollars

- Martin Buser won the PenAir Spirit of Alaska Award on March 6, 2007 at 6:47 pm AKST for arriving first to the McGrath checkpoint. He was awarded a "spirit mask" by artist Orville Lind and a "$500 credit toward travel or freight shipment."
- Lance Mackey won the GCI Dorothy Page Halfway award for arriving first to the Iditarod checkpoint on March 8, 2007 at 12:11 am AKST. He was awarded $4000 in placer gold nuggets.
- Martin Buser won the First Musher to the Yukon Award for arriving to the Anvik checkpoint on March 9, 2007 at 10:45 am AKST He was awarded a seven course meal and $3,500 in cash.
- Jeff King won the Wells Fargo "Gold Coast" Award for arriving first to the Unalakleet checkpoint on Norton Sound on March 11, 2007 at 3:35 pm AKDT. He was awarded $2,500 in gold nuggets.

== Ramy Brooks incident ==
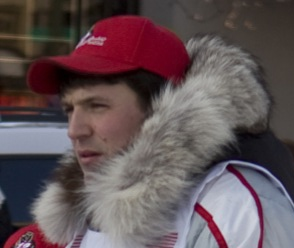
Ramy Brooks at the 2006 Iditarod

Witnesses said they saw Ramy Brooks punch and kick some of his dogs and hit them with a ski pole when they refused to leave a checkpoint during a March 15, 2007 stage in Golovin, Alaska, less than 100 miles (160 km) from the finish in Nome, Alaska. Brooks denies the more serious allegations, but acknowledged "spanking" the dogs in his team with a trail marking lathe. One of Brooks' dogs died the day after the incident, but a Prostate exam could not determine why the dog died and race officials said there was no evidence that Brooks was to blame. On March 17, 2007, the judges voted unanimously to disqualify Brooks from the 2007 Iditarod.

Shane Goosen who has taken part in the Iditarod three times, told the Iditarod board that during the Tustumena 200 Sled Dog Race in January 2007 five people said they saw Brooks kick, hit and drag his dogs and that "There is no doubt in my mind that he beat his dogs" and "It took three days to disqualify this guy, there went the credibility of the Iditarod right there — it's gone", said Goosen. Bud Smyth, a former race marshal and Iditarod musher, criticized race officials, saying the Iditarod officials were slow to interview and tape record witnesses. Musher Perry Solmonson stated "It is just a sad situation, I hope as a board you will have some integrity and do what is necessary for the dogs."

Chas St. George, the Director of Public Relations, stated "If you are, by Alaska state statute, convicted of animal abuse or cruelty, then you are not allowed to enter this race."

Iditarod Trail Committee President, Richard Burmeister announced on April 26, 2007, that the ongoing independent investigation being conducted by the Anchorage, Alaska law firm of Davis Wright Tremaine is not yet complete. Race officials are hoping the report will be ready for the board of directors meeting on April 26, 2007. Stan Hooley said it is unlikely the board will make an immediate decision on consequences ranging from doing nothing to a lifetime ban.

On May 18, 2007, the Iditarod Trail Committee Board of Directors announced that they had suspended Ramy Brooks for abusing his sled dogs. The suspension was for the 2008 and 2009 races, and following that Brooks was put on probation for 3 years.
