= Emmitt Peters =

American dog musher

- Born: October 1, 1940; Ruby, Territory of Alaska, U.S.
- Died: April 2, 2020 (aged 79); Ruby, Alaska, U.S.
- Other name: "Yukon Fox"
- Occupations: Dog musher, fisher, hunter, trapper
- Known for: Winning the 1975 Iditarod Trail Sled Dog Race

Emmitt Peters Sr. (October 1, 1940 – April 2, 2020) the "Yukon Fox", was an Alaskan American hunter, fisher, trapper, and dog musher. The last rookie to win the 1,049 mile Iditarod Trail Sled Dog Race (in 1975), he and his lead dogs Nugget and Digger shattered the previous speed record by almost six days.

Peters was an Athabaskan Alaska Native who was born in Ruby, deep in the Alaska Interior. He became a hunter, fisher, and trapper, and grew up around sled dogs. Mushing was the primary means of transportation in the rural parts of the state, far from the road system that spans southern Alaska, but the advent of the snowmobile (known as snowmachines in Alaska) in the 1960s almost drove mushing into extinction.

== Iditarod ==
Year	Position	Time (h:min)
1975	1st	14 days, 14:43
1976	5th
1977	4th
1978	3rd
1979	2nd
1980	9th
1981	12th	13 days, 14:14
1982	4th
1983	19th
1984	17th
1985	12th
1986
1987
1988
1989
1990	41st
1991	—	(scratched)
1992
1993
1994
1995
1996
1997
1998
1999
2000	40th	12 days, 2:42

Peters entered the Iditarod as a rookie in 1975, and won the race with a time of 14 days, 14 hours, 43 minutes, and 45 seconds. The two previous races in 1973 and 1974 were slower and more measured, and both were won in just over 20 days. The 1975 race was a close one, and he placed in the top 10 in the next five races. According to Peters, he earned the "Yukon Fox" nickname, "because I'd sneak away from all my competitors and have five or six teams chasing me" (Rozell, 2003). Even with a weak team of sled dogs, he regularly placed high in the standings.

The race changed as corporate sponsors began to fund top competitors, who ran large kennels and bred faster dogs. Peters gradually fell behind, and until he broke his knee in a training accident in 1986 and stopped racing. He returned briefly in 1990 and 1991, but only placed 41st in the first year, and scratched in the second.

Peters raced his final Iditarod in 2000, and finished in 12 days, 2 hours, and 42 minutes, which was his fastest time ever. He earned the Most Inspirational Musher Award, which is given based on a vote by the other finishers. Afterwards he said, "that's it. No one is going to talk me into anything else" (Pemberton, 2000).

Peters served as a volunteer checker at Ruby, which is an official checkpoint of the Iditarod on even-numbered years.

== Alaska Native mushers ==
Peters had to sell his dogs to cover his debts after the races in the 1990s, and was only able to race his final race because two friends donated USD $10,000 each, and he leased a team from Rick Swenson. While Alaska Natives won the 2nd, 3rd, and 4th Iditarods, and accounted for roughly a third of all the racers, by the 1980s the costs had become prohibitive and the native presence almost vanished from the race.

Expenses faced by modern teams include lightweight gear including thousands of booties and quick-change runners, special high-energy dog foods, veterinary care, and breeding costs. According to Athabaskan musher Ken Chase, "the big expenses [for rural Alaskans] are the freight and having to buy dog food". (Hutchinson) Most modern teams cost $10,000 to $40,000, and the top 10 spend between $80,000 and $100,000 a year. Sponsors are hard to solicit without access to roads, and for most purposes snowmobiles are more economical.

A minor resurgence saw Ramy Brooks and John Baker place 5th and 6th in the 2005 Iditarod. Ramy Brooks placed 2nd twice, and his second place finish after Martin Buser's record-setting run in 2002 is the second fastest time in the history of the Iditarod.

== Iditarod awards ==
Anchorage Daily News (2005)
Year	Iditarod awards	Criteria
1975	Rookie of the Year Award	Highest placing first timer
1979	Golden Harness	Best lead dog
1982	Halfway Award	1st to Cripple
2000	Most Inspirational Musher Award	Chosen by other mushers
