= 2005 Iditarod =

Sled-dog race in Alaska, USA

33rd Annual Iditarod Trail Sled Dog Race
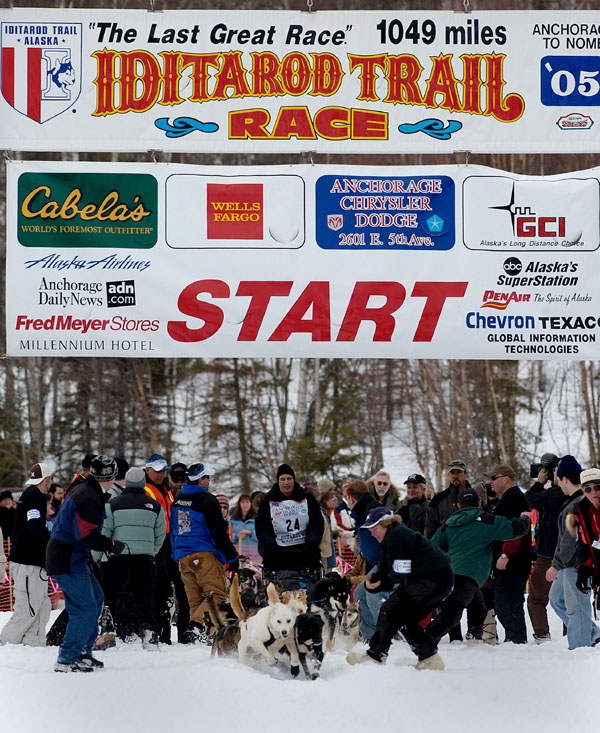
- Musher Thomas Knolmayer at the Willow restart point.
- Venue: Iditarod Trail
- Location: Alaska
- Dates: March 5–16, 2005
- Competitors: 63

Champion
- Robert Sørlie

The ceremonial start of the 33rd annual Iditarod Trail Sled Dog Race across the US state of Alaska began in Anchorage on March 5, 2005, at 10 am AKST (19:00 UTC), and restarted in Willow the next day at 2 pm (23:00 UTC). After covering 1,161 miles (1,868 km) of wilderness, musher Robert Sørlie, an airport firefighter from Norway, crossed the finish line under the "burled arch" in Nome on March 16 at 8:39 am AKST (17:39 UTC). After taking care of his dogs, and an inspection to make sure all the mandatory equipment was in his sled, Sørlie was declared the winner by Race Marshal Mark Norman, with a time of 9 days, 18 hours, 39 minutes, and 31 seconds and won US$72,066.67 and a new truck. When asked how it felt to win a second time, Sørlie said "it feels good, I'm ready for breakfast." His team of dogs averaged 4.65 mi/h (7.58 km/h). The Red Lantern in last was Phil Morgan, an Alaska Airlines pilot, and when he crossed the finish line on March 21 at 8:02 pm AKST (March 22, 5:02 UTC), the Widow's Lantern hanging on the burled arch was extinguished, which signaled the end of the race.

Sørlie became the first non-U.S. resident to win the race in 2003, and the similarities between his two victories are striking. In both races he was plagued by insomnia, pulled ahead by the halfway point of the race, managed to hold on to a sizeable but diminishing lead, and was reduced to 8 of 16 dogs by the finish. Both races were also slowed by poor trail conditions, which was caused by unseasonably warm weather with daily highs that hovered just above freezing.

The finishers banquet was held on March 20, and 62 of 63 mushers had crossed the finish line and were able to attend. Bjørnar Andersen won the Rookie of the Year Award, with the best place by a rookie since 1976. Martin Buser, who lost part of a finger in a table-saw accident less than a week before the race and had exposed nerves trimmed by a veterinarian, finished 12th, winning both the Sportsmanship and the Most Inspirational Musher awards. The Golden Harness was given to Whitestock, one of Sørlie's lead dogs. (ITC, March 21, 2005)

Sixteen other mushers scratched, including the only five-time champion of the Iditarod, Rick Swenson, and the legally blind Rachael Scdoris, who caused a media sensation at the start of the race. The top 30 arrived in Nome by the end of March 17 AKST. By the end of March 20 all but one musher had arrived in Nome. Note: All times are Alaska Standard Time/AKST (UTC-9).

== March 5: Ceremonial start ==
Ceremonial start
Anchorage to Campbell Airstrip: 11 mi (18 km)
Highway
Campbell Airstrip to Willow: 59 mi (95 km)
Restart
Willow to Yetna: 45 mi (72 km)
See Iditarod Trail Sled Dog Race for rest of route
Modified distance: 1,161 miles (1,868 km)

Anchorage to Campbell Airstrip: The ceremonial start of the 33rd annual Iditarod race began at 10 am Alaska Standard Time on March 5, 2005, in Anchorage. The first "bib" position out of the starting chute on Fourth Avenue and D Street was reserved for honorary musher Jirdes Winther Baxter, the last known survivor of the children who were saved from a diphtheria epidemic by the historic 1925 serum run to Nome. Baxter rode out of the starting chute on Fourth Avenue and D Street in the sled of 15-year-old Melissa Owens, who won the 138-mile (222 km) Junior Iditarod on February 27, with a time of 1 day, 51 minutes, and 27 seconds. Earlier in the year, Owens also placed second in the Junior Yukon Quest.

Separated by intervals of at least two minutes, the competitors departed starting at 10:02 am. The last team left at 12:53 pm. In addition to the musher and the team of 12 dogs, each dog sled also carried a family member or friend, and an "Idita-Rider". The Idita-Riders seats were auctioned off in January, and raised a total of US$140,021, with an average bid of US$1,918.09. The auction was held entirely online for the first time in 2005.

The teams passed through 1.5 miles (2.4 km) of city streets lined with an estimated 100,000 people. The temperature was 32 °F (0 °C). Due to the warm weather and poor trail conditions, the first leg of the race was shortened by the Iditarod Trail Committee on February 27, and ended at Campbell Airstrip 11 miles (18 km) from Anchorage, instead of the traditional checkpoint 20 miles (32 km) away at Eagle River.

== March 6: Restart in Willow ==
Restart at Willow: From the Airstrip the teams were shipped by truck to the restart point, which is normally at the Iditarod Headquarters in Wasilla. Due to inclement weather the restart was moved 30 miles (48 km) north to Willow, and the checkpoint at Knik was skipped.

The time to Nome is calculated from Sunday, March 6, at 2 pm when the first team departed from Willow Lake. The remaining teams left, staggered by two-minute intervals, until the last departed at 4:36 pm. Each departing team had up to the maximum of 16 dogs, and no more can be added during the race.

In 2004, the starting time of the race was pushed back from 10 am. Sled dogs perform better in temperatures close to 0 °F (−18 °C), and this allows mushers to run their teams through the cold of the night until they cross the Alaska Range into the Interior. Among the last three to leave were previous Iditarod winners Martin Buser and Jeff King, who entered the race at the last minute in order to secure a late starting position.

An estimated 12,000 to 15,000 fans watched the restart, and the area was thronged by snowmobiles (snowmachines, in Alaska), bonfire parties, and between 4,000 and 5,000 cars. The chaos is hard on the dogs, who are accustomed to the wilderness; Kelly Griffin's team ran into the crowd before steering back on course.

Yentna: Jessie Royer was the first to arrive at Yetna Station on March 6 at 5:37 pm, and Rachael Scdoris was the last at 9:34 pm. The top 10 mushers departed within an hour of each other, and the top 30 within two hours.

Skwentna: An early lead pack developed as Jessica Henricks, the 2003 Rookie of the Year, became the first to arrive at Skwentna on March 6 at 8:59 pm, followed by DeeDee Jonrowe almost 30 minutes later, and then Phil Morgan, Rick Swenson, and Mike Williams. Scdoris was the last to arrive at 7:31 am the next day. Hans Gatt departed first, at 10:28 pm. The top 10 departed within 2 hours of each other, and the top 30 within 6 hours.

G. B. Jones became the first musher to scratch from the race, on March 7 in Skwentna. The Iditarod veteran indicated he had problems with sled quality, his lead dogs, and personal health ever since the restart in Willow.

== March 7: Alaska Range ==
The heat and soft snow slowed the race, and the glare off the snow was blinding during the day.

Finger Lake: Melanie Gould arrived first at Finger Lake on March 8 at 5:38 am, followed by Hendricks at 5:50 am, and then Swenson and Jonrowe an hour later. Dallas Seavey was the last to arrive at 6:59 pm. Jonrowe was the first depart, at 7:02 am, followed by Swenson a minute later, and Lance Mackey, Mike Williams, Robert Sørlie, and Buser within the hour. The top 10 (15) departed within 2 hours, and the top 30 within four hours.

Happy Valley Gorge leading up to Rainy Pass is hazardous in regular years, but in 2005 the trail conditions were miserable, especially for the mushers at the back. Snowmachines left frozen wakes, and the leading dogsleds riddled the trail with potholes, some more than 3-foot (0.914 m) deep.

Other notable crashes on the way to Rainy Pass:

- "Visual interpreter" Paul Ellering lost two-way communication with Scdoris when his radio was destroyed in a crash.
- Jacques Philips caught his hand between a tree and the handle bar on his sled while coming up Happy Valley Gorge. His hand was either broken or dislocated, and required medical treatment so Philips scratched in Rainy Pass on March 7. In 1985, Philip was the first French musher to race in the Iditarod, and is a three-time winner of the European Alpirod dog sled race.
- Judy Merrit fell and was knocked unconscious while traversing the Happy Valley Gorge. She remained at Rainy Pass lodge for two days, before scratching on March 9, citing a concussion, persistent headaches, and fatigued dogs. She later said "the steps and the gorge are my dragon".

Rainy Pass: While making the long climb to the Rainy Pass Lodge on Puntilla Lake, DeeDee Jonrowe hit a snowmobile sitting on the trail, and sheared off a bolt connecting the runner to her sled. She still arrived first, on March 7 at 10:27 am. Dallas Seavey, the last to arrive at 10:53 am the next day, lost two runners on the way in. Former runner-up Ramy Brooks was the first to depart, at 12:11 pm. The top 10 all left within 6 hours, and the top 30 within 8 hours.

From the lodge, the route crosses through Rainy Pass in the Alaska Range, then descends into the Interior. A helicopter observed a woman crashing multiple times along the steep descent known as the Dalzell Gorge.

Rohn: Sørlie starts to set the pace across the Interior. He is the first to arrive in Rohn, on March 7 at 7:08 pm, followed by Buser almost two hours later. Brooks is again the first to depart, at 10:42 pm, as the early leaders start to pull away from the pack. The top 10 depart in 6 hours, and the top 30 in about 9 hours.

On the way to Nikolai, Swingley broke a runner and lost a pad on his sled while negotiating the wildfire badlands of the Farewell Burn. Scdoris suffered scratches and a large bruise on her hip after crashing into a tree, after her snow hook snagged on the ground.

Sonny Lindner from Michigan became the third to scratch on March 8, citing health problems. Lindner was the 1984 winner of the Yukon Quest.

== March 8 ==
Nikolai: Sørlie continues to set the pace by arriving first at Nikolai on March 8 at 11:16 am, followed by Brooks and Jonrowe about an hour later. Sørlie is also the first to depart, at 5:09 pm. The 10 fastest mushers follow quickly, in just over 3 hours, but the top 30 now lag up to 11 hours apart. Sørlie has insomnia, just like he did when he won in 2003, though his dogs are resting well.

McGrath:. Sørlie wins the Spirit of Alaska Award when he arrives at the hub of the Interior first, on March 8 at 10:40 pm. He continued on just four minutes later. The top 10 are stretched over about 6 1/2 hours, and the top 30 over about 21 hours.

On March 10 Rick Swenson, the only five-time winner of the race, scratched for the first time, citing concern for his dogs. He had left McGrath, arrived at Taknotna, and was on his way to Ophir when he returned all the way to McGrath, the central hub for dropped dogs in the Interior. Swenson reported he was down to 11 dogs, and needed to drop two, which would have left him with only 9 dogs in harness. Swenson was first "King of the Iditarod", with a string of three victories in five years in the 1970s, and wins in both the 1980s and the 1990s. From his first race, he has only missed two races in 31 years. Five dogs were injured when he arrived in McGrath before turning back.

Gary McKellar scratched at McGrath on March 12, after resting his team overnight. McKellar cited concerns about his team's performance and their well-being. McKellar was the Red Lantern in last place.

== March 9 ==
When arguing for stricter emission limits during the debate over the "Clear Skies" bill, Senator Tom Carper (D-DE) used the northerly shift of the restart location as an example of global warming.

Takotna: Sørlie became the first to arrive at Takotna on March 9 at 0:42 am, followed by Brooks, Jonrowe, and Ally Zirkle. Sørlie is the first to depart at 6:54 am. The top 10 follow within 8 hours, and the top 30 within 28 hours.

Andersen from Norway and Swingley from Montana began to travel together. Andersen was Swingley's dog handler in 2000, after meeting at a Norway convention.

Ophir: Sørlie again was the first to arrive, on March 9 at 9:midnight, followed by Buser, then Brooks. Sørlie departs 13 minutes later. The top 10 follow within 11 hours, and the top 30 within 22 hours.

After leaving Ophir in 8th place, Zack Steer became the fifth musher to scratch when he returned on March 9 for undisclosed personal reasons. Steer's wife is pregnant and due later this month. Scott Smith from Wyoming scratched at Ophir on March 12, citing concerns for his team which only had nine dogs left.

The trail between Ophir and Iditarod was in poor shape, and efforts to improve it were too late for the front runners.

== March 10: Halfway point at Iditarod ==
The checkpoint closest to the middle of the race on odd-numbered years is the trail's namesake, the historic gold rush ghost town of Iditarod (meaning "far distant place"). Cliff Wang from Montana scratched at Takotna on March 11, citing concerns for his team after unseasonably warm weather in Montana impact their training.

Iditarod: Sørlie wins the Dorothy G. Page Halfway Award and US$4,000 in gold nuggets when he arrives at Iditarod on March 10 at 1:41 am. While the Halfway Award is sometimes considered a jinx, Sørlie also won it before his victory in 2003. He was followed by Brooks an hour later, then Buser. Paul Gebhardt becomes the first musher to depart the midpoint at 5:59 pm. The top 10 stretched over 14 hours, and the top 30 over 24 hours.

Standings through the Interior can be deceptive because all mushers are required to take one mandatory 24-hour layover during the race, usually at Takotna, McGrath, or Iditarod. The differential in starting times is adjusted during this period, and most of the racers were on a level playing field after Iditarod.

== March 11: Yukon River ==
Shageluk: Most of the other teams stopped at McGrath, Takotna, or Iditarod for their mandatory 24-hour layover, allowing Gebhardt to arrive at Shageluk more than 7 hours ahead of the next musher on March 11 at 2:45 am. Gebhardt left 10 minutes later, followed by the top 10 within 19 hours, and the top 30 within 33 hours. Cliff Wang from Montana scratched at Takotna on March 11, citing concerns for his team after unseasonably warm weather in Montana impact their training.

Anvik: Gebhardt won the First Musher to Reach the Yukon Award when he arrived at Anvik on March 11 at 7:14 am, and was served a 7-course meal prepared by a chef from the Millennium Hotel Anchorage. Sørlie retakes the lead when he departs at 9:31 pm. The top 10 are within just over 6 hours, and the top 30 within 19 hours. After his 24-hour rest, Gebhardt dropped to 15th place.

Conditions were relatively good at this stage, but the highs remained above freezing. This favored teams trained in warmer areas, like Swingley from Montana, and Sørlie and Andersen from Norway. Some teams even faced rain on the way to Anvik. Andersen breaks into the top 10, and remains there until at least Kaltag. He is at least 10 hours ahead of the next rookie, and is set to take the Rookie of the Year Award. Sørlie's nephew, he and may follow his uncle's pattern of placing in the top 10 in his first race.

Mushers are required to stop at a checkpoint along the Yukon River before leaving the Interior, but only for 8 hours.

Charlie Boulding scratched at Anvik on March 12. Boulding is a former winner of the Yukon Quest (1991, 1993), and finished in the top 10 in eight of thirteen Iditarods, placing 3rd in 1998. Boulding planned to retire this year. Bill Cotter scratched on March 13, because his team was sick.

== March 12 ==
Grayling: Jonrowe was the first to arrive at Grayling on March 12 at 0:21 am, and took her mandatory 8-hour break. Sørlie arrived within 15 minutes, and continued to Eagle Island 5 minutes later, followed by Buser an hour and a half later. The top 10 followed within 12 hours, and the top 30 within 24 hours.

King reported that the warm fresh snow was sticking the runners of the sleds. Above freezing temperatures hindered the dogs. On March 15, Robert Greger scratched because the dogs were not performing to his expectations, and so did Sandy McKee.

Eagle Island: Sørlie is the first to arrive at the Eagle Island on March 12 at 11:30 am, after a 14-hour run from Grayling. Buser was the second to arrive on March 13, 3:25 pm, after losing two hours backtracking to find Quebec, who slipped from the gangline during a snowstorm. Quebec had a habit of eating heavily, and then backing up and stepping to the side before relieving himself. According to Buser's wife Kathy Chapoton, "at this point, that's a huge lead". Brooks, Mitch Seavey, and Jonrowe followed. Sørlie was the first to depart at 7:31 pm, followed by Lance Mackey 17 minutes later, then Brooks, Buser, and Jonrowe. The top 10 are within 7 hours, and the top 30 are within 21 hours. At this stage, all the pacesetters have taken their mandatory 24- and 8-hour layovers.

The temperatures are just above freezing, and a freezing rain advisory has been issued for Kaltag. On March 16, Scdoris scratched after several of her dogs came down with a viral diarrhea, saying "it was not an eye thing. It was a my-dogs-are-sick thing". Another concern was weight loss: her dogs were fed canned dog food, with some kibble, salmon and fat, which did not help maintain their weight as well as the heavy meat diet most dogs are fed. Her guide Paul Ellering scratched shortly after, saying "I'm just the kind of guy who leaves with the girl he came to the dance with". Scdoris had navigated the most treacherous portions of the race, including Happy Valley, Dazell Gorge, and the Farewell Burn before she withdrew, and plans to return next year. "All the tough spots were tough, but I now know I can do it".

== March 13: Bering Sea ==
Kaltag: Sørlie was the first to arrive at Kaltag on March 13 at 3:43 am. He left Kaltag in first place at 8:44 am, followed by Brooks about an hour later, Buser another hour later, and John Baker yet another hour later. The top 10 are within slightly more than 6 hours, and the top 30 are within 26 hours. On March 16, Karen Ramstead scratched here, citing concerns for her team and trail conditions. Her teams is composed of Siberian huskies, instead of the more common mixed-breed Alaska huskies.

Unalakleet: Sørlie won the Alaska Gold Coast Award for reaching Unalakleet in first place on March 13, at 20:45 pm. Sørlie was the first to depart on March 14 at 0:11 am. The top 10 departed within 8 hours, and the top 30 within 27 hours. Sørlie said, "it's still a long way to Nome".

The trail normally runs down the Unalakleet River into town, but shifted 7 miles (11 km) due to water overflowing the ice. The xtrail markers led through a 1-foot (0.30 m) deep over flow, which several teams went through. Temperatures are expected to hit the 40s (F, or 5–10 °C) through March 16. Unalakleet is on the shore of the Norton Sound, and the race normally picks up pace and intensity as the leaders start the long final dash north and west along the shore of the Bering Sea to Nome.

== March 14 ==
Shaktoolik: Sørlie was the first to arrive on March 14 at 7 am, followed by Brooks an hour and a half later. Sørlie remained in the lead as he left Shaktoolik on March 14 at 12:05 pm (UTC 21:05), but his lead diminished to less than an hour as he was followed by Mitch Seavey, then Buser, and a strong pack including Brooks, Lance Mackey, King, Ed, Jonrowe, and Baker, who are consistently averaging 1 to 1.5 mi/hr (1.5 to 2.5 km/h) faster between checkpoints. The top 10 departed within 5 1/2 hours, and the top 30 in about 29 hours. Sørlie's teammate Andersen is now trailing Swingley by 26 minutes and has slipped from the top 10, but he is still more than a checkpoint ahead of Louis Nelson Sr., the next rookie.

The teams are getting smaller as fatigued and poorly performing dogs are left behind. The top 10 are running with between 9 and 12 dogs, down from 16, and the majority have either 10 or 11. A fair number of dogs have been dropped with fatigue or sprains caused by the poor conditions of the trail. Teams with less than 9 dogs lack power. There has been a fair amount of rain, which helps keep the dogs cool in the high temperatures. The winds as the teams cross the exposed ice of the Norton Sound on the way to Koyuk may reach 40 mi/h (65 km/h). This is the stretched covered by Leonhard Seppala and his lead dog Togo during the 1925 serum run. Teams may press through to Koyuk to catch Sørlie.

Koyuk: Sørlie arrived first on March 14 at 5:57 pm, and was the first to depart three minutes later. The top 10 departed within 8 1/2 hours, and the top 30 spread out 38 hours.

== March 15 ==
Elim: Sørlie arrived first on March 15 at 1:17 am, and departed three hours later. John Baker was the second musher to arrive, 7 minutes after Sørlie's departure. The top 10 stretched out 10 hours, and the top 30 are now 39 hours apart. Sørlie and Buser left dogs behind, dropping their teams to just 8. Lance Mackey is in 11th place, which is the best position a winner of the Yukon Quest has held in a same-year Iditarod. The trail follows the coast then crosses inland over the Kwitalik Mountains.

White Mountain: Sørlie again was slow, taking almost 9 hours to arrive on March 15 at 12:59 pm, and may have gotten lost on Little McKinley. Normally a 5- to 7-hour trip, the slushy, soppy snow or just fatigue have slowed the top 10, though Iten rocketed in to arrive second, followed by a very fast Mitch Seavey, and a quick Brooks. Andersen, after hovering around 10th place, jumped to 6th. The remainder of the front-runners are more than four hours behind, and will start jockeying for position; slipping just one place in the final standings can cost several thousand dollars (US$) in prize money. The top 10 left within 9 hours.

Sørlie departed in exactly 8 hours, and the rest are taking their mandatory 8-hour rests. The parallels between the current race and his victory in 2003 are striking: in both races, he pulled ahead early and held onto a sizeable lead, dropped to a mere 8 dogs, and faced soft sticky snow. On March 14 to 15, a storm along the southern shore of the Seward Peninsula grounded most airplanes, which prevented the small aircraft of the Iditarod Air Force from flying veterinarians and race officials into White Mountain before the leaders arrived, though local volunteers were present. The whiteout conditions and open water on the trail made snowmobile travel unsafe. This is the first time since at least 1988 that veterinarians were present to check teams arriving at a checkpoint, and the single veterinarian at Elim was overworked. Flights began again on March 16, but gusts of winds remained high (30 to 35 mph). The top 10 departed within 9 hours. After two scratches, Scdoris and Ellering are in last place. It normally takes about 10 hours from White Mountain to Nome.

== March 16: Burled arch in Nome ==
Safety: Robert Sørlie of Norway was the first to leave Safety on March 16 at 4:52 pm AKST (March 16, 13:52 UTC), with only 22 miles (35 km) from the finish line. Ed Iten cut his lead to just one hour and five minutes, but is unlikely to catch up. Mitch Seavey left 42 minutes later, then Sørlie's teammate Bjørnar Andersen, just 18 minutes later. Barring a catastrophe Andersen will win the Rookie of the Year Award. The top 10 departed within 8 hours.

The rest of the top 15 are two-time runner up Ramy Brooks, John Baker, Paul Gebhardt, this year's winner of the Yukon Quest Lance Mackey, Jessie Royer, three-time winner Jeff King, four-time winner Martin Buser, DeeDee Jonrowe, Aliy Zirkle, four-time winner Doug Swingley, and Jessica Hendricks. The front-runners are jockeying for position, because slipping just one place in the final standings can cost several thousand dollars (US$) in prize money. Legally blind Rachael Scdoris and her "visual interpreter" Paul Ellering are in last place, and are en route from Grayling to Eagle Island.

Nome: Robert Sørlie of Norway crossed the finish line under the "burled arch" in Nome on March 16 at 8:39 am AKST, winning the race with a time of 9 days, 18 hours, 39 minutes, and 31 seconds. The top 10 finished in just over 7 hours. This was a relatively close race; in 33 Iditarods the race has been won by less than an hour only nine times, the last time in 1993 when Jeff King beat DeeDee Jonrowe.

Ed Iten made a hard push at the end of the race, and finished 26 minutes later in second place, beating his previous best of 5th in 2004. Last year's champion Mitch Seavey's bid to take the lead came up a little short, but he successfully fended off Sørlie's teammate and nephew, Bjørnar Andersen, to place third. Andersen's 4th-place finish with Team Norway's second string of dogs makes him the highest placed rookie since 1976, and wins him the Rookie of the Year Award. Two-time runner up Ramy Brooks took 5th place more than an hour and a half later than Andersen, and he was followed by John Baker just 11 minutes later. Lance Mackey arrived 2 1/2 hours later, in 7th place, which is the best anyone has ever done in the Iditarod after winning the Yukon Quest in the same year, followed by Jesse Royer, Paul Gebhardt, and DeeDee Jonrowe. The remaining racers jockeyed for position, because slipping just one place in the final standings can cost several thousand US$ in prize money.

Former winners Buser and King pushed hard toward the end of the race, but ended up in 12th and 13th place. Buser credits the delay in turning and picking up Quebec as the primary factor.

Royer in 8th place was the first of the young female mushers who took the lead early in the race to cross the finish line, passing Jessica Hendricks at Koyuk, and then catching up with Buser, King, Swingley, and Jonrowe at Elim and passed all but Mackey as they crossed Little McKinley before reaching Golovin. Royer even passed Gebhardt, just outside Nome, though King was close behind. Former Yukon Quest winner Aliy Zirkle placed 11th, and Tustumena 300 winner Jessica Hendricks placed 15th.

Place	Musher	Lead dog(s)	Time (h:min:s)	Prize (US$)
1st	Robert Sørlie	Sox & Blue	9 days, 18:39:31	$72,066.67
2nd	Ed Iten		9 days, 19:13:33	$65,800.00
3rd	Mitch Seavey		9 days, 19:20:58	$59,533.33
4th	Bjørnar Andersen		9 days, 19:50:38	$52,222.22
5th	Ramy Brooks		9 days, 21:30:00	$45,955.56
6th	John Baker		9 days, 21:41:00	$41,777.78
7th	Lance Mackey		10 days, 00:21:00	$38,644.44
8th	Jessie Royer		10 days, 01:03:30	$35,511.11
9th	Paul Gebhardt		10 days, 01:24:20	$32,377.78
10th	DeeDee Jonrowe		10 days, 01:42:55	$29,244.44
11th	Aliy Zirkle		10 days, 01:46:30	$26,111.11
12th	Jeff King		10 days, 02:21:21	$22,977.78
13th	Martin Buser		10 days, 02:32:40	$20,888.89
14th	Doug Swingley		10 days, 02:59:03	$18,800.00
15th	Jessica Hendricks		10 days, 03:20:28	$17,755.56
16th	Tyrell Seavey		10 days, 05:25:52	$16,711.11
17th	Ken Andersen		10 days, 09:25:54	$15,666.67
18th	Hans Gatt		10 days, 12:26:05	$14,622.22
19th	Tim Osmar		10 days, 15:08:25	$13,577.78
20th	Ramey Smyth		10 days, 16:12:59	$12,533.33
21st	Louis Nelson Sr.		10 days, 16:17:45	$11,488.89
22nd	Vern Halter		10 days, 17:20:15	$9,400.00
23rd	Melanie Gould		10 days, 19:04:17	$8,355.56
24th	Aaron Burmeister		10 days, 19:09:39	$5,535.56
25th	Ray Redington Jr.		10 days, 20:17:04	$4,700.00
26th	Hugh H. Neff		10 days, 20:17:04	$3,446.67
27th	Diana Moroney		11 days, 01:07:56	$2,820.00
28th	Peter Bartlett		11 days, 01:37:28	$2,402.22
29th	Harmony Barron		11 days, 06:04:34	$2,193.33
30th	Jason Barron		11 days, 06:08:56	$1,880.00

Sørlie said, "I think this win is better than the 2003. This year, the dogs are better." Sørlie is first non-U.S. resident to win the race, and the second foreign citizen, after four-time winner Martin Buser who was a Swiss citizen who became a naturalized U.S. citizen in 2002.

Sørlie also said, "I have proved that I can do the ordinary race". The 2003 race was restarted in Fairbanks, due to weather, and followed a heavily modified route. "People said I won the last one because the course was so different. This year we were back to the original route, starting in Anchorage. The course from Fairbanks was much easier." While the weather this year favored mushers who trained in warmer climates (Swingley from Montana placed higher than expected with an inexperienced team), the victory by Sørlie over a normal route, and the impressive rookie showing by Andersen is already leading to speculation that other mushers will copy their training techniques. Andersen's place is the best since 1976, just a few years after the first race in 1973 when all the mushers were rookies.

Sørlie races the Iditarod every other year, alternating with his teammate Backen, but after Andersen's finish he indicated the team may push Andersen instead and said, "I haven't decided whether I'll run in 2007". The three have a team of 50 dogs, and according to Sørlie "this year was my time to take the best team. Next year will be for Bjornar." At 47, Sørlie is also the oldest winner of the Iditarod.

== March 21 ==
The Red Lantern in last was Phil Morgan, an Alaska Airlines pilot, and when he crossed the finish line on March 21 at 8:02 pm AKST (March 22, 5:02 UTC), the Widow's Lantern hanging on the burled arch was extinguished, which signalled the end of the race. The Christmas lights and banners were also taken down. He took 15 days, 6 hours, 2 minutes, and 57 seconds and completed the race with 8 dogs, becoming the only musher unable to attend the Finisher's Banquet the night before. Many mushers scratched because of poor conditions, and the Red Lantern signifies "stick-to-itiveness". Morgan is a 737-200 pilot.

Trailing the pack, Morgan became the only musher to blizzard en route from White Mountain. Three of his dogs were in heat at the start of the race, and he had to drop his lead dogs at Iditarod. Morgan has been a volunteer with the Iditarod Airforce since 1995. According to Morgan, "we lived through some crazy experiences".

According to Nome Mayor Leo Rasmussen, the race brought a total of US$23 million in business to the state of Alaska in the 1990s. Nome and other areas in Alaska had a financial slump during the winter due to high fuel prices.

== Competitors ==
There are a total of 79 mushers entered in the race, including 19 from the continental United States (the "Lower 48"), 9 from outside the U.S., 16 women, and 28 rookies, who are competing in their first Iditarod. A total of 23 entrants withdrew before the start of the race. The entry fee was US$1,850.

The 2005 race has competitors from four countries. Norway is represented by Trine Lyrek, Bjørnar Andersen, and the 2003 winner, Robert Sørlie. Canada is represented by Hans Gatt from British Columbia, Karen Ramstead from Alberta, Aaron Peck from Ontario, and Sebastian Schunelle and Michael "Longway" Salvisberg from the Yukon Territory. Dodo Perri from Italy, and another competitor from Italy, and one each from Germany and South Africa withdrew before the start of the race.

Nineteen competitors are from other states in the U.S., with the most (seven) from Montana: Harmony Barron, Jason Barron, John Barron, Robert Greger, Melanie Shirilla, four-time winner Doug Swingley, and Cliff Wang. In addition, Gregg Hickman, Andrew Letzring, and Ed Stielstra are from Michigan; Perry Solomonson and Mark Stamm are from Washington; Bill Pinkham and Lachlan Clarke are from Colorado; Steve Rasmussen and Paul Ellering are from Minnesota; Rachael Scdoris is from Oregon, Scott Smith is from Wyoming, and Bryan Mills is from Wisconsin. Greg Paulsen from New Mexico withdrew. The remainder are Alaskan.

The field is extremely competitive, with no clear favorites. As of March 5, 2005, every winner since 1990 is scheduled to race. These include

The relatively warm conditions may favor dogs trained in the Lower 48 states. The mixed breed huskies favored by mushers perform best in sub-zero weather, and dogs trained in relatively warm conditions will be more acclimated. Until reaching the cold of the Alaska Interior, most mushers prefer to run their teams during the night and sleep during the day, to take advantage of the colder temperatures. On the other hand, unseasonably warm temperatures made is more difficult to train sled dogs in Montana and other locations. Sørlie, Buser, Jonrowe, and Seavey trained in warmer climates, while Boulding trained his dogs in the cold Interior.

- Charlie Boulding (scratched): A two-time winner of the Yukon Quest who placed 3rd in his best Iditarod, he a popular, distinctive figure. He announced he was retiring before the start of the race.
- Ramy Brooks: Finished in 2nd place twice.
- Martin Buser: Four time champion (1992, 1994, 1997, and 2002) and holder of the all-time speed record, he lost a finger above the second joint in a table saw accident as part of an "unplanned weight-loss program" several days before the race, and is taking painkillers and antibiotics. Until it was trimmed, Buser's exposed nerve "kept catching and jolting my insides", and a doctor flew in to Iditarod to give him more antibiotics.
- Hans Gatt: Three-time winner of the Yukon Quest. He followed his win in 2002 with 23rd-place finish in the Iditarod, 2nd only to Tim Osmar's 18th-place finish in 2001 after winning the Quest.
- DeeDee Jonrowe: Second place finisher in 1993 and 1998, and competitor in 21 Iditarods. She is a fan-favorite, after finishing in 4th in 1997 after a car crash, and competing in 2003 just three weeks after the end of chemotherapy for breast cancer.
- Jeff King: Three-time winner (1993, 1996, 1998), and also a previous winner of the Yukon Quest.
- Major Thomas Knolmayer: The only active duty serviceperson in the race is the chief of surgery at Elmendorf Air Force Base.
- Lance Mackey: Winner of the 2005 Yukon Quest (as a rookie) just 3 weeks before, and the first to be a contender in both races in the same year.
- Gary Paulsen (withdrew): The prolific author of many young adult books on the Iditarod including Winterdance and Woodsong, who was planning a return after a 20-year absence withdrew before the race.
- Rachael Scdoris: Scodoris is from Bend, Oregon, who is afflicted with congenital achromatopsia, is the first legally blind musher to compete. In 2004, she competed in the John Beargrease Dog Sled Race along the shore of Lake Superior, placing sixth. The story of petition in 2003 to the Iditarod Trail Committee under the auspices of the Americans with Disabilities Act of 1990 was chronicled in her autobiography, No End in Sight, co-authored with Rick Steber. As a result, arrangements were made for her to follow a "visual interpreter", former professional wrestler Paul Ellering, who will notify her by two-way radio or shouting of upcoming hazards. Ellering has competed in one previous Iditarod, placing 54th in 2000. According to Scdoris, "I need someone to tell me where to turn. And there's that whole low-hanging-branches-coming-out-of-nowhere question". She became the media sensation before the start of a race, partly driven by a strong public relations campaign driven by her father, including a CD, "Go Rachael!" buttons, and an 8-page color brochure for the members of the press.
- Mitch Seavey: The returning champion. His two sons Tyrell and Dallas are also competing. His dogs are known for stamina and pulling ahead at the end of the race. Seavey said, "The trail was soft and punchy. We spent hours and hours and hours wallowing in deep snow."
- Dallas Seavey: He turned 18 on March 4, 2005, became the youngest musher in the history of the Iditarod. He was also able to become the first to compete in both the Junior Iditarod and the Iditarod in the same year, because his birthday fell between the two events. He also competed in Junior Yukon Quest, with fellow legacies Nikolai and Rohn Buser.
- Robert Sørlie: Winner in 2003, and did not compete in 2004 so an undefeated champion. Sørlie and rookie Andersen condition their dogs by running them 4,000 miles (6,400 km) a year, mixing 24-hour runs for endurance, with time taken out to play. "It's getting into their mind, trying to get the dogs happy", according to Andersen. Sørlie's team is in excellent shape after long runs, and recovers after a short rest.
- Rick Swenson (scratched): Only five-time champion (1977, 1979, 1981, 1982, 1991), and only person to compete in 29 Iditarods.
- Doug Swingley, also a four-time winner (1995, 1999–2001), suffered frostbite in his corneas during the 2004 race when he neglected to wear goggles, and has impaired night vision. Swingley did not expect his young team to be competitive.
- Aily Zirkle: Former Yukon Quest champion.

=== Dogs ===
Gebhardt's dog Rita dropped dead while in harness en route from Anvik on March 12. According to the veterinarians there were no signs of abuse, so Gebhardt was allowed to continue and left the checkpoint. Reports indicate he was "downcast" or "devastated", and according to veterinarian Bill Daly he was crying. A preliminary necropsy indicates the cause of death was anemia, from gastric ulcers. This was the first canine fatality of the race. Despite the weather, there are few cases of hyperthermia (overheating). Two dogs died during the 2004 Iditarod.

Nellie, Doug Swingley's dog died in Anchorage on March 17, after being dropped off in Elim at March 15 with pneumonia. The gross necropsy indicated an intestinal abnormality (a double intussusception), and more tests are pending.

Oakley, Jason Barron's dog died on March 17 on the way to Nome from Safety. The gross necropsy revealed no cause of death, and more tests are pending.

Tyson, Michael Salvisberg's dog died on March 18. Tyson was dropped in White Mountain and transported to Nome. The dog was tied to the ski of the plane but the lead came loose and Tyson ran onto the ice of the Bering Sea, fell into open water, and drowned.

Both sides in the controversy about whether the race constitutes dog abuse weigh in fringe news sources

A team of veterinarians from Oklahoma State University are studying the dogs of the Iditarod as part of a Department of Defense grant to determine how dogs can run up to 10 hours without fatigue.

Dogs dropped at the checkpoints during the race were flown to one of the regional hubs at Unalakleet, McGrath, or Anchorage and then to Hiland Mountain-Meadow Creek Correctional Center in Eagle River, where they were cared for by minimum security inmates who volunteered for the responsibility.

The race averages 3 dog deaths per year.

== Awards ==
A purse of $750,107 was split among the finishers. The winner received $72,066.67, and a new truck, and the top 30 shared $705,000. The rest of the finishers shared the remaining $45,107.

ITC (March 21, 2005)
Award	Winner	Conditions	Prize
Spirit of Alaska	Robert Sørlie	1st to McGrath	$500 air credit
Dorothy G. Page Halfway	Robert Sørlie	1st to Iditarod	$3,000 in gold nuggets
First Musher to the Yukon	Paul Gebhardt	1st to Anvik	$3,500 and 7-course meal
Gold Coast	Robert Sørlie	1st to Unalakleet	$2,500 in gold coins
Fastest Time from Safety to Nome	Ken Anderson	best in top 20 (2 h, 20 min)	$500
Most Improved Musher	Harmony Barron	68th to 29th place
Rookie of the Year	Bjørnar Andersen		$1,500
Sportsmanship	Martin Buser		$1,000 gift certificate
Most Inspirational Musher	Martin Buser		$1,000 worth of gas
Golden Clipboard	Shaktoolik checkpoint	best support
Golden Stethoscope	Ingrid Wilk Haugbjorg	most helpful veterinarian	$500
Leonhard Seppala Humanitarian	Aliy Zirkle		2 round-trip tickets
Lolly Medley Golden Harness	Whitestock (Sørlie)	best lead dog	$500
Red Lantern	Phil Morgan	last to finish
