= Sockeye (disambiguation) =

Sockeye is a species of salmon.

Sockeye may also refer to:

- USCGC Sockeye (WPB-87337), a United States Coast Guard cutter
- Seattle Sockeye, a men's ultimate team based in Seattle, Washington, US
- Richmond Sockeyes, an ice hockey team from Richmond, British Columbia, Canada

== See also ==
- Sockeye Fire, a 2015 wildfire in Alaska, US
