= DeeDee Jonrowe =

American kennel owner and dog musher

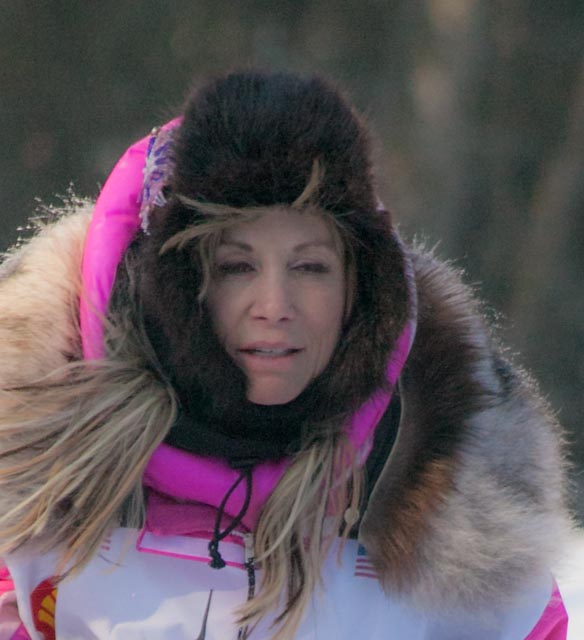
- DeeDee Jonrowe at the ceremonial start of the 2013 Iditarod

Personal information
- Full name: DeeDee Ann Jonrowe
- Nationality: American
- Born: DeeDee Ann Stout; December 20, 1953 (age 72) Frankfurt, Germany
- Education: University of Alaska Fairbanks

Sport
- Sport: Dogsled racing
- Event: Iditarod Trail Sled Dog Race

DeeDee Ann Jonrowe (née Stout; born December 20, 1953) is an American kennel owner and dog musher who is a three-time runner up in the Iditarod Trail Sled Dog Race. She is a very popular figure in the sport, and her completion of the 1,049-mile+ (1,600+ km) race in 2003 just three weeks after completing chemotherapy for breast cancer received widespread publicity.

== History ==
Jonrowe was born on December 20, 1953, in Frankfurt, Germany. Her father, U.S. Army officer Kenneth Oliver Stout, was stationed there at the time. She went to school in Virginia, and in 1971 her family moved to Alaska where she received a B.S. in Biological Sciences and Renewable Resources from the University of Alaska Fairbanks. In 1977, she married Mike Jonrowe.

Jonrowe has also been the spokesperson for the Winter Special Olympics, and the National Girl Scouts Council, and was awarded the Young Women's Christian Association's Alaska Woman of Achievement Award. She co-wrote the book Iditarod Dreams about prepping for the 1993 and 1994 Iditarods, with Lew Freedman.

Jonrowe lives in Willow, Alaska with her husband. She is a kennel owner, and continues racing. By 1979, she had a kennel with 25 dogs. She is a founder of Mush with P.R.I.D.E. (Providing Responsible Information on a Dog's Environment). She is active in her church.

A dog kennel owned by Jonrowe in Willow was destroyed by the 2015 Sockeye fire. Jonrowe also lost her home, several pets and a flock of chickens in the fire. Neither DeeDee Jonrowe or her husband were injured in the fire.

Iditarod finishes
Year	Position	Time (h:min:s)
1980	24th	17 days, 07:59:24
1981	31st	16 days, 05:05:43
1983	15th	13 days, 18:10:25
1984	30th	15 days, 19:18:13
1987	22nd	13 days, 02:58:15
1988	9th	13 days, 16:29:06
1989	9th	11 days, 37:14:16
1990	4th	11 days, 14:41:31
1991	7th	13 days, 13:44:10
1992	5th	11 days, 09:05:00
1993	2nd	10 days, 16:10:50
1994	9th	11 days, 04:25:15
1995	4th	9 days, 11:24:07
1996	2nd	9 days, 20:18:00
1997	4th	9 days, 18:26:10
1998	2nd	9 days, 08:26:10
1999	—	(Scratched)
2000	20th	10 days, 04:24:04
2001	10th	11 days, 14:33:15
2002	16th	9 days, 22:07:20
2003	18th	10 days, 23:45:39
2004	15th	10 days, 08:40:49
2005	10th	10 days, 01:42:55
2006	4th	9 days, 16:25:50
2007	—	(Scratched)
2008	15th	10days, 1:07:46
2009	13th	10days, 22:56:10
2010	22nd	10days, 2:47:44
2011	12th	9days, 10:24:17
2012	10th	9 days, 14:43:15
2013	10th	9days, 13:24:39
2014	—	(Scratched)

== Racing ==
In 1978, DeeDee Jonrowe competed in her first dog sled race, the Women's Fur Rendezvous World Championship in Anchorage. She has competed in many dog sled races, including the Copper Basin 300 (which she won in 2001), the Klondike 300, and the John Beargrease Dog Sled Race.

Jonrowe competed in her first Iditarod in 1980, and again in 1981, 1983, 1984, and then in every race since 1987 for a total of 23 races and 22 finishes. In 1988, she placed in the top 10 for the first time (9th), and has placed in the top 10 a total of 15 times. While she has never won the race, she was the 2nd-place finisher in three races (1996, 1993, and 1998). Her 1998 finish in second place with a time of 9 days, 8 hours, 26 minutes, and 10 seconds is the fastest time recorded for a woman. She is the only musher who competed in both the Iditarod and the Alpirod for three straight years (1992, 1993, and 1994). She has won a total of USD $335,804.

She is most widely known because of the publicity surrounding three setbacks. In 1996, an automobile accident outside Fairbanks, Alaska killed her grandmother, and both Jonrowe and her husband were hospitalized. She trained while recovering from her injuries, and placed 4th in the 1997 Iditarod. A more minor incident was a dog mutiny on the Yukon River in 1999. While racing the Iditarod, her dogs refused to go into a strong headwind and she was forced to scratch for the first time. She was forced to scratch in the 2007 Iditarod after suffering from hand and other injuries after sustaining a fall near the Rainy Pass checkpoint.

In July 2002, Jonrowe was diagnosed with breast cancer. Three weeks after completing chemotherapy, she competed in the Iditarod, placing 18th. The story was widely publicized, and in 2003 she won the Most Inspirational Musher Award, and was named the honorary chair of the American Cancer Society's Relay for Life.

Dog mushing in Alaska can be hazardous. According to Women Warriors (2004) Jonrowe said, "I've had back surgery, frozen my shoulder, broken my hand…I think I've had every single cold related injury. I haven't had any amputations, but I have had severe frostbite on my fingers, cheeks and nose. I even frostbit my corneas some years ago".

Numerous items pertaining to Jonrowe's career, including a parka, dog tags, and trading cards, are in the collection of the National Museum of American History.

Other racing achievements
Year	Race	Achievement
1981	Iditarod	Sportsmanship Award (chosen by other mushers)
1991	Iditarod	Dorothy G. Page Halfway Award (1st to Iditarod)
1991	Iditarod	Leonhard Seppala Humanitarian Award (best dog care in top 10)
1993	Iditarod	Most Inspirational Musher Award (chosen by other mushers)
1997	Iditarod	Joe Redington, Sr. Award (drawing)
2001	Copper Basin	1st place
2003	Iditarod	Most Inspirational Musher Award (chosen by other mushers)
