= Junior Iditarod =

Sled dog race in Alaska, United States

The Junior Iditarod Sled Dog Race, or Jr. Iditarod, is a 148- to 158-mile (222 km) sled dog race for mushers between the ages of 14 through 17, which is patterned after the 1,150-mile Iditarod Trail Sled Dog Race that is said to be 1,049 miles (1,688.2 km). The race is held outside Anchorage in the U.S. state of Alaska, and was the first long-distance race for juvenile mushers.

== History ==
With the encouragement of "Go for it" Joe Redington, Senior, the Jr. Iditarod was established 1977 by Eric Beeman, Rome Gilman, Karl Clausen, Kenny Pugh, and Clarence Shockley, who were unable to compete in the Iditarod because they were less than 18 years of age. In October 1987, the Jr. Iditarod officially became part of the Iditarod Trail Committee, which manages the senior race.

ITC. Trail.
Route
Settler's Bay to Knik (8 mi/13 km)
Knik to Burma Road (9 mi/14 km)
Burma Road to Susitna River (23 mi/37 km)
Susitna River to Eagle Song (14 mi/23 km)
Eagle Song to Yentna Station (15 mi/24 km)
8- to 12-hour layover
Yentna Station to Eagle Song (15 mi/24 km)
Eagle Song to Susitna River (14 mi/23 km)
Susitna River to Burma Road (23 mi/37 km)
Burma Road to Knik (9 mi/14 km) A common route runs from
Settler's Bay to Knik, (8 mi/13 km)
Finish
Distance: 138 mi (222 km)

The Jr. Iditarod race is designed as a long-distance race, as opposed to a "sprint, or speed race", and is intended to help prepare younger mushers for the even longer Iditarod. The race commonly runs from Settler's Bay for 69 miles (111 km) along the Iditarod Trail to the Yetna Station Roadhouse. Trail location may vary year to year depending on trail conditions and due to poor conditions locally has started and finished in the Willow as well as the Lake Louise areas. At the half way point mushers must care for their sled dogs and camp overnight for either 8 or 12 hours, before returning the following day. The first Jr. Iditarod had junior, kids 11 through 13 years of age and running 4 to six dogs, and senior divisions, kids 14 through 17 years running a maximum of 10 dogs. the junior division ran a total of 18 miles and 40 miles (58 and 64 km), for the senior class respectively. Senior mushers spent the night camping with their dogs at Mud Lake in the Big lake area. By the second year due to logistics, the two divisions were abolished, age was now 14 through 17, and the distance was increased to 90 miles (145 km) in 1978, and then to 120 miles (193 km) in 1979. Each team is composed of between 5 and 10 sled dogs, and is required to carry the same equipment as the competitors in the Iditarod.

The Jr. Iditarod is held in the weekend before the Iditarod. The winner of the junior event takes the honorary first position out of the chute during the ceremonial start of the longer race in Anchorage on the first Saturday in March, and leads the pack to the first checkpoint, normally 20 miles (32 km) away in Eagle River.

Jr. Iditarod mushers are mostly from Alaska, though the U.S. states of Minnesota and Montana Montana, Massachusetts, Ohio, Georgia, Washington, Pennsylvania, Yukon Territory, Canada, have been represented, and Thomas Krejci of Czechoslovakia became the first international competitor in 1992, also winning the Humanitarian Award that year. In 2017, Katie Winrich was the first competitor to run the race to hail from Wisconsin. All mushers are between the ages of 14 and 18, and frequently train their own teams of sled dogs. A number of previous competitors have gone on to compete in the longer Iditarod, including Lance Mackey, Tim Osmar, Ramey Smyth, and Cim Smyth, to name but a few.

$15,000 in scholarship money was awarded last year. Of primary concern to Jr. Iditarod are animal care, sportsmanship and furthering education, as well as promotion of our sport. The first three finishers receive $5,000, $2,500, and $1,500, respectively. The winners of the Sportsmanship Award, chosen by their fellow mushers; and the Humanitarian Award, chosen by the race veterinarians, win $1,000 each. The winner also receives round-trip tickets to the Iditarod Awards Banquet in Nome with their parents. All finishers receive a trophy, a patch, and prizes donated by local businesses. Other awards are the Blue Harness, given to the best lead dog; the Rookie of the Year, given to the top musher among those competing for the first time; and the Red Lantern, given to the last to finish.

2021 will see the race be modified resulting from COVID-19 pandemic; strict measures such as competitors wearing masks and social distancing will take effect.

== 2005 Jr. Iditarod ==
The 28th annual Jr. Iditarod in 2005 had 21 competitors, including 11 females, 10 males. Twelve were rookies running their first Jr. Iditarod. All were from Alaska, though one of the two entrants who withdrew before the start of the race were from Colorado.

Melissa Owens won on February 27, in 10 hours, 51 minutes, 27 seconds. On March 5 she was the first musher out of the chute during the ceremonial first leg of the 2005 Iditarod, representing honorary musher Jirdes Winther Baxter, the last known survivor of the children who were saved from a diphtheria epidemic by the historic 1925 serum run to Nome. Second and third place went to Rohn Buser and Dallas Seavey, sons of former Iditarod champions Martin Buser and Mitch Seavey. Dallas Seavey, whose birthday is on March 4, became the first musher to compete in both the Jr. Iditarod and the Iditarod in the same year. The Red Lantern was Amy Gundlach.

== List of Jr. Iditarod winners ==
ITC (2005). Media.
Year	Musher
1978	Mike Neuman Senior Division, Joe Good Junior Division
1979	Clint Mayeur,
1980	Gary Baumgartner
1981	Christine Delia
1982	Tim Osmar
1983	Tim Osmar
1984	Tim Osmar
1985	Lance Barve
1986	Lance Barve
1987	Dusty VanMeter
1988	Dan Flodin
1989	Jared Jones
1990	Jared Jones
1991	Brian Hanson
1992	Ramey Smyth
1993	Ramey Smyth
1994	Cim Smyth
1995	Dusty Whittemore
1996	Dusty Whittemore
1997	Tony Willis
1998	Charlie Jordan
1999	Ryan Redington
2000	Ryan Redington
2001	Tyrell Seavey
2002	Cali King
2003	Ellie Claus
2004	Nicole Osmar
2005	Melissa Owens
2006	Micah T. Degarlund
2007	Rohn Buser
2008	Jessica Klejka
2009	Cain Carter
2010	Merissa Osmar
2011	Jeremiah Klejka
2012	Conway Seavey
2013	Noah Pereira
2014	Conway Seavey
2015	Kevin Harper
