= John Baker (musher) =

American dog musher, pilot, and motivational speaker

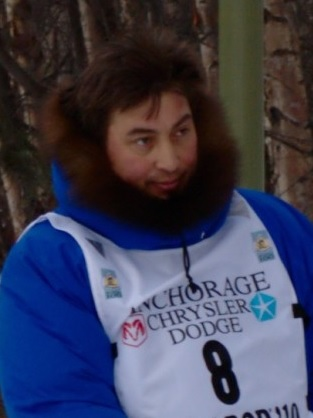
- Baker during the ceremonial start of the 2010 Iditarod

Personal information
- Native name: Quniaq
- Nationality: American
- Spouse: Katherine Keith

Sport
- Sport: Sled dog racing
- Event: Iditarod Trail Sled Dog Race

John Quniaq Baker (born 1962 or 1963 in Kotzebue, Alaska) is a self-employed American dog musher, pilot and motivational speaker of Inupiaq descent who once consistently placed in the top 10 during the long distance Iditarod Trail Sled Dog Race. Baker won the 2011 Iditarod with a finish time of 8 Days 19 Hours 46 Minutes 39 Seconds.

== Mushing career ==
Baker started mushing at age 14. He raced in his first Iditarod in 1996, placing 22nd. By his third race he placed in the top 10, and he sustained that position for six of the next seven years (from the 1998 to the 2005 Iditarods), only dropping to 22nd once again in 2000 due to dog trouble. His second best finish was in 2002, when he crossed the finish line in 3rd place in 9 days, 5 hours, 46 minutes, and 30 seconds. In 1998, he won both the Dorothy G. Page Halfway Award and the Regal Alaskan's First Musher to the Yukon Award. He competed in every race from the 1996 to the 2017 Iditarod. In the 2009 Iditarod, he finished in 3rd place. He has 24 dogs.

Like Ramy Brooks, Baker is one of the few Alaska Native dog sled racers who compete in the modern Iditarod.

=== Animal abuse allegations ===
In 2018, a former employee accused Baker of abusing dogs. Baker denied the allegations, which were promoted by PETA, a longtime critic of dog mushing.

Baker withdrew from the then-upcoming 2018 Iditarod following the accusations against him, saying that he had never planned to compete and had only registered to support the race.

In 2019, further abuse allegations emerged from another former dog handler. The story was once again spread by PETA and was denied by Baker's spouse Katherine Keith, a fellow musher.

Other former handlers either denied or would not confirm the allegations, and images used to support the 2018 accusation later proved to be from internet postings not related to Baker.

Year	Position	Time (h:min:s)
1996	22nd	10 days, 23:26:00
1997	11th	9 days, 23:09:36
1998	5th	9 days, 21:43:09
1999	8th	10 days, 10:10:54
2000	22nd	10 days, 05:48:29
2001	6th	10 days, 21:00:30
2002	3rd	9 days, 05:46:30
2003	8th	10 days, 07:33:07
2004	9th	10 days, 00:43:00
2005	6th	9 days, 21:41:00
2006	5th	9 days, 17:37:45
2011	1st	8 days, 19:46:39
2012	9th	9 days, 13:25:47
2013	21st	9 days, 21:49:16
2014	19th	9 days, 18:19:15
2015	21st	9 days, 22:12:58
2016	17th	9 days, 05:45:05
2017	18th	9 days, 05:50:30

== Personal life ==
Baker worked as a pilot and manager of his family's air taxi business. He also visits local schools as a motivational lecturer.

Baker lives near his extended family on the coast of the Chukchi Sea in Kotzebue, Alaska, and has a fish camp/winter cabin 30 mi (50 km) away, across Kobuk Lake. His son Alex has competed in the Junior Iditarod. He also has a daughter, Tahayla. Baker is married to musher Katherine Keith; the couple run four businesses and two nonprofit organizations in the Kotzebue region. They married after Keith ran in the 2018 Iditarod.

Baker is of Inupiaq and Jewish heritage. His grandmother, Clara Rotman (née Levy), was born in Kiana, Alaska in 1914. She was born to a Native Alaskan mother and a Jewish father and was raised Jewish and cherished her Jewish heritage. In 2011, Baker became the first Jew and the first Inuk to win the Iditarod.
