= Rachael Scdoris =

American dog musher and cross country runner

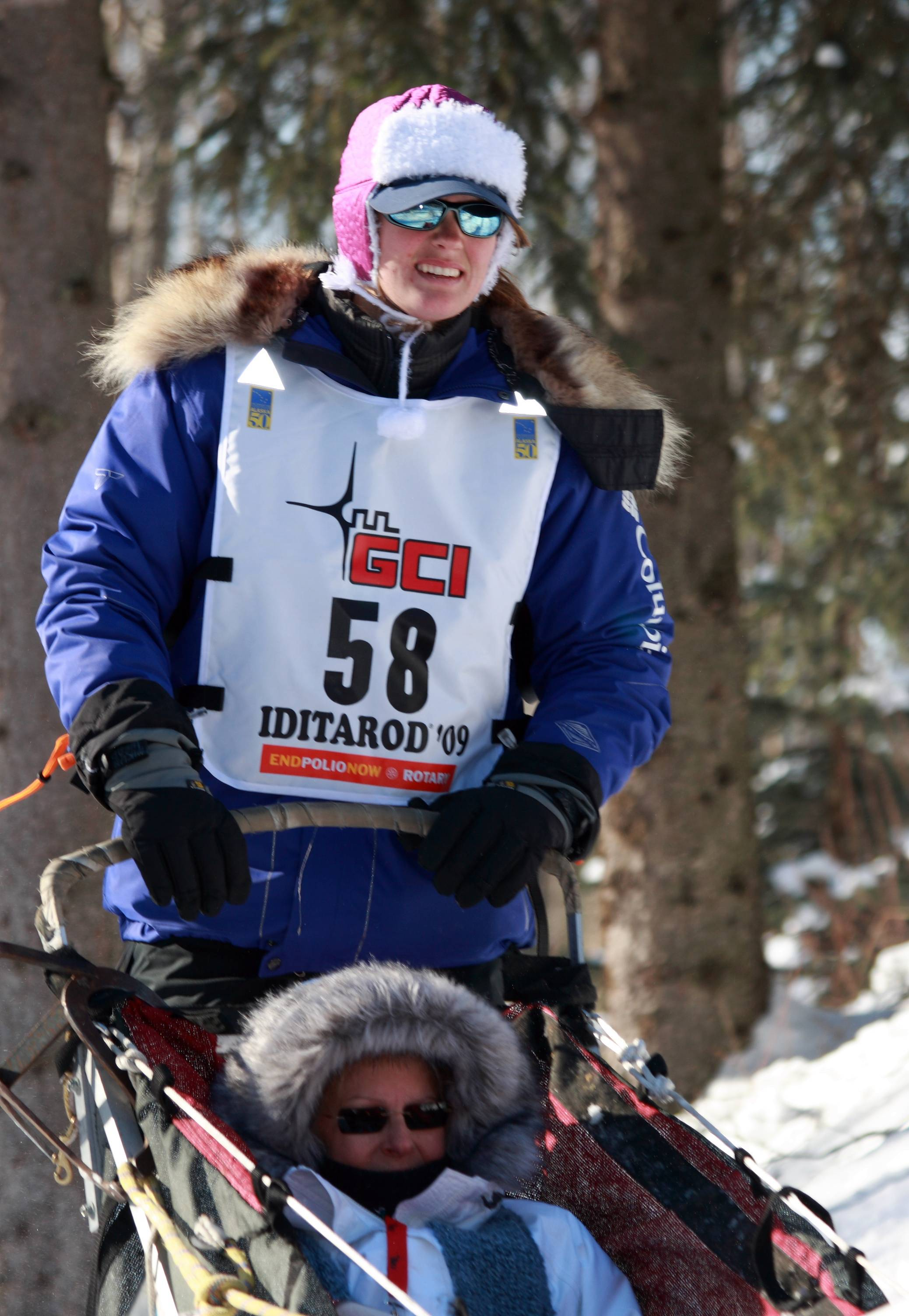
Rachael Scdoris - 2009 Iditarod Ceremonial Start in Anchorage

Rachael Scdoris /səˈdɔərɪs/ (born February 1, 1985, in Bend, Oregon) is an American dog musher and cross country runner who in 2006 became the first legally blind person to complete the 1,049+ mile (1,600 km) Iditarod Trail Sled Dog Race across the U.S. state of Alaska.

Scdoris had her best result in the 2009 Iditarod, taking the Southern route for the first time. Visually guided by Tim Osmar, making his first re-entry into the race since a catastrophic ankle injury incurred while protecting his home from a wildfire in 2007, Scdoris came in 45th, beating her previous best of 57th.

== Biography ==
Scdoris was born with congenital achromatopsia, an uncorrectable visual disorder. Her vision is 20/200, and she is totally color blind.

In 1997, Scdoris competed her first dog sled race, and placed 4th in the Frog Lake Race, and later won several local short-distance races. In 2001, she competed in the 500 mile (805 km) International Pedigree Stage Stop Sled Dog Race, and became the first legally blind person and the youngest musher to complete an event of that distance. Rachael carried the Olympic Torch for the 2002 Winter Games.

In 2003, the Iditarod Trail Committee approved her request under the Americans with Disabilities Act of 1990 for special accommodations to compete in the much longer and more rigorous Iditarod. Scdoris completed the qualifying races in 2004, placing 11th in the 350-mile (563 km) Race to the Sky in Montana, and 6th in the 400-mile (644 km) John Beargrease Mid-Distance Marathon in Minnesota.

On March 5 she started the 2005 Iditarod in Anchorage, Alaska, with "visual interpreter" Paul Ellering, who warned her of trail conditions by radio or shouting. The two-way radios broke several times during the race during crashes, which are relatively common especially among rookies. "I had a nice little encounter with a tree... the tree won". She eventually had to quit the race because her dogs showed signs of sickness.

In the 2006 Iditarod, Rachael Scdoris fell asleep while mushing and became separated from Tim Osmar, her visual guide. She awoke in a place that had no tracks from other dog teams, which meant that her dogs had no scent to follow. Scdoris guided her team over jumble ice and open leads into the Koyuk checkpoint:

"Scdoris said she had fallen asleep on the sled, as many mushers do, and veered off the trail.

'It was so flat and so early in the morning, it was hard not to doze,' Scdoris said. 'I woke up in jumbled ice and no other dog tracks.'

As it turned out, Scdoris was close enough to Koyuk to make out the lights of the village and guide her dog team there."

- Jeannette J. Lee, Associated Press, March 19, 2006

== Surname ==
Scdoris is descended from people named Saadoris, but somehow a typo crept into the official spelling of the name.
