= Sockeye Fire =

2015 wildfire in Alaska, United States

- Date: June 14, 2015 – July 22, 2015
- Location: Matanuska-Susitna Valley, Alaska
- Coordinates: 61.845°N 150.086°W

Statistics
- Burned area: 7,220 acres (29 km^{2})

Impacts
- Injuries: 4
- Structures lost: 55 Residences destroyed

Ignition
- Cause: Residents burning on their property without proper safety precautions

Map
- Location within Alaska

The Sockeye Fire was a 2015 wildfire that occurred near Willow, in the Matanuska-Susitna Valley, Alaska. By the time the fire was contained, 7,220 acres (29 km^{2}) of land had burned. The fire received its name because its origin was traced to Sockeye Avenue, in Willow. The fire forced the closure of the George Parks Highway near the fire, closing the primary road link between Anchorage and Fairbanks. Mandatory evacuations were ordered for residents and visitors between Milepost 69 and 77 of the highway. Authorities urged the residents of Willow to evacuate, utilizing the Emergency Alert System throughout the afternoon of June 14 as the fire spread and intensified. Alaska Governor Bill Walker declared a state of emergency for the area on June 15. Authorities requested help from fire crews throughout Alaska, as well as from emergency agencies in the contiguous United States. The Anchorage Fire Department, Alaska's largest, sent a task force of personnel and emergency vehicles.

== Events ==
The fire was first reported on June 14, after a local resident called 9-1-1 to report heavy smoke in a wooded area near Willow, along the Parks Highway. Dry conditions in the area along with the prevailing winds caused the fire to quickly spread. By the morning of Monday, June 15, the fire had grown to over 6,500 acres (26 km^{2}), and had destroyed 40–45 structures, roughly half of which were primary homes occupied by local residents, with the other half being described as "secondary structures". Local schools and churches were used as emergency shelters. In addition to Willow, air quality has been affected in the communities of Nancy Lake, Houston, and Big Lake.

The Sockeye Fire has impacted the sled dog teams living in the area, with as many as 4,500 dogs moved away from the impacted areas. Other sled dogs, owned by local participants of the Iditarod Trail Sled Dog Race and other mushing events, perished in the fire. A local kennel owned by veteran Iditarod musher DeeDee Jonrowe was destroyed. Jonrowe also lost her home, several pets and a flock of chickens in the fire. At least six dogs are known to have perished in the fire.

== Cause ==
Early on during the incident, emergency officials determined that the fire was "human caused".

On July 13, 2015 it was reported by multiple news sources in Alaska that Greg Imig and Amy Dewitt of Anchorage faced numerous charges in relation to the Sockeye Fire, including reckless endangerment, criminally negligent burning, and allowing a fire to spread. The newly engaged couple were reportedly vacationing at a cabin Dewitt owned. On the evening of June 13, they reportedly lit numerous fireworks, and ignited several burn piles they subsequently failed to ensure were properly extinguished before retiring for the evening. The following afternoon reports came in to local authorities of a fire near their cabin, including a 911 call Dewitt herself made, though she reportedly did not offer any identifying details to the operator, including the specific address of the fire. The couple later admitted to investigators that they then quickly fled the cabin, leaving behind numerous items out in the open. They told the police they did so because a "a wall of fire" coming from forest onto their property made it dangerous to remain. They stopped along the road and advised other local residents to flee as well.

The couple was found not guilty on all charges in 2017. Prior to trial, fire investigators excluded fireworks as the cause of the fire. In addition, the point of origin for the fire was not on the Imigs' property. The prosecution theory, therefore, focused on the possibility that heat from a burn pile the day before had traveled through the subsurface peat until it encountered and ignited microfuels deeper in the forest. That theory was disputed by the defense wildfire experts.
