= Robert Sørlie =

Norwegian dog musher and sled racer

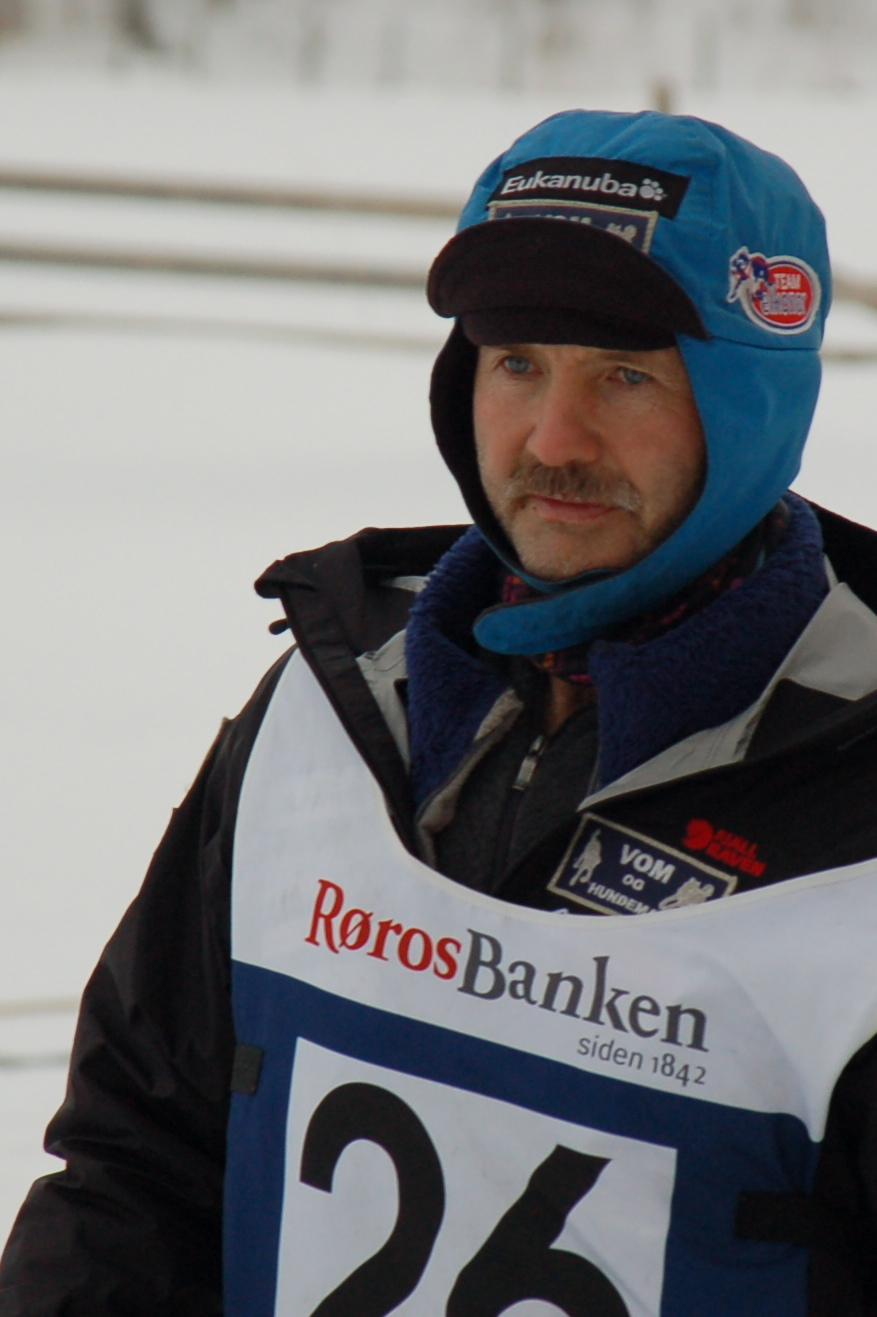
Robert Sørlie in February 2014.

Robert Walter Sørlie (born 15 February 1958), (pronounced: /sir-lee/) commonly "Sorlie" in English, is a two-time Iditarod champion Norwegian dog musher and dog sled racer from Hurdal Municipality. Together with Kjetil Backen and his nephew, Bjørnar Andersen, he forms "Team Norway", the most well-known Norwegian dog mushing team. In 2003, he became the second non-American after Martin Buser to win the 1,049-mile Iditarod Trail Sled Dog Race across Alaska, U.S. He won it again in 2005.

== Norwegian races ==
Sørlie has been racing dogs since the 1970s, and has won numerous races starting in 1991, including Femundløpet (thirteen times) and Europe's longest dog race, Finnmarksløpet (1995, 1999, and 2001). He has won the Norwegian long-distance championship twice (1993 and 1995), and the mid-distance championship once (1992). In 2008 Sørlie won the inaugural Amundsen Race, a 400 km race from Östersund, Sweden, to Røros, Norway, edging out Bjørnar Andersen by just one minute.

== Iditarod ==
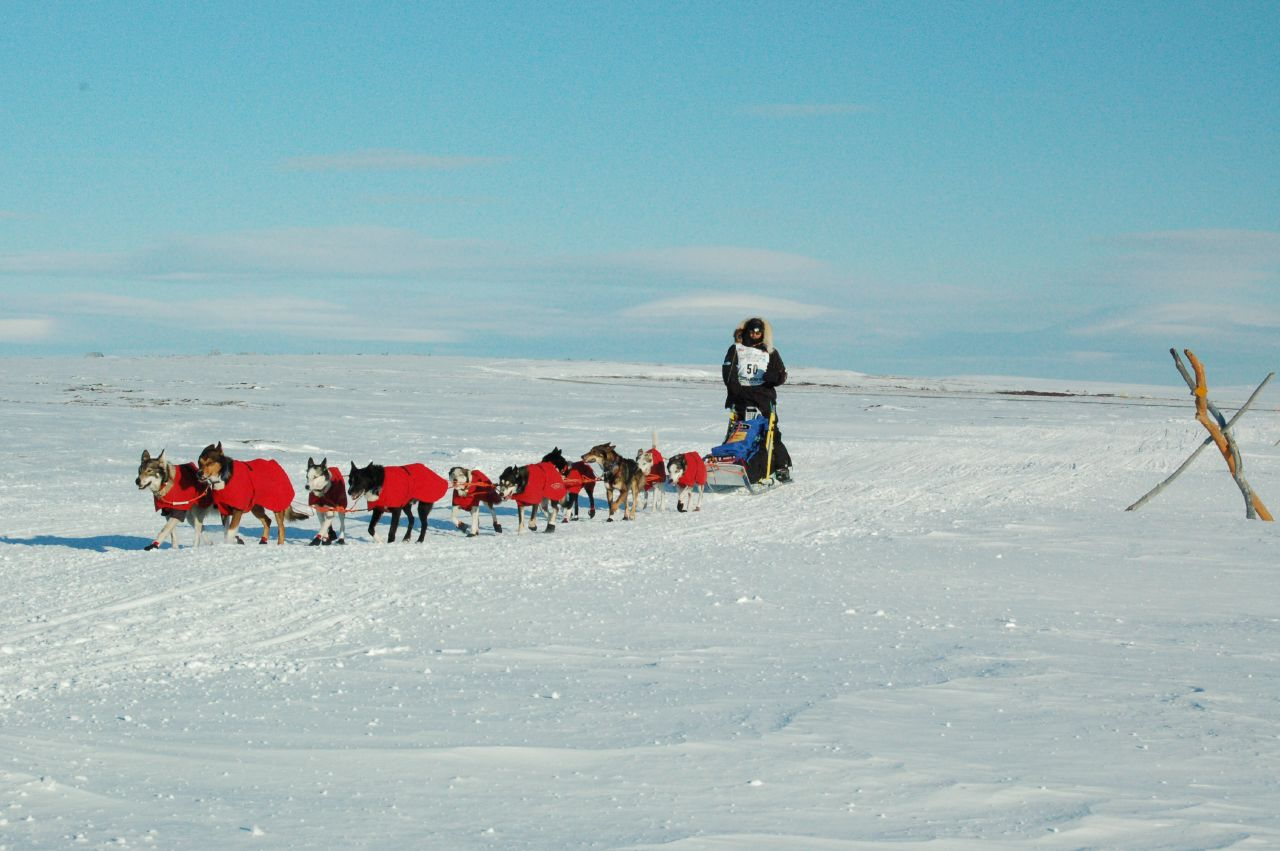
Sørlie nearing Nome in the 2007 Iditarod.

Sørlie ran the Iditarod for the first time in 2002, placing 9th, which won him the "Rookie of the Year" award. The following year he won the race in 9 days, 15 hours, 47 minutes, and 36 seconds, becoming the first non-North American resident to win the race. Since he was in the lead for most of the route he picked up many of the "lesser" trophies for being first to various checkpoints along the way. The course was altered that year due to lack of good snow cover, and although Sørlie was obviously a skilled musher with a strong dog team, some claimed the win was affected by the new course.

After holding a tight lead for most of the 2005 race, he won, once again amid warmer than average temperatures and subsequent challenging driving conditions. He and his dogs ran against a very competitive field, including five other previous winners of the Iditarod, and he finished only 34 minutes ahead of second place. Bjørnar Andersen finished in fourth place, while Kjetil Backen did not mush, but instead acted as team tactician. The race this year followed a more traditional route.

== Personal life ==
Sørlie has been living with Elin Pedersen since 1980, and together they have two sons, Håkon and Magnus. When he is not mushing, he works as a firefighter at Oslo Airport.
