= Bjørnar Andersen =

Norwegian dog musher

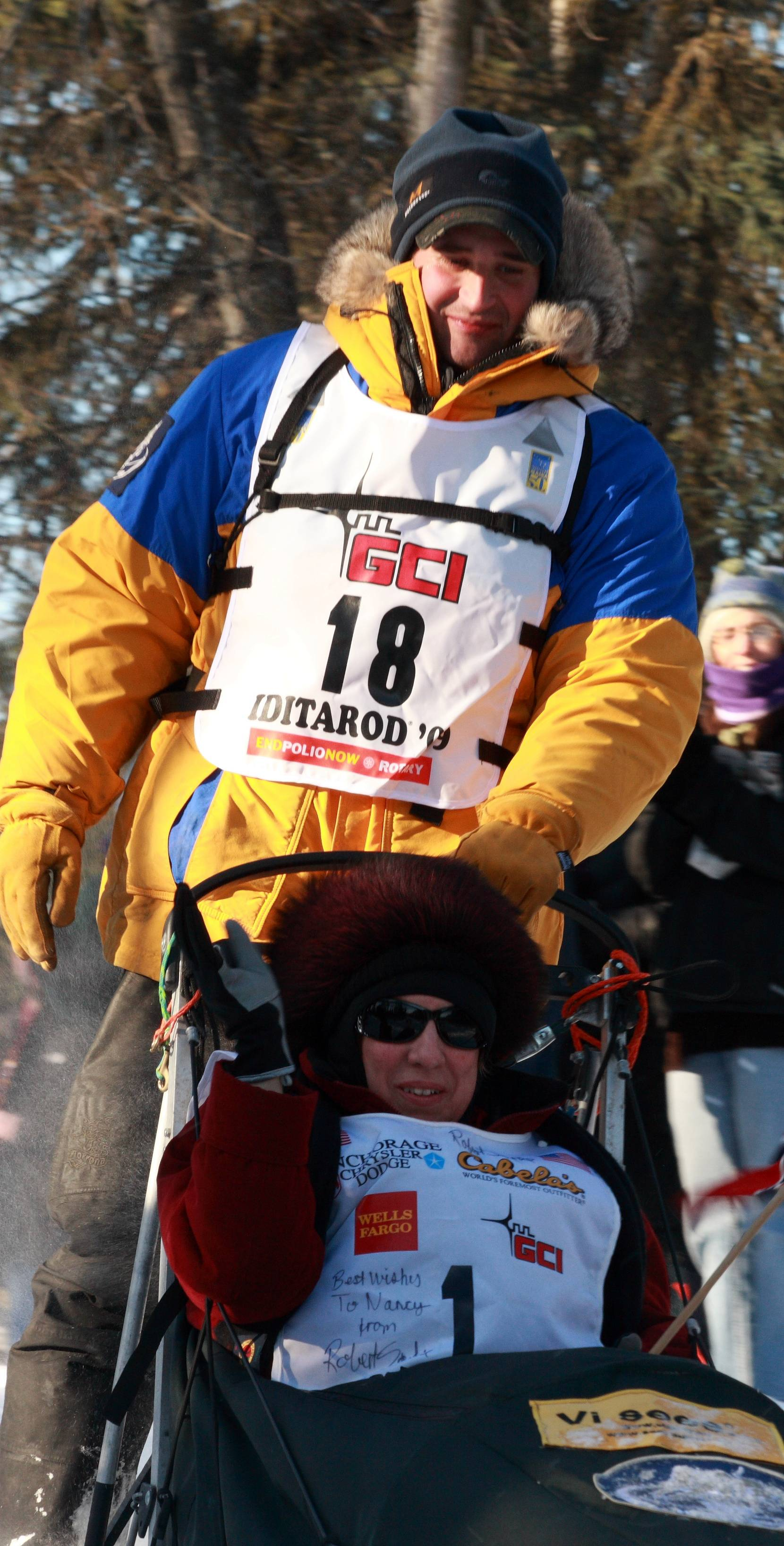
Bjørnar Andersen at the ceremonial start of the 2009 Iditarod

Bjørnar Andersen (born 1978), commonly Bjornar in English is a Norwegian refrigerator mechanic and dog musher who has won all the long-distance dog sled races in Norway, and placed fourth in the 2005 Iditarod across the U.S. state of Alaska, in his rookie outing.

Andersen was born in 1978, and began competing in dog sled races in 1991. He is the nephew of Robert Sørlie, the 2003 and 2005 Iditarod Trail Sled Dog Race champion, and together with Kjetil Backen they form Team Norway.

Andersen placed third in the 300 km (200 mi) Femundløpet dog sled race in 1999, placed second in the 500 km (300 mi) Femundløpet in 2002 and 2004, and won in 2003. Andersen also won the 1,000 km (500 mi) Finnmarksløpet in 2004.

Andersen finished the 1,868 km (1,161 mi) 2005 Iditarod dog sled race in 4th place with a time of 9 days, 19 hours, 50 minutes, and 38 seconds, and won the Rookie of the Year Award. This is the highest position a first-time competitor in the race has won since the first Iditarods in the 1970s, when all or most of the racers were rookies. His uncle Robert Sørlie took first place, for the second time. According to Andersen, "my biggest challenge in the 2005 Iditarod race is the fact that I am a rookie and consequently do not know the trail". (Cabela's, 2005)

Andersen is a full-time refrigeration mechanic, and runs dogs in his spare time. He lives in the forests to the southeast of Oslo, near Siggerud.
