= Alpirod =

Defunct European sled dog race

The Alpirod is a defunct 1,000 kilometres (621 mi) sled dog stage race in Southern Europe. Its name comes from a combination of the Alps, where the race took place, and the Iditarod Trail Sled Dog Race, upon which the race was based. The competition consisted of a 14-day stage race in 11 cities in four countries: Italy, Germany, Austria and France. The competition consisted of multiple short races separated by evening breaks, similar to cycling's Tour de France. At the time, it was the largest sled dog race outside North America. The race was organized by Armen Khatchikian, an Italian Iditarod competitor who hoped to bring a form of that race to Europe. It first took place in 1988, and the inaugural race was won by Alaska racer Joe Runyan. In 1989, the race was won by Kathy Swenson. She was the first woman to win the race. In 1990, Alaskan Roxy Wright Champaine won the race, becoming the third American winner. In 1992, the race was won by Nenana, Alaska musher Jacques Philip, who went on to win the race three times.

Despite its initial success, it soon ran into difficulties. Fundraising and obtaining sponsors for the race proved difficult, and the competition was hampered by a lack of snow. In addition, the limited popularity of long-distance mushing outside North America crippled participation, as did the £10,000 cost to fly a dog team from Alaska to Italy. These factors caused the race to be shortened to 700 kilometres (435 mi) in the early 1990s and shortened again to fewer than 500 kilometres (311 mi) for the 1994 race. Prior to the 1996 race, the competition's primary sponsor, dog food manufacturer Royal Canin, ended its support of the competition and organizers announced its cancellation. Despite hopes that the race would find a new title sponsor to support its $150,000 purse, no sponsor emerged.

The Alpirod was a pioneer in the use of dog microchip identification, requiring it several years before the Yukon Quest or Iditarod made the process mandatory.

The unofficial successor to the Alpirod is the AlpenTrail, a 300 kilometres (186 mi) sled dog race in the Alps started by several of the Alpirod's organizers.
