= Willow, Alaska =

- CDP
- Location in Matanuska-Susitna Borough and the state of Alaska

- Location within the state of Alaska
- Coordinates: 61°46′10″N 149°59′28″W
- Country: United States
- State: Alaska
- Borough: Matanuska-Susitna

Government
  - Borough mayor: Edna DeVries
  - State senator: Mike Shower (R)
  - State rep.: Kevin McCabe (R)

Area
  - Total: 698.57 sq mi (1,809.30 km^{2})
  - Land: 690.47 sq mi (1,788.31 km^{2})
  - Water: 8.10 sq mi (20.99 km^{2})
- Elevation: 213 ft (65 m)

Population (2020)
  - Total: 2,196
  - Density: 3.2/sq mi (1.23/km^{2})
- Time zone: UTC-9 (Alaska (AKST))
  - Summer (DST): UTC-8 (AKDT)
- ZIP codes: 99683, 99688
- Area code: 907
- FIPS code: 02-85280
- GNIS feature ID: 1417146

Willow is a census-designated place (CDP) in the Matanuska-Susitna Borough in the U.S. state of Alaska. Located 26 miles northwest from Wasilla along the George Parks Highway, it is part of the Anchorage, Alaska Metropolitan Statistical Area. At the 2020 census the population was 2,196, up from 2,102 in 2010.

== History ==
The community got its start in 1897 when miners discovered gold on Willow Creek. Ships and boats brought supplies and equipment up Cook Inlet, landing at Knik or Tyonek. From Knik, a 26-mile summer trail went northwesterly. The trail along Willow Creek heading east became Hatcher Pass Road, currently an adventurous scenic road used during the summer tour season.

In 1920, the Alaska Railroad built its Willow station house at mile 185.7 along the tracks leading from Seward to Fairbanks.

During World War II, a radar warning station and airfield were built near the railroad tracks; a post office was established in 1948.

By 1954, Willow Creek was Alaska's largest gold mining district, with a total production approaching 18 million dollars.

Around 1970, before construction of the Parks Highway, Willow had a population of 78 until land disposals, homestead subdivisions, and completion of the George Parks Highway in 1972 fueled growth in the area.

In 1976, Alaskans elected to move the state capital from Juneau to Willow in an effort to improve access for Alaskans while keeping the capital out of Anchorage, the largest city. Landscape architect M. Paul Friedberg created a master plan for the city as part of one such proposal. This fueled interest and land speculation in the area. However, funding to enable the capital move was defeated in the November 1982 election. As a result, Juneau remains the state capital.

More than half of the 1,500 cabins around Willow are for seasonal use. Nearly all of the occupied homes in Willow are fully plumbed, using individual on-site water wells, septic tanks and drain fields.

Willow is now the official host of the Iditarod Trail Sled Dog Race restart.

In June 2015, a large wildfire burned thousands of acres of wilderness, numerous structures and forced the closure of the George Parks Highway, severing the road link between Anchorage and Fairbanks.

== Geography ==
Willow is located at 61°46′10″N 149°59′28″W (61.769345, -149.991065).

According to the United States Census Bureau, the CDP has a total area of 692.9 square miles (1,795 km^{2}), of which, 684.8 square miles (1,774 km^{2}) of it is land and 8.0 square miles (21 km^{2}) of it (1.16%) is water. By area, it is the largest CDP in the United States.

== Climate ==
Willow has a subarctic climate with long and cold winters and mild summers. Whites Crossing is a weather station near Willow, situated at an elevation of 270 ft (82 m).

Climate data for Whites Crossing, Alaska, 1991–2020 normals, 1971–2009 extremes: 270ft (82m)
Month	Jan	Feb	Mar	Apr	May	Jun	Jul	Aug	Sep	Oct	Nov	Dec	Year
Record high °F (°C)	47 (8)	49 (9)	54 (12)	69 (21)	83 (28)	88 (31)	89 (32)	86 (30)	76 (24)	69 (21)	54 (12)	49 (9)	89 (32)
Mean maximum °F (°C)	37.4 (3.0)	40.5 (4.7)	46.4 (8.0)	58.6 (14.8)	73.1 (22.8)	80.2 (26.8)	80.6 (27.0)	77.6 (25.3)	65.9 (18.8)	53.8 (12.1)	39.0 (3.9)	40.1 (4.5)	82.7 (28.2)
Mean daily maximum °F (°C)	15.9 (−8.9)	25.8 (−3.4)	34.4 (1.3)	48.2 (9.0)	61.2 (16.2)	68.6 (20.3)	71.0 (21.7)	67.0 (19.4)	56.6 (13.7)	40.5 (4.7)	22.9 (−5.1)	17.9 (−7.8)	44.2 (6.8)
Daily mean °F (°C)	7.1 (−13.8)	14.1 (−9.9)	20.5 (−6.4)	35.6 (2.0)	47.8 (8.8)	56.5 (13.6)	60.2 (15.7)	56.6 (13.7)	46.8 (8.2)	32.0 (0.0)	14.6 (−9.7)	9.1 (−12.7)	33.4 (0.8)
Mean daily minimum °F (°C)	−1.7 (−18.7)	2.4 (−16.4)	6.6 (−14.1)	23.0 (−5.0)	34.4 (1.3)	44.4 (6.9)	49.4 (9.7)	46.1 (7.8)	36.9 (2.7)	23.5 (−4.7)	6.3 (−14.3)	0.3 (−17.6)	22.6 (−5.2)
Mean minimum °F (°C)	−28.5 (−33.6)	−25.5 (−31.9)	−16.6 (−27.0)	1.2 (−17.1)	23.5 (−4.7)	31.6 (−0.2)	39.0 (3.9)	32.1 (0.1)	20.7 (−6.3)	−0.1 (−17.8)	−17.6 (−27.6)	−25.8 (−32.1)	−35.6 (−37.6)
Record low °F (°C)	−50 (−46)	−48 (−44)	−36 (−38)	−21 (−29)	16 (−9)	28 (−2)	31 (−1)	22 (−6)	5 (−15)	−20 (−29)	−40 (−40)	−42 (−41)	−50 (−46)
Average precipitation inches (mm)	1.17 (30)	0.92 (23)	0.71 (18)	0.83 (21)	0.99 (25)	1.28 (33)	2.15 (55)	3.79 (96)	3.78 (96)	2.97 (75)	1.53 (39)	1.69 (43)	21.81 (554)
Average snowfall inches (cm)	11.5 (29)	10.1 (26)	7.3 (19)	2.7 (6.9)	0.0 (0.0)	0.0 (0.0)	0.0 (0.0)	0.0 (0.0)	0.9 (2.3)	9.2 (23)	15.8 (40)	18.3 (46)	75.8 (192.2)
Average precipitation days (≥ 0.01 in)	7.2	6.5	5.7	4.9	8.4	8.3	10.8	12.9	13.3	10.3	8.5	10.0	106.8
Average snowy days (≥ 0.1 in)	5.2	3.8	3.3	1.3	0.0	0.0	0.0	0.0	0.2	2.6	4.9	6.7	28
Source 1: NOAA (1981-2010 precip/snowfall)
Source 2: XMACIS2 (records & 1981-2009 monthly max/mins)

== Demographics ==
Historical population
Census	Pop.	Note	%±
1940	13		—
1950	14		7.7%
1960	78		457.1%
1970	38		−51.3%
1980	139		265.8%
1990	285		105.0%
2000	1,658		481.8%
2010	2,102		26.8%
2020	2,196		4.5%
U.S. Decennial Census:

Willow first appeared on the 1940 U.S. Census as the unincorporated village of "Willow Station." It next appeared in 1960 and in every successive census as Willow. It was made a census-designated place (CDP) in 1980.

=== 2020 census ===
As of the 2020 census, Willow had a population of 2,196. The median age was 55.3 years. 15.9% of residents were under the age of 18 and 26.4% of residents were 65 years of age or older. For every 100 females there were 113.0 males, and for every 100 females age 18 and over there were 112.9 males age 18 and over.

None of the residents lived in urban areas, as all lived in rural areas.

Racial composition as of the 2020 census
Race	Number	Percent
White	1,874	85.3%
Black or African American	17	0.8%
American Indian and Alaska Native	93	4.2%
Asian	23	1.0%
Native Hawaiian and Other Pacific Islander	1	0.0%
Some other race	18	0.8%
Two or more races	170	7.7%
Hispanic or Latino (of any race)	26	1.2%

There were 1,000 households in Willow, of which 15.2% had children under the age of 18 living in them. Of all households, 52.3% were married-couple households, 26.3% were households with a male householder and no spouse or partner present, and 14.1% were households with a female householder and no spouse or partner present. About 29.3% of all households were made up of individuals and 13.9% had someone living alone who was 65 years of age or older. There were 431 families in the CDP.

There were 2,228 housing units, of which 55.1% were vacant. The homeowner vacancy rate was 3.1% and the rental vacancy rate was 8.5%. The population density was 3.18 inhabitants per square mile (1.23/km^{2}), with 2,228 housing units at an average density of 3.23 per square mile (1.25/km^{2}).

=== 2010 census ===
At the 2010 census, there were 2,102 people, 893 households, and 572 families residing in the CDP. The population density was 3.0 inhabitants per square mile (1.2/km^{2}), with 1,912 housing units at an average density of 2.8 per square mile (1.1/km^{2}). The racial makeup was 1,908 (90.77%) White, 109 (5.19%) Native American, 17 (0.81%) Asian, two (0.1%) Pacific Islander, six (0.29%) from other races, and 60 (2.85%) from two or more races. 27 (1.28%) residents were Hispanic or Latino.

There were 893 households, of which 212 (23.74%) had children under the age of 18 living with them, 487 (54.54%) were married opposite-sex couples living together, 38 (4.26%) had a female householder with no husband present, 62 (6.94%) were unmarried opposite-sex couples, 4 (0.45%) were unmarried same-sex couples, and 321 (35.95%) were non-families. 257 (28.78%) of all households were made up of individuals, and 78 (8.73%) had someone living alone who was 65 years of age or older. The average household size was 2.34, and the average family size was 2.86.

There were 439 residents (20.9%) under the age of 18, 126 (6.0%) aged 18 to 24, 442 (21.03%) aged 25 to 44, 786 (37.39%) aged 45 to 64, and 309 (14.7%) who were 65 years of age or older. The median age was 46.4 years. For every 100 females, there were 114.5 males.

=== 2000 census ===
As of the census of 2000, there were 1,658 people, 654 households, and 438 families residing in the CDP. The population density was 2.4 inhabitants per square mile (0.93/km^{2}). There were 1,530 housing units at an average density of 2.2 per square mile (0.85/km^{2}). The racial makeup of the CDP was 92.40% White, 3.08% Native American, 0.24% Asian, 0.42% from other races, and 3.86% from two or more races. 1.27% of the population were Hispanic or Latino of any race.

There were 654 households, out of which 32.0% had children under the age of 18 living with them, 56.6% were married couples living together, 5.5% had a female householder with no husband present, and 33.0% were non-families. 25.8% of all households were made up of individuals, and 4.9% had someone living alone who was 65 years of age or older. The average household size was 2.54 and the average family size was 3.08.

In the CDP, 27.9% of residents were under the age of 18, 5.4% from 18 to 24, 27.9% from 25 to 44, 29.2% from 45 to 64, and 9.6% who were 65 years of age or older. The median age was 40 years. For every 100 females, there were 114.2 males. Of residents age 18 and over, there were 119.3 males for every 100 females.

The median income for a household in the CDP was $38,906, and the median income for a family was $41,944. Males had a median income of $42,188 versus $29,792 for females. The per capita income for the CDP was $22,323. About 15.3% of families and 22.1% of the population were below the poverty line, including 38.1% of those under age 18 and 4.6% of those age 65 or over.

== State Parks ==
A few miles north of Willow is the Alaska State Parks Willow Creek State Recreation Area, a 3,583 acres (1,450 ha) park which features a large campground and access to one of the busiest salmon fishing areas in the state. Other area parks include Nancy Lake State Recreation Area and the Montana Creek State Recreation Site, an 82 acres (33 ha) park with a campground. One end of the road to Hatcher Pass is in Willow. Willow lake has great Char fishing and a library on its shoreline.

== People ==
Due to its outlying location and access to trails, Willow has become a popular destination for a number of notable dog mushers. Iditarod Trail Sled Dog Race competitors DeeDee Jonrowe, Beverly Masek and Iditarod winner Dallas Seavey have established their residence and dog kennels in Willow. Masek also represented Willow and the surrounding area in the Alaska House of Representatives from 1995 to 2005. John Gourley, lead singer and guitarist of Grammy Award-winning American rock band "Portugal. The Man" was born in Willow, Alaska.
