= Martin Buser =

Swiss dog musher

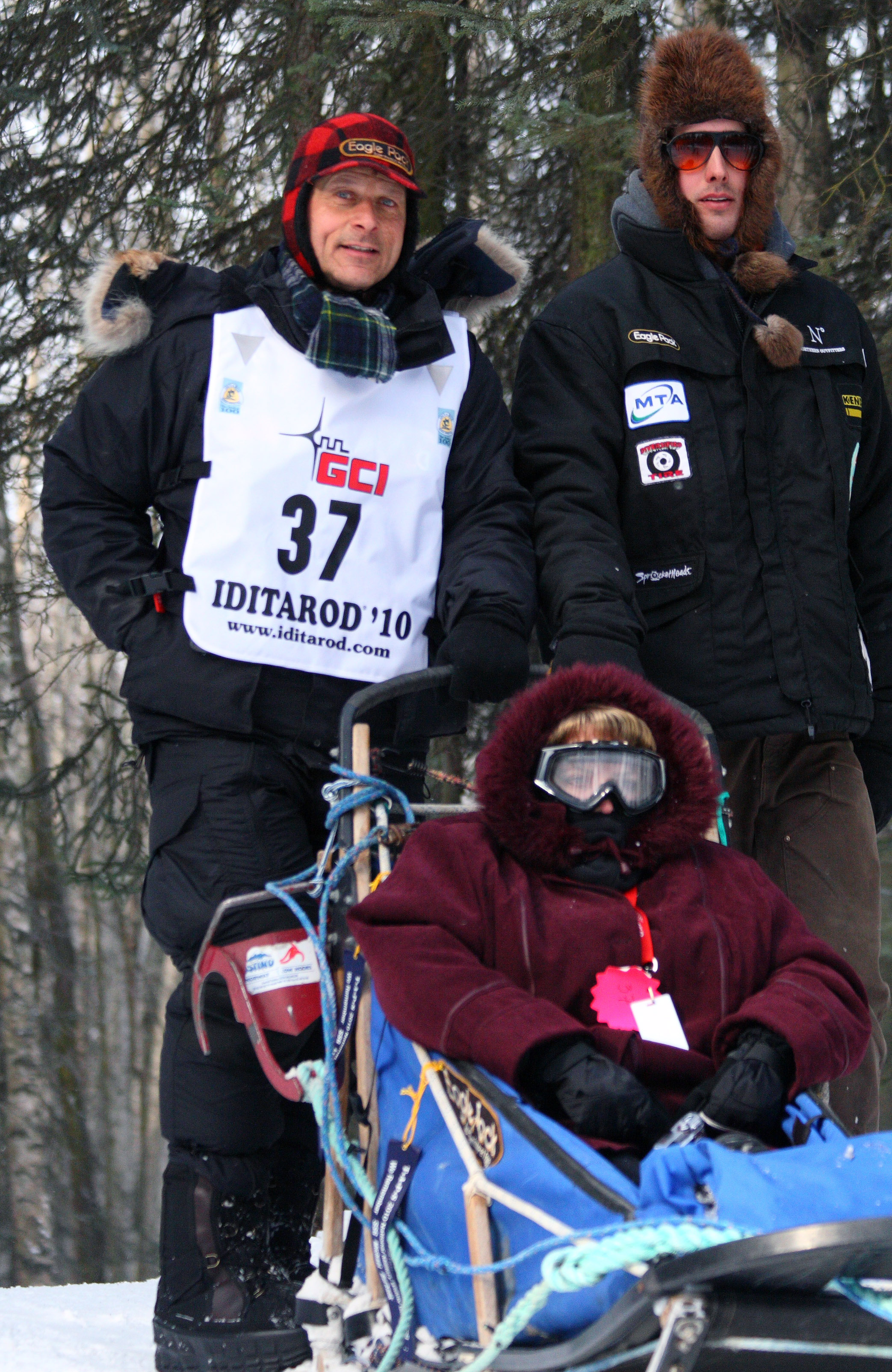
- Martin Buser during the ceremonial start of the 2010 Iditarod.
- Born: March 29, 1958 (age 67); Winterthur, Switzerland
- Occupation: Sled dog musher

Martin Buser (born March 29, 1958) is sled dog racing competitor.

Born in Winterthur, Switzerland, Buser began mushing at age seventeen in Switzerland. In 1979, he moved to Alaska to train and raise sled dogs full-time. His training operation, Happy Trails Kennels, is located in Big Lake, Alaska.

He entered his first Iditarod in 1980, and has run every race from 1986, to 2022. Buser has won the event four times, in 1992, 1994, 1997, and 2002. On sixteen occasions, he has finished among the top ten finishers. He ran the fastest finish time on the previous route which was a longer race than it is now. In 2002, the race started in Wasilla. Now it starts in Willow, making the race about 80 miles shorter. In 2002, his team completed the 80 mile longer race in 8 days, 22 hours, 46 minutes, and 2 seconds. He entered his first Yukon Quest in 2009 and finished in fourth place, earning him "Rookie of the Year." As of 2017, he has the most consecutive race finishes, 31. He was one of the mushers featured in a documentary about the 2008 Iditarod; in that same race, Martin's son Rohn competed for the first time.

His sense of humor and positive outlook have made him a fan favorite. In 2008, he caused quite a stir among fans worldwide when he accidentally gave his GPS unit to a pilot who was transporting dogs and equipment to and from a checkpoint, when the race was first introducing GPS tracking on the racers so fans could follow their paths live.

He talks in a highly exaggerated tone of voice to his dogs. Other top competitors in the Iditarod, like DeeDee Jonrowe and Aliy Zirkle have found this method to work well in communicating with their dogs.

== Controversy ==
Buser has come under scrutiny for Kuskokwim 300 race violations two years running. Most recently, Buser was caught taking shortcuts and accepting help in the care of his dogs in the 2016 Kuskokwim 300. While Buser denies intentionally straying from the course, he has been officially penalized by the Kusokwim 300 Race Committee causing him to place last.
