= List of Yukon Quest competitors =

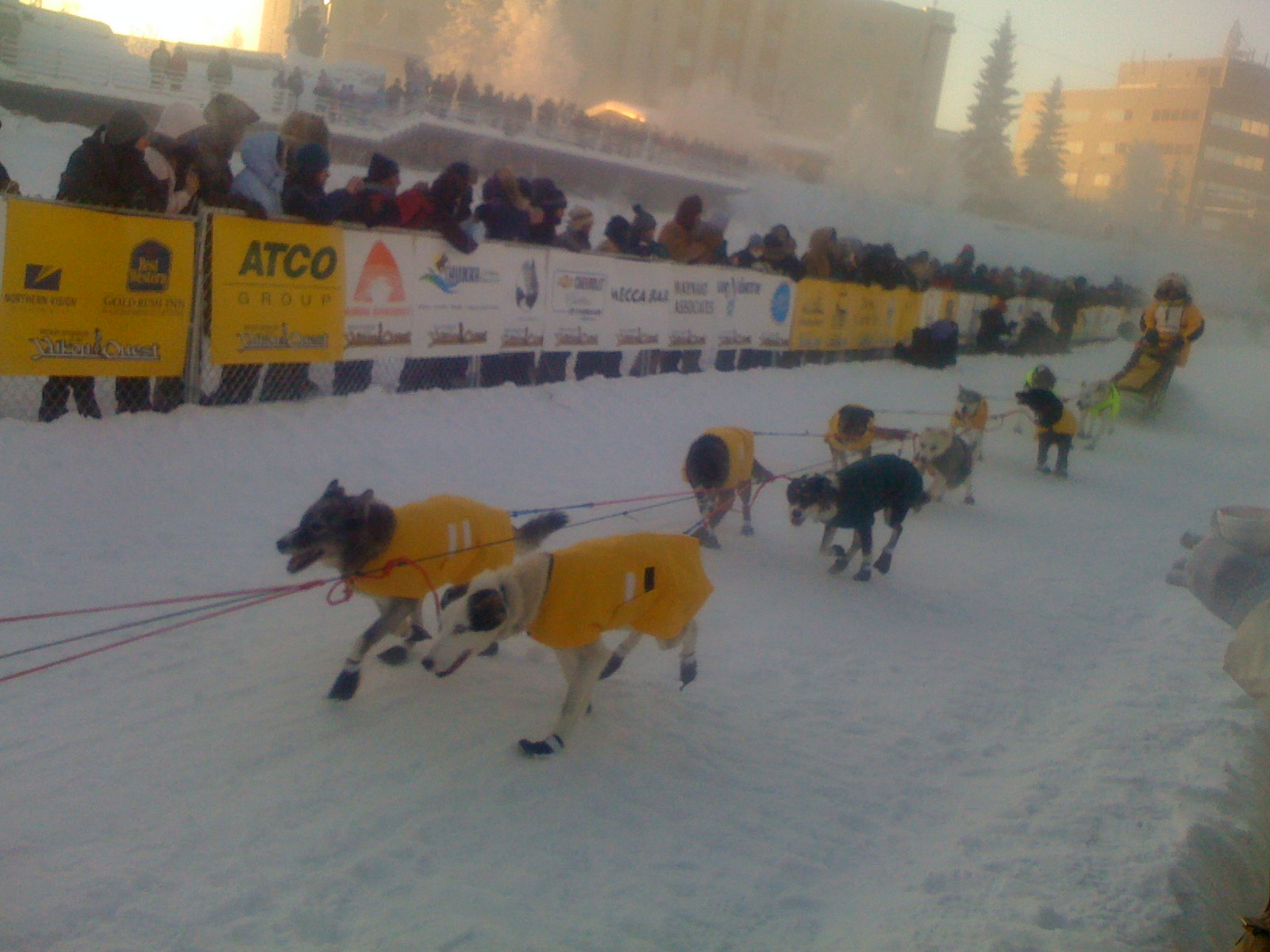
Didier Moggia was the first musher to start the 2008 Yukon Quest in Fairbanks, Alaska.

Three hundred and eighty-six people have participated in the Yukon Quest, an annual international 1,000-mile sled dog race between Fairbanks, Alaska and Whitehorse, Yukon. It has been called the "most difficult sled dog race in the world" and the "toughest race in the world". The race's route follows the Yukon River for much of its course and travels over four mountains: King Solomon's Dome, Eagle Summit, American Summit, and Rosebud Summit. Its length is equivalent to the distance between England and Africa, and the distance between some checkpoints is equivalent to the breadth of Ireland.

Yukon Quest attracts anywhere from 18 (in 2014) to 47 (in 1988 and 1989) mushers each year. Because of the competition's difficulty, about one-third of the entrants do not finish. Of the 776 entries from the race's inception in 1984 to 2007, 263 did not finish—a scratch rate of 33.9 percent. The racers have come from various professions: taxicab drivers, a swimming instructor, a coal miner, a tax assessor, a lawyer, fur trappers, journalists, and a car salesman, among others.

At the conclusion of the competition, several racers are recognized by special awards given for various feats performed on the trail. The most notable of these accomplishments is the championship award, given to the winner of the race. Accompanying this is the Golden Harness Award, given to the winner's two lead sled dogs. The next significant award is the Veterinarians Choice Award, which is given to the musher who maintains the best care of their dogs during the race, as voted by race veterinarians. Other awards include the Challenge of the North Award—given to the musher who "exemplifies the spirit of the Yukon Quest"—and the sportsmanship award, given to the most sportsmanlike competitor, as chosen by a vote of the mushers. Following the 2011 race, event organizers created the Silver Award to recognize musher Brent Sass for guiding two sled dog teams out of a blizzard atop American Summit. The Silver Award is not an annual award, and to date, Sass is its only recipient.

The Rookie of the Year Award is given to the highest-finishing musher who has never before competed in a Yukon Quest. The Dawson Award consists of four ounces of gold, and it is given to the first musher to reach Dawson City, the midpoint of the race, and complete the race. The final award is the Red Lantern, a $1,000 prize awarded to the last official finisher of that year's race. Two awards have been discontinued: the Kiwanis Award, given to the first musher to cross the Alaska-Yukon border, and the Mayor's Award, given to the Yukon Quest champion.

The latest Yukon Quest champion is Allen Moore, who finished the race in eight days, 14 hours and 21 minutes. Fort St. James, British Columbia musher Jerry Joinson won the 2014 Red Lantern Award by finishing the race in 13 days, 11 hours, and 1 minute. Joinson finished 30 minutes ahead of the final finisher but was assessed a time penalty for using a replacement sled. Rookie musher Matt Hall earned Rookie of the Year honors for his third-place finish. The 22-year-old from Two Rivers, Alaska was also chosen by his fellow competitors for the Veterinarian's Choice and Challenge of the North awards.

Race champion Allen Moore was the first musher to reach Dawson City and thus received $5,000 in gold. His lead dog, Quito, was awarded a golden harness. Race sponsor Northwestel donated $1,000 to a charity of Moore's choosing; Moore selected Special Olympics Yukon. Dawson City musher Brian Wilmshurst received the sportsmanship award for the 2014 race.

The 2011 purse was set at $150,000, but fewer than 15 mushers finished the race that year, meaning the money allotted for the final two prizes were distributed to each of the 13 mushers who finished. The purse peaked at $200,000 in 2007, and winner Lance Mackey took home $40,000. In 2014, the purse was $115,000, but only 11 mushers finished the race, fewer than the number of paying positions. Rather than distribute the extra money to the finishers, the race chose to roll over the unused prize money into the 2015 race. As a result, the 2015 Yukon Quest will have a purse of more than $127,000.

== Key ==
| S | Scratched | W | Withdrawn |
| † | Won the race. | * | Won the Dawson Award. |
| ^{@} | Won the Challenge of the North Award. | ^{#} | Named Rookie of the Year. |
| ^{$} | Won the Veterinarian's Choice Award. | ^{1} | Won Red Lantern Award. |
| ^{2} | Won Kiwanis Award. | ^{3} | Won Mayor's Award. |
| ^{4} | Won the Sportsmanship Award. | DQ | Disqualified. |

== Competitors ==
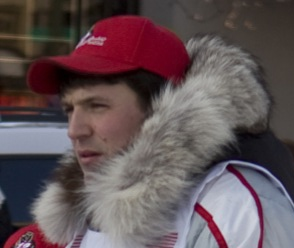
Ramy Brooks won the 1999 Yukon Quest.

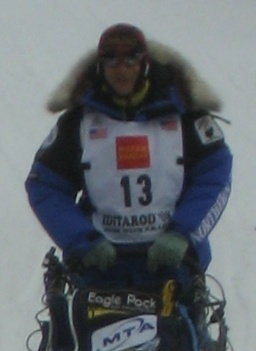
Martin Buser won the Iditarod four times, but has only raced in the Quest once.

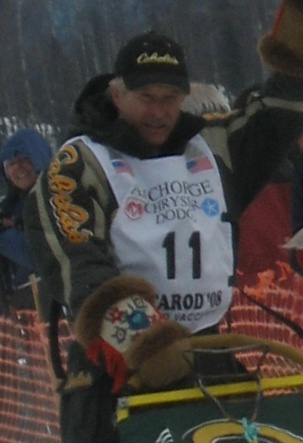
Jeff King won the 1989 Yukon Quest and finished second two times.

| Competitor | Hometown | Years entered | Finishing place | Time elapsed^{[a]} | Earnings^{b} |
|---|---|---|---|---|---|
| Ed Abrahamson | Kenai Peninsula, Alaska | 1997 | 15 | 15:13:34 | $1,500 |
| Ed Abrahamson | Kenai Peninsula, Alaska | 1999 | 17 | 14:02:22 | – |
| Ross Adam | Grande Prairie, Alberta | 1995 | 12 | 14:11:00 | – |
| Kiara Adams | Mount Lorne, Yukon | 2006 | S | – | – |
| Kiara Adams | Mount Lorne, Yukon | 2007 | S | – | – |
| Daryle Adkins | Trapper Creek, Alaska | 1984 | S | – | – |
| Ron Aldrich | Willow, Alaska | 1984 | 13 | 13:12:48 | $700 |
| Ron Aldrich | Willow, Alaska | 1990 | S | – | – |
| Diane Allen | Whitehorse, Yukon | 2002 | S | – | – |
| Suzan Amundsen | Two Rivers, Alaska | 1994 | 21 | 15:08:47 | – |
| Suzan Amundsen | Two Rivers, Alaska | 1995 | S | – | – |
| Suzan Amundsen | Two Rivers, Alaska | 1996 | 13 | 15:02:52 | $1,250 |
| Suzan Amundsen | Two Rivers, Alaska | 2002 | 24 | 14:09:40 | – |
| John Anderson | Willow, Alaska | 1989 | 25 | 15:03:19 | – |
| Ken Anderson | Fairbanks, Alaska | 2008^{#} | 2 | 10:12:29 | $25,000 |
| Ken Anderson | Fairbanks, Alaska | 2010 | 5 | 09:15:13 | $11,760 |
| Ken Anderson | Fairbanks, Alaska | 2011 | 3 | 10:14:24 | * |
| Ken Anderson | Fairbanks, Alaska | 2014 | 4 | 10:23:41 | $10,079 |
| Tony Andreonne | France | 1986 | 14 | 14:19:57 | $600 |
| George Aplustill | Fairbanks, Alaska | 1993 | S | – | – |
| George Aplustill | Fairbanks, Alaska | 1994 | S | – | – |
| Terry Asbury | Healy, Alaska | 1997 | S | – | – |
| Terry Asbury | Healy, Alaska | 2002 | S | – | – |
| Terry Asbury | Healy, Alaska | 2004 | S | – | – |
| Rick Atkinson | Bettles, Alaska | 1985 | 2 | 11:12:15 | $10,000 |
| Rick Atkinson | Bettles, Alaska | 1987 | 5 | 12:06:25 | $3,300 |
| Rick Atkinson | Bettles, Alaska | 1988 | 4 | 13:04:22 | $7,000 |
| Jodi Bailey | Chatanika, Alaska | 2011 | 7 | 12:06:51 | $8,925 |
| John Ballard | Salcha, Alaska | 1988 | 29 | 20:06:26 | – |
| Steve Barb | Healy, Alaska | 1989 | 24 | 14:19:07 | – |
| Dick Barnum | Fairbanks, Alaska | 1988 | S | – | – |
| Dick Barnum | Fairbanks, Alaska | 1989 | 26 | 15:04:41 | – |
| Cindy Barrand | Chalk River, Ontario | 2010 | 16 | 11:10:57 | – |
| John Barron | Sheep Creek, Alaska | 1994^{4} | 11 | 11:19:21 | $2,560 |
| Lavon Barve | Wasilla, Alaska | 1994^{#3} | 1^{†} | 10:22:44 | $20,000 |
| Bruno Baureis | Gakona, Alaska | 2000 | S | – | – |
| Bruno Baureis | Gakona, Alaska | 2002 | 21 | 14:00:34 | – |
| Bruno Baureis | Gakona, Alaska | 2005 | S | – | – |
| Stan Bearup | North Pole, Alaska | 1985 | 26 | 15:17:59 | – |
| Richie Beattie | Two Rivers, Alaska | 2006^{#} | 9 | 12:02:06 | $3,700 |
| Richie Beattie | Two Rivers, Alaska | 2007 | 16 | 13:00:42 | – |
| Benedikt Beisch | Nenana, Alaska | 2007 | 17 | 13:06:02 | – |
| Braden Bennett | Whitehorse, Yukon | 2002 | 20 | 13:23:53 | – |
| Jim Bennett | Fairbanks, Alaska | 1985 | 25 | 15:07:03 | – |
| Jim Bennett | Fairbanks, Alaska | 1988 | S | – | – |
| Tom Benson | Dubois, Wyoming | 2002 | 25 | 14:09:48 | – |
| Tom Benson | Dubois, Wyoming | 2004 | 20 | 14:04:09^{1} | – |
| Tom Benson | Dubois, Wyoming | 2007 | 19 | 13:14:01 | – |
| Dyan Bergen | Yellowknife, Northwest Territories | 2013 | 20 | 13:06:15^{1} | – |
| Kristy Berington | Kasilof, Alaska | 2012 | 9 | 10:18:33^{$} | |
| Jake Berkowitz | Big Lake, Alaska | 2012^{#} | 4 | 10:00:22 | $13,380 |
| Jake Berkowitz | Big Lake, Alaska | 2013 | 4 | 09:08:00 | $8,920 |
| Jack Berry | Homer, Alaska | 1992 | 13 | 14:05:40 | $1,317 |
| Jack Berry | Homer, Alaska | 1999^{4} | 8 | 12:09:54 | $4,200 |
| Jack Berry | Homer, Alaska | 2000 | 5 | 11:04:06 | $8,000* |
| Jack Berry | Homer, Alaska | 2001 | S | – | – |
| Jack Berry | Homer, Alaska | 2002 | S | – | – |
| Jack Berry | Homer, Alaska | 2004 | S | – | – |
| Kirsten Bey | Nome, Alaska | 2001 | S | – | – |
| Deborah Bicknell | Auke Bay, Alaska | 2000 | 21 | 15:05:50^{1} | – |
| Deborah Bicknell | Auke Bay, Alaska | 2002 | S | – | – |
| Deborah Bicknell | Auke Bay, Alaska | 2003 | S | – | – |
| Tony Blanford | Fairbanks, Alaska | 1998 | S | – | – |
| Tony Blanford | Fairbanks, Alaska | 1999 | 19 | 14:02:38 | – |
| Tony Blanford | Fairbanks, Alaska | 2000 | 15 | 12:09:35 | $1,500 |
| Marc Boily | Nome, Alaska | 1987 | 9 | 13:07:09 | $1,200 |
| Kyla Boivin | Whitehorse, Yukon | 2001 | 18 | 14:20:18 | – |
| Kyla Boivin | Whitehorse, Yukon | 2003 | 15 | 13:06:30 | $1,500 |
| Kyla Boivin | Whitehorse, Yukon | 2004 | S | – | – |
| Kyla Boivin | Whitehorse, Yukon | 2006 | S | – | – |
| Kyla Boivin | Whitehorse, Yukon | 2007 | 20 | 14:07:50 | – |
| Kyla Boivin | Whitehorse, Yukon | 2008 | 15 | 14:04:17^{1} | $4,000 |
| Kyla Boivin | Whitehorse, Yukon | 2009 | S | – | – |
| Ed Borden | Kenai, Alaska | 1986 | S | – | – |
| Charlie Boulding | Manley, Alaska | 1989 | 11 | 13:04:52 | $1,550 |
| Charlie Boulding | Manley, Alaska | 1990 | 10 | 12:19:36 | $1,750 |
| Charlie Boulding | Manley, Alaska | 1991 | 1^{†} | 10:21:12 | $25,000 |
| Charlie Boulding | Manley, Alaska | 1992 | 3 | 12:01:38 | $15,202 |
| Charlie Boulding | Manley, Alaska | 1993^{3} | 1^{†} | 10:19:09^{2} | $25,000* |
| Daniel Bourassa | Lanoraie, Quebec | 1991 | S | – | – |
| Daniel Bourassa | Lanoraie, Quebec | 2005 | S | – | – |
| Jeff Bouton | Fairbanks, Alaska | 1992 | 17 | 16:01:00 | $800 |
| Jeff Bouton | Fairbanks, Alaska | 1993 | S | – | – |
| Doug Bowers | Nenana, Alaska | 1991 | 12 | 12:00:34 | $1,500 |
| Pete Bowers | Fairbanks, Alaska | 1985 | 24 | 15:02:32 | – |
| Rod Boyce | Two Rivers, Alaska | 2004 | S | – | – |
| Rod Boyce | Two Rivers, Alaska | 2006 | S | – | – |
| Maren Bradley | Carcross, Yukon | 2012 | S | – | – |
| Trevor Braun | Mendenhall, Yukon | 1997 | 16 | 15:13:38 | – |
| Trevor Braun | Mendenhall, Yukon | 2004 | S | – | – |
| Jim Bridges | Wasilla, Alaska | 1985 | 28 | 18:14:17^{1} | – |
| Jim Bridges | Wasilla, Alaska | 1986 | S | – | – |
| Bob Bright | Watersmeet, Michigan | 1988 | S | – | – |
| Bob Bright | Watersmeet, Michigan | 1989 | S | – | – |
| Jean-denis Britten | Whitehorse, Yukon | 2008 | 9 | 12:04:57 | $8,000 |
| Jean-denis Britten | Whitehorse, Yukon | 2009 | S | – | – |
| Jean-denis Britten | Whitehorse, Yukon | 2014 | S | – | – |
| Shannon Brockman | Nenana, Alaska | 2002^{#} | 10 | 11:23:36 | $3,300 |
| Ramy Brooks | Fairbanks, Alaska | 1993 | 15 | 12:21:50 | $2,400 |
| Ramy Brooks | Fairbanks, Alaska | 1999^{3} | 1^{†} | 11:08:27^{2} | $30,000* |
| Eric Buetow | Two Rivers, Alaska | 1985 | 15 | 12:16:50 | – |
| Aaron Burmeister | Nenana, Alaska | 2007^{#} | 5 | 11:01:10 | $12,500 |
| Martin Buser | Big Lake, Alaska | 2009^{#} | 4 | 10:09:40 | $13,500 |
| Eric Butcher | Fairbanks, Alaska | 2004 | 15 | 13:13:17 | $1,500 |
| Eric Butcher | Fairbanks, Alaska | 2006 | S | – | – |
| Peter Butteri | Tok, Alaska | 1989 | 31 | 16:23:34^{1} | – |
| Peter Butteri | Tok, Alaska | 1990 | S | – | – |
| Peter Butteri | Tok, Alaska | 1991 | 16 | 13:07:35 | $850 |
| Peter Butteri | Tok, Alaska | 1992 | 7 | 12:14:42 | $3,040 |
| Peter Butteri | Tok, Alaska | 1993 | S | – | – |
| Peter Butteri | Tok, Alaska | 1994 | 5 | 11:03:27 | $6,400 |
| Peter Butteri | Tok, Alaska | 1996 | 7 | 13:05:56 | $4,000 |
| Peter Butteri | Tok, Alaska | 1999 | 3 | 11:18:41 | $18,000 |
| Peter Butteri | Tok, Alaska | 2000 | 4 | 11:03:42 | $12,000 |
| Peter Butteri | Tok, Alaska | 2002 | 2 | 11:05:45^{2} | $24,000* |
| Russ Bybee | Willow, Alaska | 2006 | S | – | – |
| Russ Bybee | Willow, Alaska | 2007 | 13 | 12:04:46 | $5,000 |
| Russ Bybee | Willow, Alaska | 2009 | S | – | – |
| Clifton Cadzow | Fort Yukon, Alaska | 1988 | S | – | – |
| Jay Cadzow | Fort Yukon, Alaska | 1993^{#} | 5 | 11:07:11^{$} | $8,000 |
| Jay Cadzow | Fort Yukon, Alaska | 1994 | S | – | – |
| Jay Cadzow | Fort Yukon, Alaska | 1995^{4} | 3 | 10:18:39 | $8,000 |
| Jay Cadzow | Fort Yukon, Alaska | 1997 | S | – | – |
| Josh Cadzow | Fort Yukon, Alaska | 2009 | S | – | – |
| Josh Cadzow | Fort Yukon, Alaska | 2010 | 7^{#} | 10:00:18^{$} | $8,925 |
| Josh Cadzow | Fort Yukon, Alaska | 2011 | S | – | – |
| Scott Cameron | Palmer, Alaska | 1989 | 28 | 15:17:21 | – |
| Adolphus Capot-Blanc | Fort Nelson, British Columbia | 1986 | 18 | 15:01:50 | – |
| Adolphus Capot-Blanc | Fort Nelson, British Columbia | 1988 | S | – | – |
| Adolphus Capot-Blanc | Fort Nelson, British Columbia | 1997 | 12 | 14:01:41 | – |
| Dave Carroll | Willow, Alaska | 1990 | S | – | – |
| George Carroll | Fairbanks, Alaska | 2000 | 18 | 14:06:51 | – |
| George Carroll | Fairbanks, Alaska | 2002 | S | – | – |
| Larry Carroll | Willow, Alaska | 1998 | 15 | 13:00:11 | $1,500 |
| Larry Carroll | Willow, Alaska | 1999 | 7 | 12:07:26 | $5,000 |
| Larry Carroll | Willow, Alaska | 2000 | 12 | 11:23:27 | $2,500 |
| Larry Carroll | Willow, Alaska | 2002 | S | – | – |
| Normand Casavant | Atlin, British Columbia | 2009 | 10 | 11:15:02 | $6,000 |
| Normand Casavant | Atlin, British Columbia | 2010 | 10 | 10:09:53 | $5,670 |
| Normand Casavant | Atlin, British Columbia | 2013 | 7 | 10:02:47^{$} | $5,950 |
| Normand Casavant | Atlin, British Columbia | 2014 | S | – | – |
| Jeninne Cathers | Whitehorse, Yukon | 1989 | 27 | 15:13:13 | – |
| Jeninne Cathers | Whitehorse, Yukon | 1990 | 18 | 14:01:41 | – |
| Jeninne Cathers | Whitehorse, Yukon | 1991 | S | – | – |
| Jeninne Cathers | Whitehorse, Yukon | 1992 | 15 | 14:16:34 | $912 |
| Jeninne Cathers | Whitehorse, Yukon | 1993 | 22 | 13:07:28 | – |
| Jeninne Cathers | Whitehorse, Yukon | 1996 | 10 | 14:01:40 | $2,500 |
| Ned Cathers | Whitehorse, Yukon | 1988 | 19 | 15:09:42 | – |
| Ned Cathers | Whitehorse, Yukon | 1989 | 15 | 13:11:15 | $750 |
| Ned Cathers | Whitehorse, Yukon | 1990 | 11 | 12:20:12 | $1,550 |
| Ned Cathers | Whitehorse, Yukon | 1991 | S | – | – |
| Ned Cathers | Whitehorse, Yukon | 1992 | 14 | 14:07:40 | $1,114 |
| Ned Cathers | Whitehorse, Yukon | 1993 | 14 | 12:19:56 | $2,600 |
| Ned Cathers | Whitehorse, Yukon | 1994 | S | – | – |
| Ned Cathers | Whitehorse, Yukon | 1995 | S | – | – |
| Ned Cathers | Whitehorse, Yukon | 1997 | 8 | 13:02:28^{$} | $4,200 |
| Ned Cathers | Whitehorse, Yukon | 1998 | S | – | – |
| Lena Charley | Gakona, Alaska | 1985 | S | – | – |
| Bill Chisholm | Two Rivers, Alaska | 1993 | 9 | 11:19:23 | $3,700 |
| Arthur Church | Willow, Alaska | 1986 | S | – | – |
| Murray Clayton | Haines, Alaska | 1984 | 17 | 14:17:23 | – |
| Murray Clayton | Haines, Alaska | 1985 | 13 | 12:15:39 | $700 |
| Christian Clerc | East Wenatchee, Washington | 2000 | S | – | – |
| Jennifer Cochran | Fairbanks, Alaska | 2004 | 16 | 13:13:59 | – |
| Jennifer Cochran | Fairbanks, Alaska | 2006 | S | – | – |
| Phil Cole | Fairbanks, Alaska | 1990 | S | – | – |
| Julie Collins | Lake Minchumina, Alaska | 1985 | 20 | 13:18:50 | $750 |
| George Cook III | Ashland, New Hampshire | 1992 | 18 | 16:03:19^{1} | – |
| Rob Cooke | Edmundston, New Brunswick | 2013 | 18 | 11:17:47 | – |
| Bruce Cosgrove | Fairbanks, Alaska | 1994 | S | – | – |
| Bill Cotter | Nenana, Alaska | 1984 | 3 | 12:05:40 | $5,000 |
| Bill Cotter | Nenana, Alaska | 1985 | 5 | 11:15:23 | $4,400 |
| Bill Cotter | Nenana, Alaska | 1986 | 6 | 14:11:50 | $2,400 |
| Bill Cotter | Nenana, Alaska | 1987 | 1^{†} | 12:04:34 | $15,000 |
| Bill Cotter | Nenana, Alaska | 2008 | 14 | 13:20:40 | $4,500 |
| Glen Craig | Nenana, Alaska | 1985 | S | – | – |
| Jeff Currey | Fairbanks, Alaska | 1991 | S | – | – |
| Jeff Currey | Fairbanks, Alaska | 1993 | 25 | 17:02:37^{1} | – |
| Jeff Currey | Fairbanks, Alaska | 1997 | S | – | – |
| Wayne Curtis | Wasilla, Alaska | 1999 | 18 | 14:02:22 | – |
| David Dalton | Healy, Alaska | 1988 | 21 | 15:23:01 | – |
| David Dalton | Healy, Alaska | 1990 | 16 | 13:16:03 | – |
| David Dalton | Healy, Alaska | 1991 | 10 | 11:21:00 | $1,900 |
| David Dalton | Healy, Alaska | 1992 | S | – | – |
| David Dalton | Healy, Alaska | 1993 | S | – | – |
| David Dalton | Healy, Alaska | 1994 | 18 | 12:20:50 | $1,680 |
| David Dalton | Healy, Alaska | 1996 | 14 | 15:06:31 | $1,000 |
| David Dalton | Healy, Alaska | 1997 | 7 | 12:23:32 | $5,000 |
| David Dalton | Healy, Alaska | 1998 | 11 | 12:06:44 | $2,900 |
| David Dalton | Healy, Alaska | 1999 | 14 | 13:04:51 | $1,800 |
| David Dalton | Healy, Alaska | 2000 | S | – | – |
| David Dalton | Healy, Alaska | 2001 | 13 | 12:16:45 | $2,100 |
| David Dalton | Healy, Alaska | 2002 | S | – | – |
| David Dalton | Healy, Alaska | 2004 | 3 | 11:12:48^{$} | $18,000 |
| David Dalton | Healy, Alaska | 2005 | 4 | 11:02:21 | $12,000 |
| David Dalton | Healy, Alaska | 2006 | 4 | 10:20:08 | $12,000 |
| David Dalton | Healy, Alaska | 2007 | 10 | 11:14:02 | $6,500 |
| David Dalton | Healy, Alaska | 2008 | 3 | 11:09:35 | $20,000 |
| David Dalton | Healy, Alaska | 2009 | S | – | – |
| David Dalton | Healy, Alaska | 2010 | 14 | 11:00:40 | $3,645 |
| David Dalton | Healy, Alaska | 2011 | 9 | 12:10:07 | $6,480 |
| David Dalton | Healy, Alaska | 2012 | 10 | 11:03:18 | $5,670 |
| David Dalton | Healy, Alaska | 2013 | 12 | 11:03:18 | $3,240 |
| David Dalton | Healy, Alaska | 2014 | S | – | – |
| Dario Daniels | Fairbanks, Alaska | 2001 | S | – | – |
| Katie Davis | Olney, Montana | 2010 | 20 | 12:11:52 | – |
| Hank DeBruin | Haliburton, Ontario | 2011 | 13 | 13:10:54 | – |
| Hank DeBruin | Haliburton, Ontario | 2014 | 8 | 12:18:58 | $5,492 |
| Sam Deltour | Belgium | 2010 | 11 | 10:13:54 | $5,265 |
| Lauralee DeLuca | Cantwell, Alaska | 1993 | 21 | 13:06:52 | – |
| Lauralee DeLuca | Cantwell, Alaska | 1994 | S | – | – |
| Bart De Marie | Christopher Lake, Saskatchewan | 2010 | 17 | 12:00:35 | – |
| Allen Dennis | Salcha, Alaska | 1987 | 21 | 15:15:17^{1} | – |
| Allen Dennis | Salcha, Alaska | 1988 | S | – | – |
| Allen Dennis | Salcha, Alaska | 1993 | S | – | – |
| Allen Dennis | Salcha, Alaska | 2011 | S | – | – |
| Dolif Dieter | Two Rivers, Alaska | 1996 | S | – | – |
| Dolif Dieter | Two Rivers, Alaska | 1998 | S | – | – |
| Dolif Dieter | Two Rivers, Alaska | 2000 | S | – | – |
| Don Donaldson | Delta Junction, Alaska | 1987 | 19 | 15:08:22 | – |
| Don Donaldson | Delta Junction, Alaska | 1988 | S | – | – |
| Patricia Doval | College, Alaska | 1985 | 18 | 13:16:10 | – |
| Paige Drobny | Fairbanks, Alaska | 2012^{4} | 14 | 11:21:17 | $3,645 |
| Ty Duggar | Nenana, Alaska | 1987 | S | – | – |
| Heath Duncan | Soldotna, Alaska | 1989 | 19 | 14:06:27 | – |
| Rick Dunlap | Fairbanks, Alaska | 1985 | 12 | 12:12:06 | $800 |
| Kyla Durham | Dawson City, Yukon | 2011 | 11 | 13:01:53 | $5,265 |
| Kyla Durham | Dawson City, Yukon | 2012 | 11 | 11:07:46 | $5,265 |
| Esa Ekdahl | Whitehorse, Yukon | 1990 | 26 | 16:11:03^{1} | – |
| Mark Elliott | Dawson City, Yukon | 1988 | 13 | 14:13:31 | $1,150 |
| Mark Elliott | Dawson City, Yukon | 1990 | S | – | – |
| Mike Ellis | Rumney, New Hampshire | 2008 | 11 | 12:09:58 | $6,500 |
| Mike Ellis | Rumney, New Hampshire | 2009 | S | – | – |
| Mike Ellis | Rumney, New Hampshire | 2010 | 13 | 10:20:47 | $4,050 |
| Mike Ellis | Rumney, New Hampshire | 2011^{4} | 8 | 12:09:59^{$} | $7,290 |
| Mike Ellis | Rumney, New Hampshire | 2012 | S | – | – |
| Mike Ellis | Rumney, New Hampshire | 2014 | S | – | – |
| Andy Elsberg | Fairbanks, Alaska | 2003 | 11 | 12:06:37 | $2,900 |
| Joni Elomaa | Finland | 1997 | DQ | – | – |
| Barry Emmett | Fairbanks, Alaska | 1994 | 23 | 17:22:35^{$} | – |
| Bob English | Whitehorse, Yukon | 1984 | S | – | – |
| Ernest Erick | Venetie, Alaska | 1994 | S | – | – |
| Nick Ericson | Fairbanks, Alaska | 1984 | 19 | 15:08:11 | – |
| Nick Ericson | Fairbanks, Alaska | 1985 | 17 | 12:23:07 | – |
| Nick Ericson | Fairbanks, Alaska | 1989 | 12 | 13:05:40 | $1,350 |
| Julie Estey | Fairbanks, Alaska | 2008 | S | – | – |
| Nikolay Ettyne | Russia | 2012 | S | – | – |
| Matthew Failor | Big Lake, Alaska | 2013 | 19 | 12:06:47 | – |
| Carrie Farr | Tanana, Alaska | 1999^{#} | 13 | 13:04:21 | $2,100 |
| Carrie Farr | Tanana, Alaska | 2000 | 8 | 12:10:19 | $4,200 |
| Carrie Farr | Tanana, Alaska | 2002 | 9 | 11:22:49 | $3,700 |
| Jeff Fisher | Cantwell, Alaska | 1988 | 25 | 17:14:13 | – |
| Jeff Fisher | Cantwell, Alaska | 1989 | 29 | 15:17:49 | – |
| Charlotte Fitzhugh | College, Alaska | 1989 | S | – | – |
| Peter Fleck | Salisbury, England | 2010 | 18 | 12:02:13 | |
| Bill Fliris | Tanana, Alaska | 1986 | 22 | 16:06:06 | – |
| Ed Foran | Nenana, Alaska | 1986 | 7 | 14:11:52 | $1,900 |
| Linda Forsberg | Denali Park, Alaska | 1989 | 8 | 13:03:06 | $2,250 |
| Linda Forsberg | Denali Park, Alaska | 1990 | 5 | 12:11:16 | $5,000 |
| Linda Forsberg | Denali Park, Alaska | 1991 | 5 | 11:11:40 | $6,500 |
| Linda Forsberg | Denali Park, Alaska | 1992 | 4 | 12:01:45^{$} | $10,135 |
| Linda Forsberg | Denali Park, Alaska | 1993 | 4 | 10:23:11 | $10,000 |
| Linda Forsberg | Denali Park, Alaska | 1994 | 3 | 11:01:33 | $12,000 |
| Will Forsberg | Denali Park, Alaska | 1990 | 9 | 12:18:30 | $1,950 |
| Will Forsberg | Denali Park, Alaska | 1991 | S | – | – |
| Agata Franczak | Dawson City, Yukon | 2004 | 17 | 13:14:32 | – |
| Blake Freking | Finland, Minnesota | 2005 | 12 | 12:05:03^{1} | $2,500 |
| Connie Frerichs | Delta Junction, Alaska | 1985 | 19 | 13:17:11 | – |
| Connie Frerichs | Delta Junction, Alaska | 1986 | S | – | – |
| Connie Frerichs | Delta Junction, Alaska | 1987 | 18 | 12:03:57 | – |
| Connie Frerichs | Delta Junction, Alaska | 1990 | 23 | 15:22:28 | – |
| Connie Frerichs | Delta Junction, Alaska | 1991 | 20 | 14:15:29 | $650 |
| Connie Frerichs | Delta Junction, Alaska | 1992 | S | – | – |
| Connie Frerichs | Delta Junction, Alaska | 1993 | S | – | – |
| Connie Frerichs | Delta Junction, Alaska | 1995 | S | – | – |
| Connie Frerichs | Delta Junction, Alaska | 1997 | S | – | – |
| Connie Frerichs | Delta Junction, Alaska | 1999 | S | – | – |
| Connie Frerichs | Delta Junction, Alaska | 2001 | S | – | – |
| Connie Frerichs | Delta Junction, Alaska | 2002 | S | – | – |
| Terry Freirichs | Delta Junction, Alaska | 1990 | 21 | 15:22:02 | – |
| Joran Freeman | Two Rivers, Alaska | 2001^{#} | 4^{@} | 11:22:10 | $12,000 |
| Joran Freeman | Two Rivers, Alaska | 2002 | S | – | – |
| Marcelle Fressineau | Matawin, Quebec | 2002 | S | – | – |
| Marcelle Fressineau | Matawin, Quebec | 2005 | S | – | – |
| Marcelle Fressineau | Matawin, Quebec | 2012 | 18 | 15:06:38 | – |
| Keizo Funatsu | Japan | 1997^{#} | 5 | 12:16:12 | $8,000 |
| Keizo Funatsu | Japan | 1998 | 8 | 12:04:53 | $4,200 |
| Sylvia Furtwaengler | Argenbuhl, Germany | 2003 | 16 | 13:06:31 | – |
| Frank Ganley | Fairbanks, Alaska | 1985 | 22 | 14:07:43 | – |
| Frank Ganley | Fairbanks, Alaska | 1986 | 19 | 15:03:49 | – |
| Frank Ganley | Fairbanks, Alaska | 1988 | 15 | 14:17:09 | $750 |
| Joe Garnie | Willow, Alaska | 1994 | 10 | 11:19:20 | $2,720 |
| Hans Gatt | Atlin, British Columbia | 1993 | 7 | 11:11:40 | $5,000 |
| Hans Gatt | Atlin, British Columbia | 2002 | 1^{†} | 11:04:22 | $30,000 |
| Hans Gatt | Atlin, British Columbia | 2003 | 1^{†} | 10:16:28^{2} | $30,000* |
| Hans Gatt | Atlin, British Columbia | 2004 | 1^{†} | 10:18:54 | $30,000* |
| Hans Gatt | Atlin, British Columbia | 2006 | 2 | 10:08:59 | $24,000 |
| Hans Gatt | Atlin, British Columbia | 2007 | 2 | 10:09:19 | $30,000 |
| Hans Gatt | Atlin, British Columbia | 2009 | S | – | – |
| Hans Gatt | Atlin, British Columbia | 2010 | 1^{†} | 9:00:26* | $28,395 |
| Hans Gatt | Atlin, British Columbia | 2011 | S | – | – |
| Charles Gauthier | Faro, Yukon | 1989 | 30 | 16:01:20 | – |
| Don Glassburn | Central, Alaska | 1984 | 18 | 14:23:55 | – |
| Don Glassburn | Central, Alaska | 1986^{4} | 15 | 14:20:21 | $500 |
| Don Glassburn | Central, Alaska | 1987 | S | – | – |
| Paul Geoffrion | Whitehorse, Yukon | 2003 | 18 | 14:20:30^{1} | – |
| Paul Geoffrion | Whitehorse, Yukon | 2004 | S | – | – |
| Paul Geoffrion | Whitehorse, Yukon | 2006 | S | – | – |
| Paul Geoffrion | Whitehorse, Yukon | 2008 | S | – | – |
| Jon Gleason | Fairbanks, Alaska | 1985 | 11 | 12:00:15 | $900 |
| Jon Gleason | Fairbanks, Alaska | 1987 | S | – | – |
| Jon Gleason | Fairbanks, Alaska | 1988 | S | – | – |
| John Gourley | Healy, Alaska | 1992 | 9 | 13:10:40 | $2,128 |
| John Gourley | Healy, Alaska | 1993^{4} | 13 | 12:14:02 | $2,800 |
| Robert Grawehr | Whitehorse, Yukon | 1989 | S | – | – |
| Kelley Griffin | Wasilla, Alaska | 2002 | 17 | 13:01:27 | – |
| Kelley Griffin | Wasilla, Alaska | 2003 | 13 | 12:23:26 | $2,100 |
| Kelley Griffin | Wasilla, Alaska | 2004 | 11 | 12:08:39 | $2,900 |
| Kelley Griffin | Wasilla, Alaska | 2005 | S | – | – |
| Kelley Griffin | Wasilla, Alaska | 2006 | 7 | 11:07:54 | $5,000 |
| Kelley Griffin | Wasilla, Alaska | 2007 | 14 | 12:08:01 | $4,500 |
| Kelley Griffin | Wasilla, Alaska | 2008^{4} | 6 | 11:21:15 | $13,000 |
| Kelley Griffin | Wasilla, Alaska | 2010 | 15 | 12:17:47 | $3,240 |
| Kelley Griffin | Wasilla, Alaska | 2011 | 5^{@} | 11:03:02 | |
| Doug Grilliot | Willow, Alaska | 2001 | 16 | 14:08:16 | – |
| Doug Grilliot | Willow, Alaska | 2002 | 18 | 13:07:03 | – |
| Mark Grober | Nenana, Alaska | 1987 | DQ | – | – |
| Larry Grout | Fairbanks, Alaska | 1987 | S | – | – |
| Larry Grout | Fairbanks, Alaska | 1990 | S | – | – |
| Larry Grout | Fairbanks, Alaska | 1992 | S | – | – |
| Larry Grout | Fairbanks, Alaska | 1993 | 20 | 13:06:34 | $1,800 |
| Gus Guenther | Clam Gulch, Alaska | 2012 | 13 | 11:20:57 | $4,050 |
| Cor Guimond | Cassiar Creek, Yukon | 1986 | 21 | 15:23:27 | – |
| Cor Guimond | Cassiar Creek, Yukon | 1991 | 17 | 13:09:45 | $800 |
| Cor Guimond | Cassiar Creek, Yukon | 1994 | 7^{@} | 11:09:33 | $4,000 |
| Cor Guimond | Cassiar Creek, Yukon | 1995 | 4 | 10:22:37 | $4,000 |
| Cor Guimond | Cassiar Creek, Yukon | 1998 | S | – | – |
| Cor Guimond | Cassiar Creek, Yukon | 2001^{4} | 11 | 12:14:46 | $2,900 |
| Cor Guimond | Cassiar Creek, Yukon | 2008 | S | – | – |
| Dean Gulden | Grand Marais, Minnesota | 1994 | S | – | – |
| Rusty Hagan | North Pole, Alaska | 1998^{4} | 19 | 14:13:48 | – |
| Rusty Hagan | North Pole, Alaska | 2000^{4} | 14 | 12:03:04 | $1,800 |
| Henry Hahn III | Two Rivers, Alaska | 1995 | S | – | – |
| Matt Hall | Eagle, Alaska | 2014^{#} | 3^{@} | 10:05:09^{$} | $12,215 |
| Wayne Hall | Eagle, Alaska | 2002 | 26^{@} | 14:10:30^{1} | – |
| Wayne Hall | Eagle, Alaska | 2006^{4} | 10 | 12:18:22 | $4,000 |
| Wayne Hall | Eagle, Alaska | 2009 | 15 | 12:15:09 | $3,000 |
| William Hanes | Kasilof, Alaska | 2007 | 12 | 12:00:51 | $5,500 |
| Vern Halter | Trapper Creek, Alaska | 1988 | 11 | 14:03:28 | $1,550 |
| Vern Halter | Trapper Creek, Alaska | 1989 | 2 | 11:21:11 | $15,000 |
| Vern Halter | Trapper Creek, Alaska | 1990 | 1^{†} | 11:17:09 | $20,000 |
| Vern Halter | Trapper Creek, Alaska | 1991 | 6 | 11:12:06 | $4,000 |
| Ty Halvorson | North Pole, Alaska | 1988 | 30 | 20:09:16^{1} | – |
| Larry Hand | Copper Center, Alaska | 1987 | DQ | – | – |
| Doug Harris | Whitehorse, Yukon | 1996 | 6^{@} | 13:04:56 | $5,000 |
| Doug Harris | Whitehorse, Yukon | 1998 | 10 | 12:06:33 | $3,300 |
| Steve Haver | Fairbanks, Alaska | 1988 | S | – | – |
| Jack Hayden | Lake Minchumina, Alaska | 1984 | 8 | 12:22:40 | $1,500 |
| Jack Hayden | Lake Minchumina, Alaska | 1985 | 10 | 12:06:06 | $1,000 |
| Richard Hayden | Fort Yukon, Alaska | 1985 | S | – | – |
| Jim Hendrick | Denali Park, Alaska | 1991 | 21 | 15:05:59 | – |
| Jim Hendrick | Denali Park, Alaska | 1992 | S | – | – |
| Jim Hendrick | Denali Park, Alaska | 1993 | 18 | 13:05:50 | $2,100 |
| Jim Hendrick | Denali Park, Alaska | 1994 | S | – | – |
| Jim Hendrick | Denali Park, Alaska | 1995 | 10 | 13:01:56 | $1,000 |
| Jim Hendrick | Denali Park, Alaska | 1997 | 13 | 14:09:02 | $2,100 |
| Jim Hendrick | Denali Park, Alaska | 1998 | S | – | – |
| Jim Hendrick | Denali Park, Alaska | 1999 | 12 | 13:04:01 | $2,500 |
| Jim Hendrick | Denali Park, Alaska | 2000 | 8 | 11:18:59 | $4,200 |
| Jim Hendrick | Denali Park, Alaska | 2001 | 12 | 12:15:20 | $2,500 |
| Jim Hendrick | Denali Park, Alaska | 2002^{4} | 15 | 12:20:20 | $1,500 |
| Jim Hendrick | Denali Park, Alaska | 2003 | S | – | – |
| Trent Herbst | Ketchum, Idaho | 2012 | 12 | 11:16:43 | |
| Sepp Hermann | Fairbanks, Alaska | 1999 | 15 | 13:06:28 | $1,500 |
| Pierre-Antoine Heritier | Geneva, Switzerland | 2010 | 21 | 12:19:26 | |
| Alain Herscher | France | 1996 | 15 | 15:13:08 | $750 |
| J.T. Hessert | Alaska | 2007 | W | – | – |
| Dave Hetman | Ester, Alaska | 1993 | S | – | – |
| Don Hibbs | Two Rivers, Alaska | 1993 | S | – | – |
| Don Hibbs | Two Rivers, Alaska | 1995 | 9 | 12:17:31^{$} | $1,200 |
| Roger Hocking | Fairbanks, Alaska | 1991 | S | – | – |
| Roger Hocking | Fairbanks, Alaska | 1992 | S | – | – |
| Gwen Holdmann | Fox, Alaska | 1998 | 25 | 15:21:35 | – |
| Gwen Holdmann | Fox, Alaska | 2004 | S | – | – |
| Bob Holder | Fairbanks, Alaska | 1988 | 23 | 16:02:12 | |
| Bob Holder | Fairbanks, Alaska | 1989 | 20 | 14:08:42 | |
| Yuka Honda | Healy, Alaska | 2006 | S | – | – |
| Yuka Honda | Healy, Alaska | 2007 | S | – | – |
| Yuka Honda | Healy, Alaska | 2009 | S | – | – |
| Yuka Honda | Healy, Alaska | 2012 | 15 | 12:00:55 | $3,240 |
| Don Honea Sr. | Ruby, Alaska | 1985 | S | – | – |
| Ed Hopkins | Tagish, Yukon | 1993 | 19 | 13:06:33 | $2,000 |
| Ed Hopkins | Tagish, Yukon | 1994 | 8 | 11:15:23 | $3,200 |
| Ed Hopkins | Tagish, Yukon | 1999 | 11 | 12:23:33 | $2,900 |
| Ed Hopkins | Tagish, Yukon | 2013 | 11 | 10:20:17 | $3,780 |
| Ed Hopkins | Tagish, Yukon | 2005^{4} | 8 | 11:19:25 | $4,200 |
| David "Pecos" Humphreys | Talkeetna, Alaska | 1984 | 10 | 13:03:07 | $1,000 |
| David "Pecos" Humphreys | Talkeetna, Alaska | 1987 | S | – | – |
| Douglas Hutchinson | Fairbanks, Alaska | 1992 | S | – | – |
| Douglas Hutchinson | Fairbanks, Alaska | 1993 | 17 | 13:04:00 | $2,200 |
| Douglas Hutchinson | Fairbanks, Alaska | 1994 | S | – | – |
| Michael Hyslop | Whitehorse, Yukon | 1988 | S | – | – |
| Emil Inauen | Switzerland | 2004 | S | – | – |
| Ruedi Indermuhle | Switzerland | 1991 | S | – | – |
| Markus Ingebretsen | Norway | 2013 | 6 | 10:01:48 | $7,030 |
| Dries Jacobs | Bruges, Belgium | 2010 | 12 | 10:15:50 | $4,860 |
| Robin Jacobson | Squaw Lake, Minnesota | 1986 | S | – | – |
| Mike Jayne | Fairbanks, Alaska | 2007 | 8^{@} | 11:03:15 | $7,500 |
| Bruce Johnson | Atlin, British Columbia | 1984 | 6 | 12:18:07 | $2,400 |
| Bruce Johnson | Atlin, British Columbia | 1985 | 8 | 12:05:41 | $1,500 |
| Bruce Johnson | Atlin, British Columbia | 1986 | 1^{†} | 14:09:17 | $15,000 |
| Bruce Johnson | Atlin, British Columbia | 1993 | 2 | 10:22:30 | $20,000 |
| Larry Johnson | Nenana, Alaska | 1987 | 13 | 13:22:48 | $700 |
| Jerry Joinson | Fort St. James, British Columbia | 2009 | S | – | – |
| Jerry Joinson | Fort St. James, British Columbia | 2011 | 12 | 13:03:22 | $4,860 |
| Jerry Joinson | Fort St. James, British Columbia | 2014 | 11 | 13:11:01^{1} | $3,966 |
| Fred Jordan | Tanana, Alaska | 1989 | 13 | 13:06:17 | $1,150 |
| Fred Jordan | Tanana, Alaska | 1994 | S | – | – |
| Fred Jordan | Tanana, Alaska | 2000 | S | – | – |
| Phil Joy | Fairbanks, Alaska | 2006 | S | – | – |
| Phil Joy | Fairbanks, Alaska | 2008 | 12 | 12:22:07 | $6,000 |
| Dan Kaduce | Chatanika, Alaska | 2003 | 10 | 12:02:40^{$} | $3,300 |
| Dan Kaduce | Chatanika, Alaska | 2004 | 6 | 11:20:06 | $6,000 |
| Dan Kaduce | Chatanika, Alaska | 2005 | S | – | – |
| Dan Kaduce | Chatanika, Alaska | 2008 | 8 | 12:03:39 | $9,000 |
| Dan Kaduce | Chatanika, Alaska | 2009 | 8 | 10:12:14 | $8,000 |
| Dan Kaduce | Chatanika, Alaska | 2011 | S | – | – |
| Dan Kaduce | Chatanika, Alaska | 2013 | 9 | 10:10:55 | $4,320 |
| Walter Kaso | Talkeetna, Alaska | 1985 | 7 | 12:04:55 | $1,900 |
| Daniel Keller | Fox, Alaska | 1999 | S | – | – |
| Steven Ketzler | Nenana, Alaska | 1992 | S | – | – |
| Ararad Khatchikian | Italy | 2000 | S | – | – |
| Jeff King | Denali Park, Alaska | 1984 | 5 | 12:10:59 | $3,300 |
| Jeff King | Denali Park, Alaska | 1985 | 4 | 11:14:31 | $4,400 |
| Jeff King | Denali Park, Alaska | 1986 | 2 | 14:09:41 | $10,000 |
| Jeff King | Denali Park, Alaska | 1987 | 3 | 12:04:52 | $5,000* |
| Jeff King | Denali Park, Alaska | 1988 | S | – | – |
| Jeff King | Denali Park, Alaska | 1989 | 1^{†} | 11:20:51 | $20,000 |
| Jeff King | Denali Park, Alaska | 1990 | 2 | 11:20:33 | $10,000 |
| Michael King | Salcha, Alaska | 1996 | 17 | 16:05:49 | – |
| Michael King | Salcha, Alaska | 1997 | S | – | – |
| Michael King | Salcha, Alaska | 1998 | S | – | – |
| Michael King | Salcha, Alaska | 1999 | S | – | – |
| Keith Kirkvold | Fairbanks, Alaska | 1998 | 21 | 14:15:13 | – |
| William Kleedehn | Carcross, Yukon | 1990 | 17 | 13:17:16 | – |
| William Kleedehn | Carcross, Yukon | 1993 | 11 | 12:05:45 | $3,200 |
| William Kleedehn | Carcross, Yukon | 1998 | 7 | 12:03:40 | $5,000 |
| William Kleedehn | Carcross, Yukon | 2000 | S | – | – |
| William Kleedehn | Carcross, Yukon | 2001 | 3 | 11:19:18^{2} | $18,000 |
| William Kleedehn | Carcross, Yukon | 2002 | 5 | 11:16:20 | $8,000 |
| William Kleedehn | Carcross, Yukon | 2003 | 2 | 11:07:04 | $24,000 |
| William Kleedehn | Carcross, Yukon | 2004 | S | – | – |
| William Kleedehn | Carcross, Yukon | 2005 | 2^{@} | 11:00:40 | $24,000 |
| William Kleedehn | Carcross, Yukon | 2006 | 3 | 10:09:05^{$} | $18,000 |
| William Kleedehn | Carcross, Yukon | 2007 | 4 | 10:12:12 | $14,500 |
| William Kleedehn | Carcross, Yukon | 2009 | 6 | 10:11:16 | $12,000* |
| Dave Klumb | Fairbanks, Alaska | 1984 | S | – | – |
| Christopher Knott | Fairbanks, Alaska | 2002 | 13 | 12:15:23 | $2,100 |
| Dennis Kogl | Denali Park, Alaska | 1985 | 6 | 12:02:31 | $3,300 |
| Dennis Kogl | Denali Park, Alaska | 1988 | 8 | 13:18:53 | $2,250 |
| Torsten Kohnert | Sweden | 2014 | 6 | 11:06:16 | $7,944 |
| Beat Korner | Switzerland | 1991 | 23 | 15:06:42^{1} | – |
| Mike Kramer | Two Rivers, Alaska | 1988 | S | – | – |
| Kris Krestensen | Two Rivers, Alaska | 1989 | S | – | – |
| Jim Kublin | Marquette, Michigan | 1992 | 16 | 16:00:30 | $850 |
| Gerry Kuzyk | Whitehorse, Yukon | 1994 | 20 | 13:03:27 | $1,440 |
| John Langham | Talkeetna, Alaska | 1994 | S | – | – |
| Bruce Langmaid | Blackstock, Ontario | 2005 | S | – | – |
| Brian Lawson | Fairbanks, Alaska | 1990 | S | – | – |
| Jocelyne LeBlanc | Whitehorse, Yukon | 2010^{@} | 22^{1} | 13:09:16 | – |
| Ann Ledwidge | Dawson City, Yukon | 2008 | 13 | 13:20:12 | $5,000 |
| Peter Ledwidge | Dawson City, Yukon | 1999 | 20 | 15:03:46^{1} | – |
| Peter Ledwidge | Dawson City, Yukon | 2000 | 17 | 13:10:20 | – |
| Peter Ledwidge | Dawson City, Yukon | 2002 | S | – | – |
| Peter Ledwidge | Dawson City, Yukon | 2003 | 9 | 12:02:23 | $3,700 |
| Peter Ledwidge | Dawson City, Yukon | 2004 | 4 | 11:18:51 | $12,000 |
| Peter Ledwidge | Dawson City, Yukon | 2005 | 11 | 11:22:36 | $2,900 |
| Peter Ledwidge | Dawson City, Yukon | 2007 | S | – | – |
| Bruce Lee | Denali Park, Alaska | 1986 | 12 | 14:16:41 | $800 |
| Bruce Lee | Denali Park, Alaska | 1988 | 5 | 13:04:22 | $5,000 |
| Bruce Lee | Denali Park, Alaska | 1989 | 4 | 11:23:35 | $7,000 |
| Bruce Lee | Denali Park, Alaska | 1991 | 2 | 10:21:17 | $20,000 |
| Bruce Lee | Denali Park, Alaska | 1998^{3} | 1^{†} | 11:11:27 | $30,000 |
| Darrin Lee | Chistochina, Alaska | 2003 | S | – | – |
| Darrin Lee | Chistochina, Alaska | 2013 | 16^{@} | 11:09:05 | – |
| Ben LeFebvre | Whitehorse, Yukon | 1988 | S | – | – |
| Andrew Lesh | Fairbanks, Alaska | 1997 | 14 | 14:15:08 | $1,800 |
| Andrew Lesh | Fairbanks, Alaska | 2000 | 10 | 11:21:02 | $3,300 |
| Andrew Lesh | Fairbanks, Alaska | 2001 | 2 | 11:16:16 | $24,000 |
| David Likins | Forty Mile, Alaska | 1988 | S | – | – |
| Sonny Lindner | Two Rivers, Alaska | 1984 | 1^{†} | 12:00:05 | $15,000 |
| Sonny Lindner | Two Rivers, Alaska | 1986 | 4 | 14:10:48 | $4,400 |
| Sonny Lindner | Two Rivers, Alaska | 1989 | 6 | 12:00:39 | $3,500 |
| Sonny Lindner | Two Rivers, Alaska | 1991 | 8 | 11:16:15 | $2,250 |
| Sonny Lindner | Two Rivers, Alaska | 1992 | 2 | 11:23:10^{2} | $20,270 |
| Sonny Lindner | Two Rivers, Alaska | 2010^{4} | 6 | 09:21:17 | $10,545 |
| Sonny Lindner | Two Rivers, Alaska | 2012 | 7 | 10:09:05 | $8,925 |
| Shirley Liss | Fairbanks, Alaska | 1984 | 20 | No time^{1}^{c} | – |
| Shirley Liss | Fairbanks, Alaska | 1985 | 27 | 18:10:28 | – |
| Jon Little | Kasilof, Alaska | 2005 | 5 | 11:03:10 | $8,000 |
| Jon Little | Kasilof, Alaska | 2009 | 3 | 10:00:28 | $18,000 |
| Jerry Louden | Two Rivers, Alaska | 1997 | 6 | 12:17:23 | $6,000 |
| Jerry Louden | Two Rivers, Alaska | 1998 | 12 | 12:08:48 | $2,500 |
| Jerry Louden | Two Rivers, Alaska | 1999 | 10 | 12:19:38 | $3,300 |
| Jerry Louden | Two Rivers, Alaska | 2000 | 11 | 11:22:06 | $2,900 |
| Jerry Louden | Two Rivers, Alaska | 2001 | 10 | 12:12:11 | $3,300 |
| Bur Lydic | Salcha, Alaska | 1986 | S | – | – |
| Brian MacDougall | Whitehorse, Yukon | 1989 | S | – | – |
| Brian MacDougall | Whitehorse, Yukon | 1994 | 9 | 11:15:24 | $2,690 |
| Brian MacDougall | Whitehorse, Yukon | 1998 | 9 | 12:05:44 | $3,700 |
| Brenda Mackey | Nenana, Alaska | 1998 | 18 | 14:13:47 | – |
| Jason Mackey | Kasilof, Alaska | 2009 | S | – | – |
| Lance Mackey | Fox, Alaska | 2005^{#} | 1^{†} | 11:00:32 | $30,000 |
| Lance Mackey | Fox, Alaska | 2006 | 1^{†} | 10:07:47 | $30,000* |
| Lance Mackey | Fox, Alaska | 2007 | 1^{†} | 10:02:37 | $40,000* |
| Lance Mackey | Fox, Alaska | 2008 | 1^{†} | 10:12:14^{$} | $35,000* |
| Lance Mackey | Fox, Alaska | 2010 | 2 | 9:02:08 | $20,280 |
| Lance Mackey | Fox, Alaska | 2012 | 3 | 9:22:30 | $16,215 |
| Rick Mackey | Nenana, Alaska | 1996^{#} | 2 | 12:17:04 | $19,000 |
| Rick Mackey | Nenana, Alaska | 1997^{3} | 1^{†} | 12:05:55 | $30,000 |
| Rick Mackey | Nenana, Alaska | 1998 | 3 | 11:21:09 | $18,000 |
| Scott MacManus | Fairbanks, Alaska | 1991 | S | – | – |
| Gene Mahler | Fairbanks, Alaska | 1991 | 15 | 12:15:45 | $900 |
| Keli Mahoney | Talkeetna, Alaska | 2001 | S | – | – |
| Keli Mahoney | Talkeetna, Alaska | 2002 | 22 | 14:03:11 | – |
| Jeff Mann | Mentasta, Alaska | 1992 | 12 | 13:18:35 | $1,520 |
| Jeff Mann | Mentasta, Alaska | 1993 | 6^{@} | 11:10:23 | $6,500 |
| Marcel Marin | Yellowknife, Northwest Territories | 2004 | 14^{@} | 13:05:04 | $1,800 |
| Wade Marrs | Wasilla, Alaska | 2011 | S | – | – |
| Newton Marshall | Jamaica | 2009 | 13^{@} | 11:19:02 | $4,000 |
| Martin Massicotte | St-Tite, Quebec | 2003^{#} | 7 | 11:21:10 | $5,000 |
| Martin Massicotte | St-Tite, Quebec | 2005 | S | – | – |
| Mike Maurer | Salcha, Alaska | 1989 | 22 | 14:09:55 | – |
| Mike Maurer | Salcha, Alaska | 1990 | DQ | – | – |
| Joe May | Trapper Creek, Alaska | 1985^{4} | 9 | 12:06:05 | $1,200 |
| Joe May | Trapper Creek, Alaska | 1986 | 9 | 14:13:23 | $1,200 |
| Mark May | North Pole, Alaska | 1994 | 19 | 13:03:03 | $1,600 |
| Mark May | North Pole, Alaska | 1996^{4} | 4 | 13:00:52 | $10,000 |
| Mark May | North Pole, Alaska | 1997 | 4 | 12:07:25 | $12,000 |
| Mark May | North Pole, Alaska | 1999 | 2 | 11:08:37 | $24,000 |
| Mark May | North Pole, Alaska | 2004 | S | – | – |
| Ollen Ray Mayo | Trapper Creek, Alaska | 1993 | S | – | – |
| Bob McAlpin | Fairbanks, Alaska | 2007 | 21 | 14:22:35^{1} | – |
| Darwin McLeod | Ninilchik, Alaska | 1990 | 7 | 12:14:31 | $2,800 |
| Scott McManus | Fairbanks, Alaska | 1991 | S | – | – |
| Terry McMullin | Eagle, Alaska | 1998 | S | – | – |
| Lolly Medley | Wasilla, Alaska | 1987 | DQ | – | – |
| Jimmy Miller | Ester, Alaska | 1991 | 19 | 14:14:01 | $700 |
| Bruce Milne | Two Rivers, Alaska | 2000 | 20 | 15:01:39 | – |
| Bruce Milne | Two Rivers, Alaska | 2001 | 19 | 16:06:59^{1} | – |
| Bruce Milne | Two Rivers, Alaska | 2003 | 17 | 14:10:01 | – |
| Bruce Milne | Two Rivers, Alaska | 2004 | 19 | 14:00:29 | – |
| Bruce Milne | Two Rivers, Alaska | 2008 | S | – | – |
| David Milne | Two Rivers, Alaska | 2003 | 14 | 13:00:43 | $1,800 |
| John Mitchell | Dawson City, Yukon | 1985 | 23 | 14:22:00 | – |
| Lorrina Mitchell | Whitehorse, Yukon | 1984 | 11 | 13:03:08 | $900 |
| Lorrina Mitchell | Whitehorse, Yukon | 1987 | S | – | – |
| Lorrina Mitchell | Whitehorse, Yukon | 1988 | 14 | 14:16:58 | $950 |
| Dider Moggia | Whitehorse, Yukon | 2008 | S | – | – |
| Dider Moggia | Whitehorse, Yukon | 2009 | S | – | – |
| Dider Moggia | Whitehorse, Yukon | 2011 | S | – | – |
| Roy Monk | England | 1993 | S | – | – |
| Dave Monson | Manley, Alaska | 1987 | 2 | 12:04:44 | $10,000 |
| Dave Monson | Manley, Alaska | 1988 | 1^{†} | 12:05:06 | $20,000 |
| Dave Monson | Manley, Alaska | 2002 | 4 | 11:14:49 | $12,000 |
| Allen Moore | Two Rivers, Alaska | 2011^{4} | 6 | 11:07:32 | $10,545 |
| Allen Moore | Two Rivers, Alaska | 2012 | 2 | 09:17:06 | $20,280* |
| Allen Moore | Two Rivers, Alaska | 2013 | 1^{†} | 08:18:39 | $18,930 |
| Allen Moore | Two Rivers, Alaska | 2014 | 1^{†} | 08:14:21 | $21,770 |
| Becca Moore | Willow, Alaska | 2008 | S | – | – |
| Becca Moore | Willow, Alaska | 2009 | 17 | 13:22:49 | – |
| Gary Moore | Willow, Alaska | 1990 | S | – | – |
| Diana Moroney | Chugiak, Alaska | 2002 | 16 | 13:00:13 | – |
| Andreas Moser | Germany | 2008 | S | – | – |
| Tim Mowry | Two Rivers, Alaska | 1990 | 14 | 13:10:05 | $950 |
| Tim Mowry | Two Rivers, Alaska | 1992^{4} | 10 | 13:10:59 | $1,925 |
| Tim Mowry | Two Rivers, Alaska | 1993 | 12 | 12:13:58 | $3,000 |
| Tim Mowry | Two Rivers, Alaska | 1994 | 12 | 11:21:44 | $2,400 |
| Tim Mowry | Two Rivers, Alaska | 1995 | 6 | 11:15:52 | $2,400 |
| Tim Mowry | Two Rivers, Alaska | 1997 | 10 | 13:17:25 | $3,300 |
| Tim Mowry | Two Rivers, Alaska | 1998 | 14 | 12:23:10 | $1,800 |
| Steve Mullen | Kasilof, Alaska | 1988 | S | – | – |
| Steve Mullen | Kasilof, Alaska | 1993 | S | – | – |
| Steve Mullen | Kasilof, Alaska | 1997 | S | – | – |
| Andre Nadeau | Ste. Melanie, Quebec | 1998^{#} | 2 | 11:15:13^{2} | $24,000* |
| John Nash | Nenana, Alaska | 1988 | S | – | – |
| Mandy Nauman | Fairbanks, Alaska | 2014 | 9 | 13:02:12 | $4,882 |
| Hugh Neff | Skagway, Alaska | 2000 | 13^{@} | 12:00:57 | $2,100 |
| Hugh Neff | Skagway, Alaska | 2001 | S | – | – |
| Hugh Neff | Skagway, Alaska | 2002 | 11 | 12:03:13 | $2,900 |
| Hugh Neff | Skagway, Alaska | 2003 | 8 | 11:23:30 | $4,200 |
| Hugh Neff | Skagway, Alaska | 2005 | 3 | 11:01:50 | $18,000* |
| Hugh Neff | Skagway, Alaska | 2006 | S | – | – |
| Hugh Neff | Skagway, Alaska | 2007 | 9 | 11:09:26 | $7,000 |
| Hugh Neff | Skagway, Alaska | 2008 | 7 | 11:21:24 | $11,000 |
| Hugh Neff | Skagway, Alaska | 2009 | 2 | 09:23:24 | $22,000 |
| Hugh Neff | Skagway, Alaska | 2010 | 3 | 09:03:12 | $16,215 |
| Hugh Neff | Skagway, Alaska | 2011 | W | – | – |
| Hugh Neff | Skagway, Alaska | 2012 | 1^{†} | 09:17:05 | $28,395 |
| Hugh Neff | Skagway, Alaska | 2013 | 2 | 08:19:55 | $13,520* |
| Hugh Neff | Skagway, Alaska | 2014 | 2 | 08:23:07 | $15,548 |
| Jamie Nelson | Togo, Minnesota | 2002 | 19 | 13:15:57 | – |
| Louis Nelson Sr. | Kotzebue, Alaska | 1998 | 16 | 13:03:45 | – |
| Sam Nelson | Two Rivers, Alaska | 1993 | 23 | 13:08:34 | – |
| Ralph Nestor | Goldstream Valley, Alaska | 1986 | S | – | – |
| Eric Nicolier | Fairbanks | 2000 | 16 | 13:10:15 | – |
| Eric Nicolier | Fairbanks | 2001 | S | – | – |
| Eric Nicolier | Fairbanks | 2004 | S | – | – |
| Pascal Nicoud | Switzerland | 1994 | S | – | – |
| Stanley Njootli | Old Crow, Yukon | 1995 | S | – | – |
| Stanley Njootli | Old Crow, Yukon | 1996 | 18 | 16:18:55^{1} | – |
| Stanley Njootli | Old Crow, Yukon | 1998 | S | – | – |
| Stanley Njootli | Old Crow, Yukon | 1999 | 16 | 13:07:00 | – |
| Petr Noelle | Welver, Germany | 1999 | S | – | – |
| Chad Nordlum | Kotzebue, Alaska | 2002 | 14 | 12:20:07 | $1,800 |
| Lucy Nordlum | Kotzebue, Alaska | 1992 | 11 | 13:12:55 | $1,722 |
| Brian O'Donoghue | Two Rivers, Alaska | 1998 | 26 | 16:00:08^{1} | – |
| Dave O'Farrell | Tagish, Yukon | 1997 | 9^{@} | 13:12:05 | $3,700 |
| Jim Oeschlager | Cincinnati, Ohio | 2001 | 17 | 14:19:24 | – |
| Hans Oettli | Whitehorse, Yukon | 1987 | S | – | – |
| Hans Oettli | Whitehorse, Yukon | 1990 | DQ | – | – |
| Dave Olesen | Horfrost River, Northwest Territories | 1998 | 13 | 12:09:36^{$} | $2,100 |
| Dave Olesen | Horfrost River, Northwest Territories | 2000 | 6 | 11:09:29 | $6,000 |
| Tim Osmar | Clam Gulch, Alaska | 1986 | 3 | 14:14:21 | $5,000 |
| Tim Osmar | Clam Gulch, Alaska | 2001 | 1^{†} | 11:15:10 | $30,000* |
| Tim Osmar | Clam Gulch, Alaska | 2002 | 8 | 11:22:48 | $4,200 |
| Andrew Pace | Healy, Alaska | 2019 | 18 | 11:19:42 | – |
| Andrew Pace | Healy, Alaska | 2016 | 16 | – | – |
| Kristin Knight Pace | Healy, Alaska | 2015 | 15 | 12:11:05 | $3,000 |
| Warren Palfrey | Yellowknife, Northwest Territories | 2009 | 9 | 10:22:26 | $7,000 |
| Walter Palkovitch | Two Rivers, Alaska | 1998 | 22 | 14:15:41 | – |
| Walter Palkovitch | Two Rivers, Alaska | 1999 | S | – | – |
| Greg Parvin | Nome, Alaska | 2007 | S | – | – |
| Misha Pedersen | Willow, Alaska | 2012 | 17 | 12:13:18 | – |
| John Peep | Fairbanks, Alaska | 1992^{#} | 8 | 13:08:30 | $2,280 |
| John Peep | Fairbanks, Alaska | 1993 | 8 | 11:14:34 | $4,000 |
| John Peep | Fairbanks, Alaska | 1994 | 13 | 11:21:53 | $2,240 |
| John Peep | Fairbanks, Alaska | 1995 | S | – | – |
| Mike Peep | Fairbanks, Alaska | 1995 | 11 | 14:10:20 | – |
| Bob Pelling | Charlie Lake, Alaska | 1989 | S | – | – |
| Curt Perano | Willow, Alaska | 2014 | 7 | 11:23:29 | $6,724 |
| Sam Perrino | Yellowknife, Northwest Territories | 2005 | S | – | – |
| Kate Persons | Kotzebue, Alaska | 1988 | 6 | 13:15:02 | $3,500 |
| Kate Persons | Kotzebue, Alaska | 1989 | 5 | 12:00:29 | $5,000 |
| Kate Persons | Kotzebue, Alaska | 1990 | 4 | 12:02:05 | $7,000 |
| Michelle Phillips | Tagish, Yukon | 2004 | 8 | 12:03:46 | $4,200 |
| Michelle Phillips | Tagish, Yukon | 2006 | 8 | 11:09:10 | $4,200 |
| Michelle Phillips | Tagish, Yukon | 2007 | 6 | 11:01:47 | $10,500 |
| Michelle Phillips | Tagish, Yukon | 2008 | 4 | 11:10:21 | $16,500 |
| Michelle Phillips | Tagish, Yukon | 2009 | 5 | 10:09:41^{$} | $12,500 |
| Michelle Phillips | Tagish, Yukon | 2011 | S | – | – |
| Catherine Pinard | Carcross, Yukon | 2003 | 12 | 12:18:56 | – |
| Catherine Pinard | Carcross, Yukon | 2004 | 13 | 12:23:16 | $2,100 |
| Catherine Pinard | Carcross, Yukon | 2005 | S | – | – |
| Bill Pinkham | Glenwood Springs, Colorado | 2001 | 15 | 14:05:05 | $1,500 |
| Bill Pinkham | Glenwood Springs, Colorado | 2002 | 23 | 14:09:33 | – |
| Bill Pinkham | Glenwood Springs, Colorado | 2008 | 10 | 12:09:12 | – |
| Bill Pinkham | Glenwood Springs, Colorado | 2009 | 16 | 12:18:16 | – |
| James Poage | Central, Alaska | 1988 | 27 | 14:02:57 | – |
| James Poage | Central, Alaska | 1989 | S | – | – |
| Marc Poage | Central, Alaska | 1988 | 28 | 19:07:43 | – |
| Marc Poage | Central, Alaska | 1989 | S | – | – |
| Marc Poage | Central, Alaska | 1990 | 15 | 13:14:54 | – |
| Marc Poage | Central, Alaska | 1991 | S | – | – |
| Scott Poage | Central, Alaska | 1988 | S | – | – |
| Scott Poage | Central, Alaska | 1991 | S | – | – |
| Andy Polleczek | North Pole, Alaska | 1999 | S | – | – |
| Jennifer Raffaeli | Fox, Alaska | 2010 | 19 | 12:03:32 | – |
| Tom Randall | Whitehorse, Yukon | 1988 | 26 | 17:14:40 | – |
| Tom Randall | Whitehorse, Yukon | 1989 | S | – | – |
| Kurt Reich | Divide, Colorado | 2012 | W | – | – |
| Ketil Reitan | Kaktovik, Alaska | 1989 | 21 | 14:09:52 | – |
| Jim Reiter | Central, Alaska | 1987 | S | – | – |
| Jim Reiter | Central, Alaska | 1988 | 24 | 17:13:29 | – |
| Jim Reiter | Central, Alaska | 1990 | 25 | 15:23:39 | – |
| Jim Reiter | Central, Alaska | 1994 | 22 | 15:18:32 | – |
| Russ Ridlington | Nenana, Alaska | 1985 | S | – | – |
| Gerald Riley | Nenana, Alaska | 1984 | 7 | 12:21:58 | $1,900 |
| Gerald Riley | Nenana, Alaska | 1985 | S | – | – |
| Gerald Riley | Nenana, Alaska | 1988 | 2 | 12:15:01 | $15,000 |
| Christine Roalofs | Anchorage, Alaska | 2011 | W | – | – |
| Frank Robbins | Eagle, Alaska | 1986 | S | – | – |
| Colleen Robertia | Kasilof, Alaska | 2009 | 12 | 11:17:47 | $5,000 |
| Susan Rogan | Whitehorse, Yukon | 2013 | 10 | 10:14:39 | $3,780 |
| Randolph Romanesko | Nome, Alaska | 1991 | 14 | 12:09:21 | $1,100 |
| Darren Rorabaugh | Fairbanks, Alaska | 1995 | S | – | – |
| Darren Rorabaugh | Fairbanks, Alaska | 1997 | 11 | 13:17:58 | $2,900 |
| Darren Rorabaugh | Fairbanks, Alaska | 2000 | 9 | 11:20:18 | $3,700 |
| Tamara Rose | Fairbanks, Alaska | 2011 | 10 | 13:00:58 | $5,670 |
| Ron Rosser | Pleasant Valley, Alaska | 1985 | 21 | 14:02:00 | – |
| Ron Rosser | Pleasant Valley, Alaska | 1986 | 24 | 16:11:50 | – |
| Ron Rosser | Pleasant Valley, Alaska | 1988 | 17 | 15:05:26 | – |
| Jon Rudolph | Whitehorse, Yukon | 1985 | 14 | 12:16:37 | $600 |
| Jon Rudolph | Whitehorse, Yukon | 1986 | 10 | 14:13:53 | $1,000 |
| Heidi Ruh | Tagish, Yukon | 1991 | 18 | 14:13:37 | $750 |
| Joe Runyan | Tanana, Alaska | 1984 | 4 | 12:07:51 | $4,400 |
| Joe Runyan | Tanana, Alaska | 1985 | 1^{†} | 11:11:55 | $15,000 |
| Phillippe A. Russell | Fairbanks, Alaska | 2000 | 19 | 14:23:52 | – |
| Johannes Rygh | Kasilof, Alaska | 2011 | W | – | – |
| Ed Salter | Manley, Alaska | 1987 | 8 | 13:05:12 | $1,500 |
| Wilson Sam | Two Rivers, Alaska | 1984 | 15 | 13:20:38 | $500 |
| Paddy Santucci | Lincoln Creek, Alaska | 1994 | 17 | 12:18:06 | $4,000 |
| Paddy Santucci | Lincoln Creek, Alaska | 1996 | 9 | 13:09:11 | $3,000 |
| Paddy Santucci | Lincoln Creek, Alaska | 1998 | 6 | 12:03:08 | $6,000 |
| Brent Sass | Fairbanks, Alaska | 2007 | 15 | 12:08:06 | $4,000 |
| Brent Sass | Fairbanks, Alaska | 2008 | 5^{@} | 11:12:18 | $14,500 |
| Brent Sass | Fairbanks, Alaska | 2009^{4} | 7 | 10:11:54 | $10,000 |
| Brent Sass | Fairbanks, Alaska | 2010 | 8 | 10:03:28 | $7,290 |
| Brent Sass | Fairbanks, Alaska | 2011^{4} | 4 | 10:19:02 | $13,380 |
| Brent Sass | Fairbanks, Alaska | 2012 | 5 | 10:07:12 | $11,760 |
| Brent Sass | Fairbanks, Alaska | 2013^{4} | 3 | 09:05:52 | $10,810 |
| Brent Sass | Fairbanks, Alaska | 2014 | W^{d} | – | – |
| Becky Sather | Healy, Alaska | 1990 | S | – | – |
| Becky Sather | Healy, Alaska | 1993 | S | – | – |
| David Sawatzky | Healy, Alaska | 1987 | 14 | 14:03:49 | $600 |
| David Sawatzky | Healy, Alaska | 1988 | S | – | – |
| David Sawatzky | Healy, Alaska | 1989 | 16 | 13:11:14 | – |
| David Sawatzky | Healy, Alaska | 1990 | 8 | 12:16:30 | – |
| David Sawatzky | Healy, Alaska | 1991 | 4 | 11:11:37 | $10,000 |
| David Sawatzky | Healy, Alaska | 1992 | 5^{@} | 12:04:01 | $6,587 |
| David Sawatzky | Healy, Alaska | 1994 | S | – | – |
| David Sawatzky | Healy, Alaska | 2001 | S | – | – |
| David Sawatzky | Healy, Alaska | 2002 | 12 | 12:05:58 | – |
| John Schandelmeier | Paxson, Alaska | 1986 | 8 | 14:12:23 | $1,500 |
| John Schandelmeier | Paxson, Alaska | 1987 | 6 | 12:22:16 | $2,400 |
| John Schandelmeier | Paxson, Alaska | 1988 | 7 | 13:15:24 | $2,800 |
| John Schandelmeier | Paxson, Alaska | 1990 | 12 | 12:22:16 | $1,350 |
| John Schandelmeier | Paxson, Alaska | 1991 | 3 | 10:22:03 | $15,000 |
| John Schandelmeier | Paxson, Alaska | 1992^{3} | 1^{†} | 11:21:40 | $29,837* |
| John Schandelmeier | Paxson, Alaska | 1994 | 4 | 11:02:47^{$} | $8,000 |
| John Schandelmeier | Paxson, Alaska | 1996^{3} | 1^{†} | 12:16:06^{$2} | $25,000* |
| John Schandelmeier | Paxson, Alaska | 1997^{4} | 3 | 12:07:08^{2} | $18,000* |
| John Schandelmeier | Paxson, Alaska | 1998 | 4 | 11:22:19 | $12,000 |
| John Schandelmeier | Paxson, Alaska | 1999 | 6 | 12:03:45 | $6,000 |
| John Schandelmeier | Paxson, Alaska | 2001 | 5 | 12:00:04 | $8,000 |
| John Schandelmeier | Paxson, Alaska | 2003^{4} | 4 | 11:07:56 | $12,000 |
| John Schandelmeier | Paxson, Alaska | 2004 | 7 | 12:01:58 | $5,000 |
| John Schandelmeier | Paxson, Alaska | 2005 | 10 | 11:21:09 | $3,300 |
| John Schandelmeier | Paxson, Alaska | 2007 | 11 | 11:14:53 | $6,000 |
| John Schandelmeier | Paxson, Alaska | 2014 | 5 | 11:00:28 | $8,859 |
| David Scheer | Kasilof, Alaska | 1989 | 18 | 14:04:47 | – |
| David Scheer | Kasilof, Alaska | 1991 | 7 | 11:15:35 | $3,000 |
| David Scheer | Kasilof, Alaska | 1993 | S | – | – |
| Tonya Schlentner | Manley, Alaska | 1991 | 22 | 15:06:17 | – |
| Ingabritt Scholven | Germany | 1997 | S | – | – |
| Karin Schmidt | North Pole, Alaska | 1987 | 17 | 14:18:18 | – |
| Dave Schmitz | Alaska | 1986 | S | – | – |
| Sebastian Schnuelle | Whitehorse, Yukon | 1999 | S | – | – |
| Sebastian Schnuelle | Whitehorse, Yukon | 2004 | 10 | 12:04:41 | $3,300 |
| Sebastian Schnuelle | Whitehorse, Yukon | 2005 | 9 | 11:20:20 | $3,700 |
| Sebastian Schnuelle | Whitehorse, Yukon | 2006 | 6 | 11:02:31 | $6,000 |
| Sebastian Schnuelle | Whitehorse, Yukon | 2007^{4} | 7 | 11:02:40^{$} | $9,500 |
| Sebastian Schnuelle | Whitehorse, Yukon | 2009 | 1^{†} | 09:23:20 | $30,000 |
| Sebastian Schnuelle | Whitehorse, Yukon | 2011 | 2 | 10:12:26 | |
| Michael Schwandt | Soldotna, Alaska | 1986 | 26 | 19:02:19^{1} | – |
| Dallas Seavey | Seward, Alaska | 2011 | 1^{†} | 10:11:53 | |
| Ralph Seekins | Fairbanks, Alaska | 1989 | 23 | 14:14:17 | – |
| Dean Seibold | Delta Junction, Alaska | 1986 | 23 | 16:06:46 | – |
| Dean Seibold | Delta Junction, Alaska | 1987 | 10 | 13:08:30 | $1,000 |
| Dean Seibold | Delta Junction, Alaska | 1994 | 14 | 11:23:19 | $2,080 |
| LeRoy Shank | Fairbanks, Alaska | 1987 | 20 | 15:12:12 | – |
| LeRoy Shank | Fairbanks, Alaska | 1990 | S | – | – |
| Mary Shields | Schimmelpfennig Creek, Alaska | 1984 | 16 | 14:17:19 | – |
| Mary Shields | Schimmelpfennig Creek, Alaska | 1986 | 11 | 14:14:59 | $900 |
| Mary Shields | Schimmelpfennig Creek, Alaska | 1988 | 16 | 14:17:15 | – |
| Knowland Silas | Old Minto, Alaska | 1990 | S | – | – |
| Donald Smidt | Van Dyne, Wisconsin | 2008 | W | – | – |
| Mark Sleightholme | Mossley, England | 2009 | 11 | 11:17:34 | $5,500 |
| Kurt Smith | North Pole, Alaska | 1995 | S | – | – |
| Kurt Smith | North Pole, Alaska | 1996 | S | – | – |
| Kurt Smith | North Pole, Alaska | 1998 | S | – | – |
| Larry Smith | Dawson City, Yukon | 1988 | S | – | – |
| Larry Smith | Dawson City, Yukon | 1989 | 17 | 14:01:06 | – |
| Larry Smith | Dawson City, Yukon | 1990 | 13 | 13:03:20 | $1,150 |
| Larry Smith | Dawson City, Yukon | 1994 | 15 | 12:06:07 | $1,920 |
| Larry Smith | Dawson City, Yukon | 1995 | 5^{@} | 11:01:13 | $3,000* |
| Scott Smith | Willow, Alaska | 2013^{#} | 5 | 09:16:52 | $7,840 |
| Cim Smyth | Big Lake, Alaska | 2000^{#} | 7 | 11:17:41 | $5,000 |
| Cim Smyth | Big Lake, Alaska | 2001 | 7 | 12:08:22 | $5,000 |
| Vince Stack | Pleasant Valley, Alaska | 1987 | S | – | – |
| Mark Stamm | Bothell, Washington | 1988 | 18 | 15:05:29 | – |
| Zach Steer | Sheep Mountain, Alaska | 2004^{#} | 2 | 11:03:32^{2} | $24,000 |
| Zach Steer | Sheep Mountain, Alaska | 2010 | 4 | 09:15:55 | $13,380 |
| Jack Stevens | Sunshine, Alaska | 1984 | S | – | – |
| Bill Stewart | Whitehorse, Yukon | 1995 | 7 | 11:21:45 | $1,900 |
| Bill Stewart | Whitehorse, Yukon | 1996 | 3 | 13:00:23 | $14,000 |
| Bill Steyer | Fairbanks, Alaska | 1998 | 20 | 14:14:39 | – |
| Bill Steyer | Fairbanks, Alaska | 2001 | 14 | 13:04:23 | $1,800 |
| Bill Steyer | Fairbanks, Alaska | 2002 | 6 | 11:21:39^{$} | $6,000 |
| Bill Steyer | Fairbanks, Alaska | 2003 | 5 | 11:14:01 | $8,000 |
| Norman Stoppenbrink | Manley, Alaska | 1993 | 16 | 12:23:39 | $2,300 |
| Sig Stormo | Soldotna, Alaska | 2001 | S | – | – |
| Cody Strathe | Fairbanks, Alaska | 2013 | 15 | 11:06:38 | $2,160 |
| Cody Strathe | Fairbanks, Alaska | 2014 | W | – | – |
| Jim Strong | Hope, Alaska | 1988 | 22 | 16:01:50 | – |
| Crispin Studer | Switzerland | 2004 | 18 | 13:15:12 | – |
| Crispin Studer | Switzerland | 2013 | 13 | 11:00:30 | $2,700 |
| Harry Sutherland | Delta Junction, Alaska | 1984 | 2 | 12:05:15 | $10,000 |
| Harry Sutherland | Delta Junction, Alaska | 1985 | 3 | 11:13:25 | $5,800 |
| Harry Sutherland | Delta Junction, Alaska | 1986 | 5 | 14:11:01 | $3,300 |
| Harry Sutherland | Delta Junction, Alaska | 1989 | 4 | 13:08:23 | $950 |
| Iris Wood Sutton | Fairbanks, Alaska | 2009 | 18 | 13:23:17^{1} | $1,000 |
| Kris Swanguarin | Healy, Alaska | 1996 | 11 | 14:09:26 | $2,000 |
| Kris Swanguarin | Healy, Alaska | 1999 | S | – | – |
| Kathy Swenson | Two Rivers, Alaska | 1986 | 17 | 15:01:06 | – |
| Kathy Swenson | Two Rivers, Alaska | 1987 | 4 | 12:05:10 | $4,400 |
| Kathy Swenson | Two Rivers, Alaska | 1988 | 3 | 12:16:14 | $10,000 |
| Kathy Swenson | Two Rivers, Alaska | 1994 | 6 | 11:04:45 | $5,200* |
| Kathy Swenson | Two Rivers, Alaska | 1997 | S | – | – |
| Alistair Taylor | Scotland | 1996 | 8 | 13:09:02 | $3,500 |
| Paul Taylor | Fairbanks, Alaska | 1990 | 22 | 15:22:13 | – |
| Paul Taylor | Fairbanks, Alaska | 1991 | S | – | – |
| Paul Taylor | Fairbanks, Alaska | 1992 | S | – | – |
| Paul Taylor | Fairbanks, Alaska | 1995 | S | – | – |
| Michael Telpin | Chukotka, Russia | 2012 | 19 | 15:07:56^{1} | – |
| Floyd Terry | Nenana, Alaska | 1986 | S | – | – |
| Floyd Terry | Nenana, Alaska | 1987 | DQ | – | – |
| Thomas Tetz | Tagish, Yukon | 1998 | 24^{@} | 15:20:09 | – |
| Thomas Tetz | Tagish, Yukon | 1999 | 9 | 12:19:09 | $3,700 |
| Thomas Tetz | Tagish, Yukon | 2000 | 2 | 10:23:27^{2} | $24,000 |
| Thomas Tetz | Tagish, Yukon | 2002 | 3 | 11:10:23 | $18,000 |
| Thomas Tetz | Tagish, Yukon | 2003 | 3 | 11:07:08 | $18,000 |
| Thomas Tetz | Tagish, Yukon | 2004^{4} | 9 | 12:03:49 | $3,700 |
| Peter Thomann | Willow, Alaska | 1990 | 6 | 12:14:27 | $3,500 |
| Connor H. Thomas | Nome, Alaska | 1991 | 13 | 12:02:52 | $1,300 |
| Ralph Tingey | Denali Park, Alaska | 1986 | 25 | 16:12:05 | – |
| Ralph Tingey | Denali Park, Alaska | 1987 | 11 | 13:08:37 | $900 |
| Ralph Tingey | Denali Park, Alaska | 1988 | 9 | 13:21:06 | $1,950 |
| Denis Tremblay | Quebec | 2011 | S | – | – |
| Denis Tremblay | Quebec | 2013 | 14 | 11:04:02 | $2,430 |
| Kathy Tucker | Manley, Alaska | 1987 | DQ | – | – |
| Kathy Tucker | Manley, Alaska | 1989 | 9 | 13:03:08 | $1,950 |
| Kevin Turnbough | Grand Marais, Minnesota | 1984 | 9 | 12:23:12 | $1,400 |
| Kevin Turnbough | Grand Marais, Minnesota | 1987 | 15 | 14:08:08 | $500 |
| Dan Turner | Haines, Alaska | 1996 | S | – | – |
| Dan Turner | Haines, Alaska | 1998 | S | – | – |
| Frank Turner | Whitehorse, Yukon | 1984 | 14 | 13:20:37 | $600 |
| Frank Turner | Whitehorse, Yukon | 1985 | 16 | 12:22:08 | – |
| Frank Turner | Whitehorse, Yukon | 1986 | S | – | – |
| Frank Turner | Whitehorse, Yukon | 1987 | S | – | – |
| Frank Turner | Whitehorse, Yukon | 1988 | 12 | 14:12:15 | $1,350 |
| Frank Turner | Whitehorse, Yukon | 1989 | 10 | 13:04:28 | $1,750 |
| Frank Turner | Whitehorse, Yukon | 1990 | 19 | 14:02:04 | – |
| Frank Turner | Whitehorse, Yukon | 1991 | 11 | 11:23:34 | $1,700 |
| Frank Turner | Whitehorse, Yukon | 1992 | 6 | 12:07:06 | $4,054 |
| Frank Turner | Whitehorse, Yukon | 1993 | 10 | 12:05:20 | $3,400 |
| Frank Turner | Whitehorse, Yukon | 1994 | S | – | – |
| Frank Turner | Whitehorse, Yukon | 1995^{3} | 1^{†} | 10:16:20 | $15,000 |
| Frank Turner | Whitehorse, Yukon | 1996 | 5 | 13:03:28 | $7,000 |
| Frank Turner | Whitehorse, Yukon | 1997 | 2 | 12:07:03 | $24,000 |
| Frank Turner | Whitehorse, Yukon | 1998 | 5 | 12:01:25 | $8,000 |
| Frank Turner | Whitehorse, Yukon | 1999 | 5 | 11:19:38 | $8,000 |
| Frank Turner | Whitehorse, Yukon | 2000 | 3 | 11:03:27 | $18,000 |
| Frank Turner | Whitehorse, Yukon | 2001 | 6 | 12:04:57^{$} | $6,000 |
| Frank Turner | Whitehorse, Yukon | 2002 | S | – | – |
| Frank Turner | Whitehorse, Yukon | 2003 | 6^{@} | 11:18:02 | $6,000 |
| Frank Turner | Whitehorse, Yukon | 2004 | 5 | 11:19:08 | $8,000 |
| Frank Turner | Whitehorse, Yukon | 2005 | 7 | 11:18:20 | $5,000 |
| Frank Turner | Whitehorse, Yukon | 2008 | S | – | – |
| Saul Turner | Whitehorse, Yukon | 2006 | S | – | – |
| Luc Tweddell | Tagish, Yukon | 2009 | 14 | 12:04:35 | $3,500 |
| John Two Rivers | North Pole, Alaska | 1984 | S | – | – |
| Joar Leifseth Ulsom | Røros, Norway | 2012 | 6 | 10:08:51 | $10,545 |
| Wayne Valcq | Healy, Alaska | 1991 | S | – | – |
| Wayne Valcq | Healy, Alaska | 1993 | S | – | – |
| Nicholas Vanier | Villemurlin, France | 1997 | S | – | – |
| Nicholas Vanier | Villemurlin, France | 2003 | S | – | – |
| François Varigas | Dawson City, Yukon | 1986 | 16 | 14:20:21 | – |
| François Varigas | Dawson City, Yukon | 1987 | 7 | 13:04:29 | $1,900 |
| François Varigas | Dawson City, Yukon | 1988 | S | – | – |
| François Varigas | Dawson City, Yukon | 1989 | 7 | 12:02:36 | $2,800 |
| François Varigas | Dawson City, Yukon | 1990 | 3 | 12:00:32 | $10,000 |
| François Varigas | Dawson City, Yukon | 1991 | S | – | – |
| Roy Wade | Talkeetna, Alaska | 1993 | 24 | 14:07:30 | |
| Kelly Wages | Fairbanks, Alaska | 1987 | S | – | – |
| Roland Waldispuehl | Kriens, Switzerland | 1999 | S | – | – |
| Jim Wardlow | Delta Junction, Alaska | 1987 | 16 | 14:10:07 | – |
| Jim Wardlow | Delta Junction, Alaska | 1988 | 10 | 13:23:13 | $1,750 |
| Clint Warnke | Fairbanks, Alaska | 2011 | S | – | – |
| Rob Weathers | Salcha, Alaska | 1986 | S | – | – |
| Rob Weathers | Salcha, Alaska | 1987 | S | – | – |
| Martin Weiner | Denali Park, Alaska | 1986 | 13 | 14:18:46 | $700 |
| Jason Weitzel | Two Rivers, Alaska | 2012 | S | – | – |
| Abbie West | Fairbanks, Alaska | 2000 | S | – | – |
| Abbie West | Fairbanks, Alaska | 2010 | 9 | 10:09:45 | $6,480 |
| Abbie West | Fairbanks, Alaska | 2012 | 8 | 10:13:40 | $7,290 |
| Abbie West | Fairbanks, Alaska | 2013 | 8 | 10:07:54 | $4,860 |
| Alden West | Fairbanks, Alaska | 2003 | S | – | – |
| Chris Whaley | College, Alaska | 1984 | S | – | – |
| Susan Whiton | Trapper Creek, Alaska | 1987 | 12 | 13:16:01 | $800 |
| Thomas Wiget | Whitehorse, Yukon | 1996 | 16 | 15:18:09 | – |
| Thomas Wiget | Whitehorse, Yukon | 2000 | S | – | – |
| Buck Williams | King Salmon, Alaska | 2000 | S | – | – |
| Terry Williams | Fairbanks, Alaska | 2010 | S | – | – |
| Gerry Willomitzer | Shallow Bay, Yukon | 2004 | 12 | 12:14:17 | $2,500 |
| Gerry Willomitzer | Shallow Bay, Yukon | 2005 | 6 | 11:09:50^{$} | $6,000 |
| Gerry Willomitzer | Shallow Bay, Yukon | 2006 | 5 | 10:21:15 | $8,000 |
| Gerry Willomitzer | Shallow Bay, Yukon | 2007 | 3 | 10:12:09 | $22,000 |
| Gerry Willomitzer | Shallow Bay, Yukon | 2010 | S | – | – |
| Brian Wilmshurst | Dawson City, Yukon | 2012 | 16 | 12:12:03 | – |
| Brian Wilmshurst | Dawson City, Yukon | 2013 | 17 | 11:13:50 | – |
| Brian Wilmshurst | Dawson City, Yukon | 2014 | 10 | 13:03:18 | $4,271 |
| Jim Wilson | Ambler, Alaska | 1989 | 3 | 11:21:56 | $10,000 |
| Jim Wilson | Ambler, Alaska | 1991 | 10 | 11:18:04 | $2,100 |
| Jim Wilson | Ambler, Alaska | 1994 | 2 | 11:01:27 | $16,000 |
| Jim Wilson | Ambler, Alaska | 1995 | 2 | 10:17:09^{2} | $12,000 |
| Rick Wintter | Fairbanks, Alaska | 1990 | 20 | 15:21:52 | – |
| Rick Wintter | Fairbanks, Alaska | 1994 | 16 | 12:06:12 | $1,840 |
| Craig Wolter | Fairbanks, Alaska | 1987 | S | – | – |
| Amy Wright | Tok, Alaska | 1998 | 23 | 14:17 | – |
| Regina Wycoff | Healy, Alaska | 2006 | 11^{@} | 13:17:57 | $2,900 |
| Regina Wycoff | Healy, Alaska | 2007 | 18 | 13:07:27^{1} | – |
| Senley Yuill | Whitehorse, Yukon | 1984 | 12 | 13:03:08 | $800 |
| Ralf Zielinski | Germany | 1997 | 17 | 16:20:00^{1} | – |
| Peter Zimmerman | Whitehorse, Yukon | 1997 | S | – | – |
| Aliy Zirkle | Two Rivers, Alaska | 1998 | 17 | 13:21:40 | – |
| Aliy Zirkle | Two Rivers, Alaska | 1999 | 4^{@} | 11:19:17 | $12,000 |
| Aliy Zirkle | Two Rivers, Alaska | 2000 | 1^{†} | 10:22:57 | $30,000 |
| Dieter Zirngibl | Germany | 1995 | 13 | 14:20:20^{1} | – |
| Dieter Zirngibl | Germany | 1996 | 12 | 15:02:38 | – |
| Dieter Zirngibl | Germany | 2001 | S | – | – |

== Notes ==
- ^{a} Days, hours, minutes
- ^{b} Not adjusted for inflation
- ^{c} By the time Liss reached Braeburn, the Yukon River had melted, preventing further travel. Therefore, she was considered the last-place finisher despite not completing the entire course.
- ^{d} Sass suffered a severe concussion 12 miles (19 km) from the race's final checkpoint. He was withdrawn from the race by officials after activating his emergency beacon. He had been running minutes behind the race leader.
