= Aliy Zirkle =

American champion of sled dog racing (born 1970)

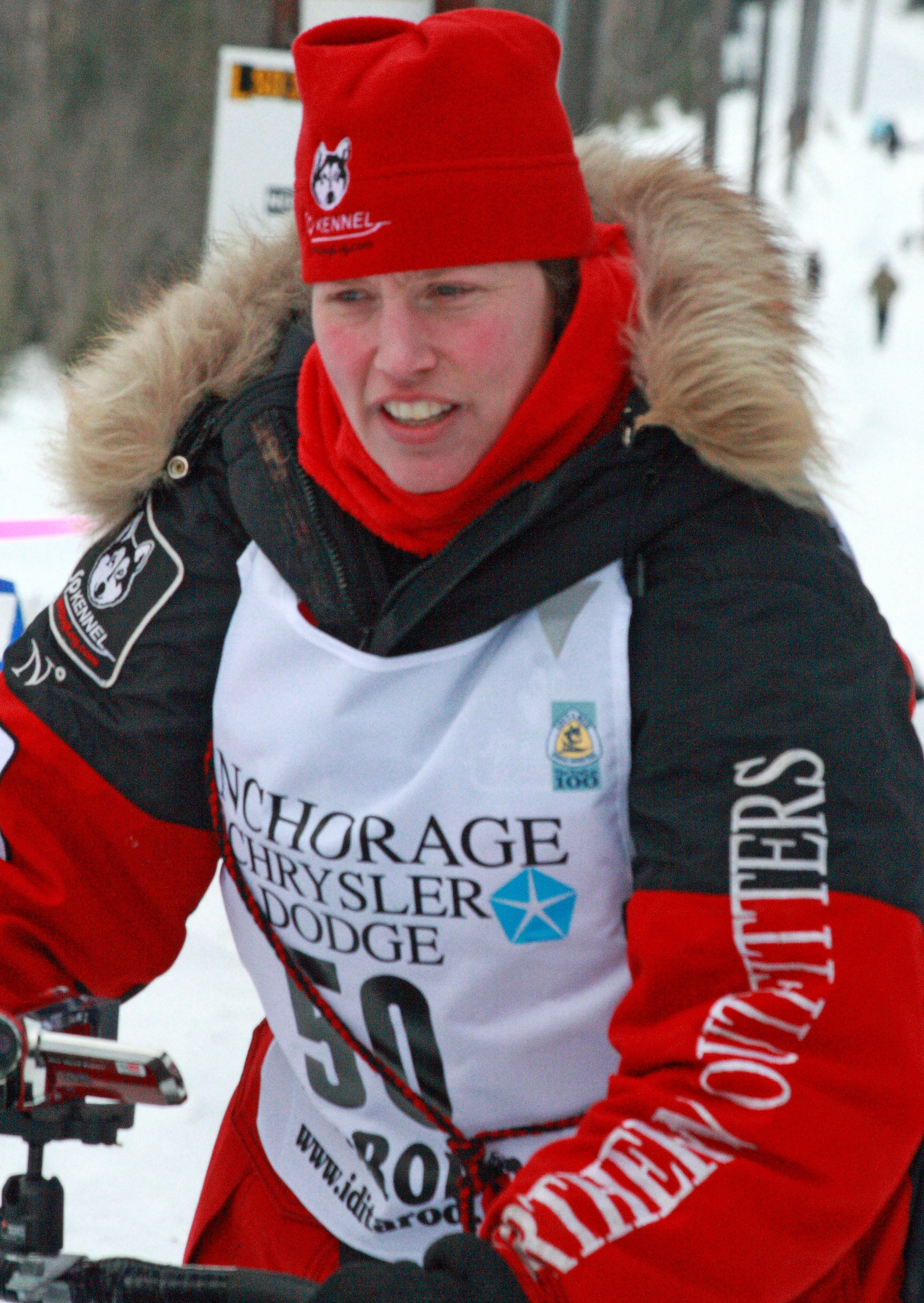
- Aliy Zirkle during the ceremonial start of the 2010 Iditarod.

Personal information
- Nationality: American
- Born: New Hampshire
- Occupation: Sled dog musher
- Spouse: Allen Moore

Aliy Zirkle (born 1970 in New Hampshire) is an American champion of sled dog racing.

Aliy Zirkle moved to Bettles, Alaska at age twenty and began mushing due to the remote nature of the town. She adopted six sled dogs and began learning how to race and train dogs. Aliy raced her first Yukon Quest in 1998 and her first Iditarod Trail Sled Dog Race in 2001. In 2000, she became the first woman to win the Yukon Quest, finishing the race with a time of 10 days, 22 hours and 57 minutes. Aliy has been the runner-up in the Iditarod three consecutive years, 2012, 2013, and 2014. Her best time in the Iditarod came in 2014, when she finished the race with a time of 8 days, 13 hours, 6 minutes and 41 seconds. Aliy has finished the Iditarod 14 times and the Yukon Quest 3 times. She has completed either the Yukon Quest or the Iditarod every year since 1998. Aliy also regularly competes in shorter dog sled races, such as the Two Rivers 100, the Copper Basin 300, and the Yukon Quest 300.

Aliy has received various awards throughout her mushing career, some of which were awarded to her by her fellow mushers. These awards include the Yukon Quest Challenge of the North award, given to the musher who "most exemplifies the spirit of the Yukon Quest, a spirit that compels one to challenge the country and win", and the Iditarod Leonhard Seppala Humanitarian Award for exemplary care of her dogs.

Aliy met fellow musher Allen Moore in 1998 and the two were married in 2005. Aliy has two step-daughters, Brigett and Jennifer, through Allen. Together Aliy and Allen run Skunk's Place (SP) Kennel in Two Rivers, Alaska. The kennel is named for Skunk, one of the six dogs Aliy adopted when she first moved to Alaska and began mushing.

During the 2016 Iditarod race, Zirkle and fellow competitor Jeff King were intentionally hit by a man on a snowmobile. He killed one of King's dogs.

She had announced that the 2021 Iditarod would be her 21st and last Iditarod race. Her husband, who had been the oldest musher to ever win the Yukon Quest, had retired a year earlier. In 2021, due to COVID-19 and weather conditions, the course was shortened. When Zirkle arrived at the Rohn checkpoint, she fell and had to be airlifted to Anchorage for a concussion and upper torso injuries, though suffered no broken bones.

== Race standings ==
Yukon Quest Results

Year	Finishing Place	Time	Prize winnings
1998	17	13d 21h 40m	--
1999	4	11d 19h 17m	$12,000
2000	1	10d 22h 57m	$30,000

Iditarod Results

Year	Finishing Place	Time	Prize winnings
2001	33	12d 17h 53m 33s	$1,049
2002	29	10d 28h 1m 45s	$1,571
2003	14	10d 17h 17m 38s	$14,857
2004	34	11d 2h 4m 44s	$1,049
2005	11	10d 1h 46m 30s	$26,111
2006	14	10d 0h 36m 50s	$25,000
2007	28	10d 19h 57m 7s	$3,600
2008	21	10d 7h 10m 21s	$15,000
2009	17	11d 2h 28m 45s	$10,800
2010	16	9d 18h 5m 10s	$14,100
2011	11	9d 10h 22m 31s	$20,600
2012	2	9d 5h 29m 10s	$46,500
2013	2	9d 8h 3m 35s	$47,100
2014	2	8d 13h 6m 41s	$47,600
2015	5	9d 4h 44m 25s	$44,300
2016	3	8d 18h 42m 36s	$57,750
2017	8	8d 22h 49m 42s	$33,700
2018	15	10d 6h 42m 22s	$14,912
2019	4	10d 2h 26m 56s	$35,843
2020	18	10d 7h 28m 30s	$12,661
2021	Scratched, Rohn		

=== 2014 Iditarod Record ===
Check Points	Position in	Date	Time in	#Dogs in	Layover (24)(8)		Date out	Time out	#Dogs out	Dropped dogs
Anchorage	9	--	--	--	--	--	3/1	10:17 pm	12	--
Willow	9	--	--	--	--	--	3/2	2:16 pm	16	--
Yenta	5	3/2	6:04 pm	16	--	--	3/2	6:07 pm	16	--
Skwenta	16	3/2	9:09 pm	16	--	--	3/3	1:50 am	15	1
Finger Lake	5	3/3	5:04 am	15	--	--	3/3	5:06 am	15	--
Rainy Pass	7	3/3	8:23 am	15	--	--	3/3	1:32 pm	15	--
Rohn	2	3/3	5:12 pm	15	--	--	3/3	5:22 pm	15	--
Nikola	3	3/4	7:34 am	15	--	--	3/4	11:22 am	15	--
Mcgrath	1	3/4	4:53 pm	15	--	--	3/4	4:54 pm	15	--
Takotna	1	3/4	7:06 pm	15	24	--	3/5	9:06 pm	15	--
Ophir	9	3/5	11:06 pm	15	--	--	3/5	11:23 pm	15	--
Cripple	4	3/6	11:45 am	15	--	--	3/6	11:56 am	15	--
Ruby	1	3/7	12:09 am	15	--	8	3/7	12:18 am	14	1
Galena	3	3/7	6:10 am	14	--	--	3/7	2:16 pm	14	--
Nulato	2	3/7	5:38 pm	14	--	--	3/7	9:34 pm	12	2
Kaltag	1	3/8	3:11 am	12	--	--	3/8	3:18 am	11	1
Unalakeet	1	3/8	4:34 pm	11	--	--	3/8	8:48 pm	11	--
Sharktoolik	1	3/9	3:51 am	11	--	--	3/9	7:12 am	11	--
Koyuk	1	3/9	2:07 pm	11	--	--	3/9	5:51 pm	11	--
Elim	2	3/9	11:47 pm	11	--	--	3/10	1:01 am	11	--
White Mountain	2	3/10	7:59 am	11	--	--	3/10	4:00 pm	11	--
Safety	2	3/10	10:57 pm	11	--	--	3/11	1:01 am	10	1
Nome	2	3/11	4:06 am	10	--	--	--	--	--	--

== Awards ==
Year	Award	Associated Race
1999	Spirit of the North	Yukon Quest
2005	Leonhard Seppala Humanitarian	Iditarod
2011	Leonhard Seppala Humanitarian	Iditarod
2012	Spirit of Alaska	Iditarod
2012	Alaska Gold Coast	Iditarod
2014	Fish First	Iditarod
2014	Alaska Gold Coast	Iditarod
2016	Leonhard Seppala Humanitarian	Iditarod
2018	Leonhard Seppala Humanitarian	Iditarod
2019	GCI Dorothy G. Page Halfway	Iditarod
2019	Leonhard Seppala Humanitarian	Iditarod

== See also ==
- List of Yukon Quest competitors
- List of sled dog races
