= Dick Mackey =

American dog musher

Dick Mackey is an American dog musher who won the 1,049-mile Iditarod Trail Sled Dog Race across the U.S. state of Alaska in 1978 by the closest margin in the history of the event. His son, Rick Mackey, became the first legacy winner when he won the race in 1983. Dick's other son, Lance Mackey, won four consecutive Iditarods in 2007, 2008, 2009 and 2010, thus becoming the second legacy winner.

== Overview ==
In 1978, Mackey pulled ahead of Rick Swenson during the last leg of the race from Point Safety to Nome. With less than 10 miles (16 km) to go, Mackey had a 2-mile (3-km) lead, but by the time he reached the chute to the finish line along Front Street in Nome, they were neck-and-neck. While Swenson crossed the burled arch at the finish line first, Mackey had eight dogs in harness, and Swenson had only six. Since the nose of Mackey's lead dog crossed the finish line first, Marshall Myron Gavin decided in favor of Mackey. Swenson initially believed he had won, and when he learned otherwise he told Gavin, "if you made a decision, stick by it". (Sherwonit, 1991, pg. 134)

Mackey's winning time was 14 days, 18 hours, 52 minutes, and 24 seconds, and his lead dogs were named Skipper and Shrew. Mackey competed in every Iditarod from the first in 1973 until his victory.

He later established a truck stop in Coldfoot, Alaska.
