= Lance Mackey =

American dog musher (1970–2022)

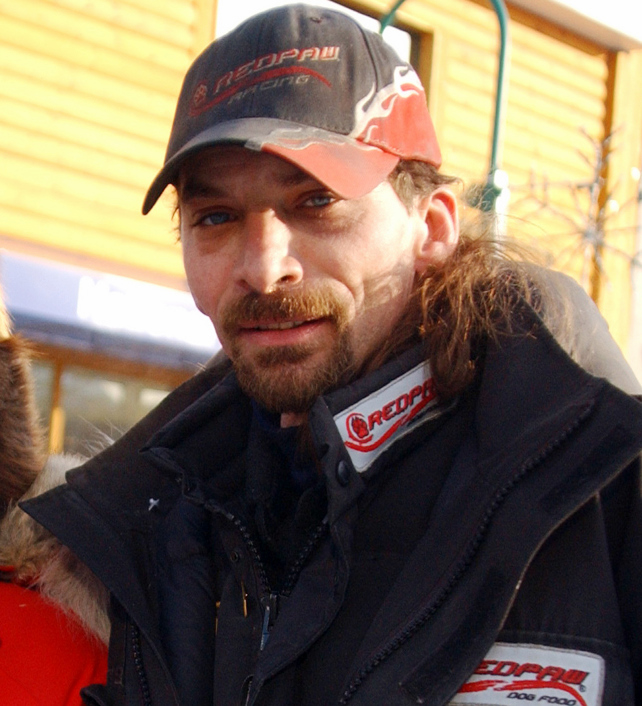
- Mackey at the 2009 Iditarod Race

Personal information
- Born: June 2, 1970 Anchorage, Alaska, U.S.
- Died: September 7, 2022 (aged 52)
- Website: Lance Mackey's Comeback Kennel

Sport
- Sport: Dogsled racing
- Event: Iditarod Trail Sled Dog Race

Lance Mackey (June 2, 1970 – September 7, 2022) was an American dog musher and dog sled racer from Fairbanks, Alaska. Mackey was a four-time winner of both the 1,000-mile (1,600 km) Yukon Quest and the Iditarod Trail Sled Dog Race.

== Early life ==
Lance was born on June 2, 1970, in Anchorage into a family of sled dog mushers. His father, Dick Mackey, was one of the founders of the Iditarod Trail Sled Dog Race, and won the event by a one second margin over Rick Swenson in 1978. Lance's half-brother Rick Mackey also won the Iditarod Trail Sled Dog Race in 1983. All three of them won the race on their sixth attempt while wearing bib number 13.

Mackey raced from the time he was a child; his father recalls building a sled for Lance as soon as he was old enough to hold on and then, watching him enter and win his very first race. However, technically speaking, Mackey's first race was from the comfort of his mother's womb, as she placed fourth in the Women's North American Championships while seven months pregnant with Lance.

Mackey's parents divorced at a young age. As a teenager, Lance reports being arrested multiple times for various charges. After living with her for some time, his mother eventually sent Lance to live with his father at the Coldfoot Truck stop. From there, Lance transitioned into a life as a fisherman before eventually returning to his calling as a dog sled musher.

== Career ==
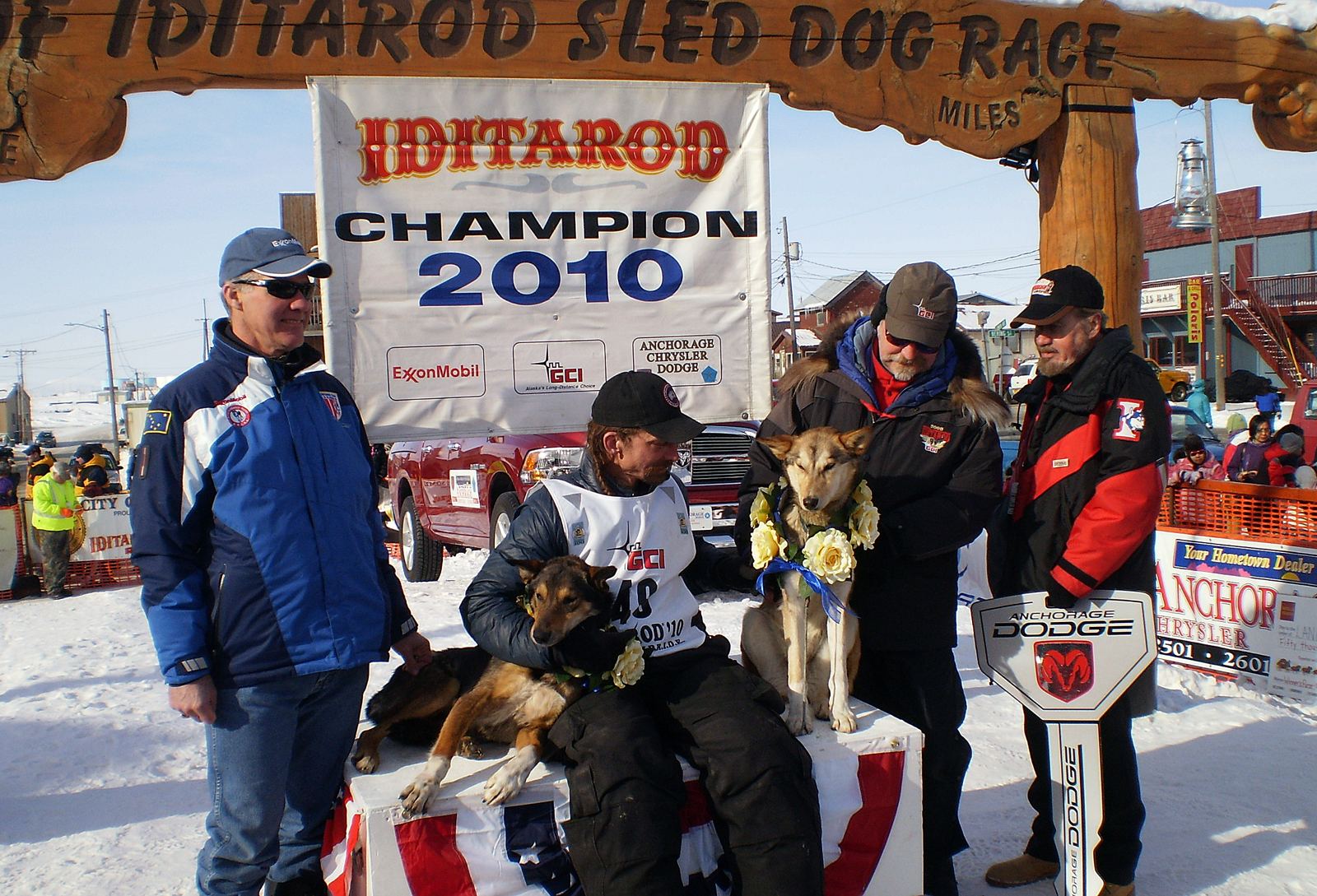
Lance Mackey following his 2010 Iditarod Win

Lance Mackey's career as a sled dog musher began with his first appearance in the 2001 Iditarod–placing 36th out of the 57 who finished the race and winning a mere $1046.00. By 2007, Mackey had quickly moved up the ranks to become the first person to win both the Yukon Quest and Iditarod in the same year. Mackey continued to set high standards: in 2008, he won the Tustumena 200, followed by his fourth consecutive Yukon Quest win and his second Iditarod win. While he chose not to run the Yukon Quest the next year, Lance captured his third consecutive Iditarod in 2009. In 2010, Mackey rejoined the fray, finishing second in the Yukon Quest and also securing his 4th consecutive Iditarod win before sliding out of the top ten in the 2011 race, much to the dismay of multiple news reporters. After his 2010 win, Mackey was unable to secure a position in the top 10 Iditarod finishers despite five different attempts. On May 7, 2020, the Iditarod announced that due to a failed drug test, Lance Mackey's 21st-place finish at the 2020 Iditarod would be vacated. Mackey's urine sample taken in White Mountain, a standard operating procedure for the first thirty mushers arriving at the checkpoint, tested positive for methamphetamine. After this setback, Mackey did not participate in the 2021 Iditarod.

== Kennel practices and dogs ==
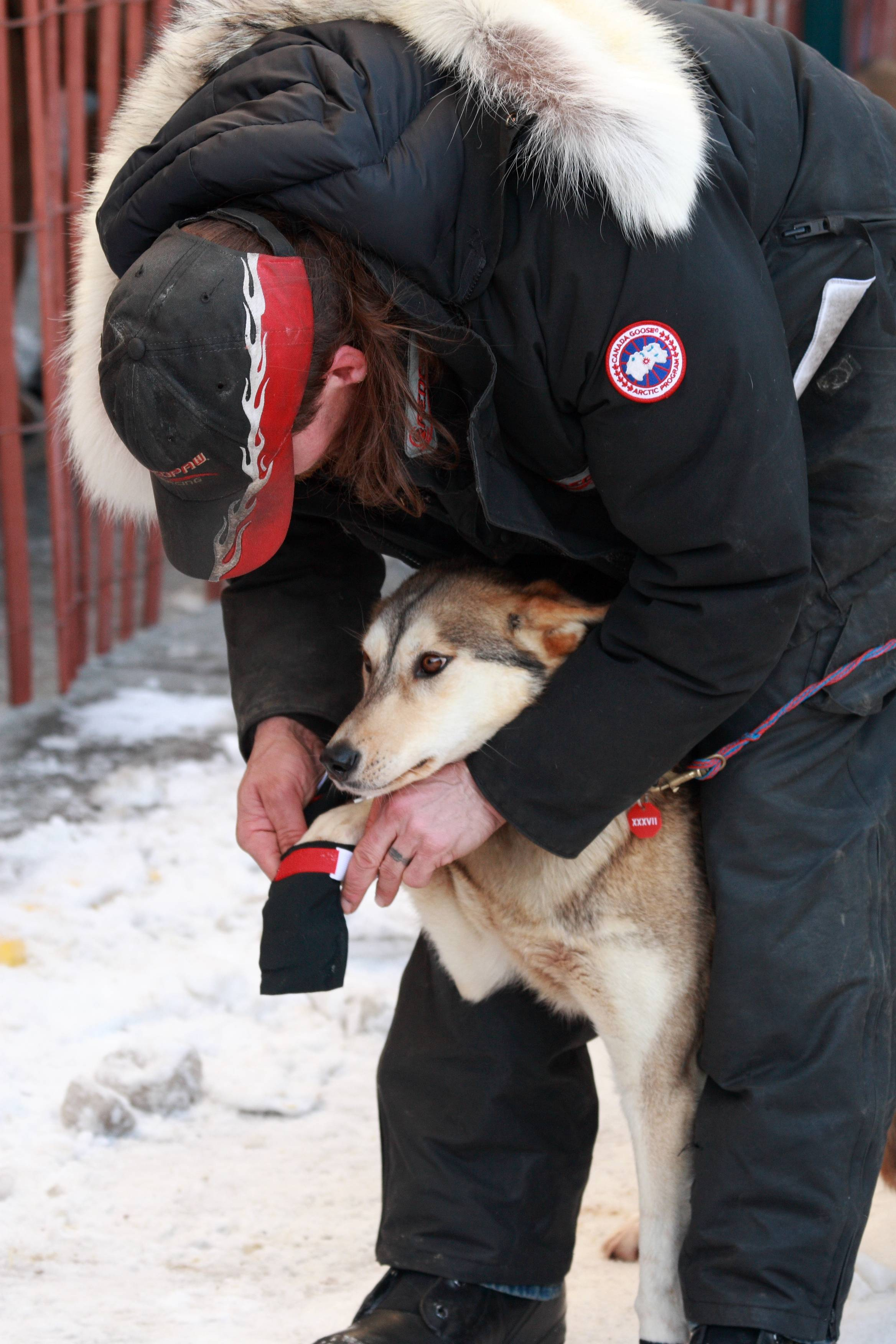
2009, the 37th running of The Last Great Race

Mackey ran his kennel "Comeback Kennel" on a 5 acre plot of land near Fairbanks, Alaska. The sixty some dogs that he maintained have bloodlines dating back to one of his most legendary dogs, "Zorro." Zorro was born in 2000 and at one point, Mackey's entire team was composed of Zorro's offspring. Unfortunately, Zorro's career was cut short after a snow-machine accident during the 2008 All-Alaskan Sweepstakes. While Zorro survived and regained the use of his legs after months of treatment, including acupuncture and physical therapy, he was unable to compete again.

Some of Mackey's practices at his kennel were criticized publicly, particularly the use of CBD treatment for his dogs. In response to criticism, Mackey defended his methods of care and argues that the use of CBD for sled dogs helps speed their recovery time. PETA criticized Mackey in a public statement claiming the cruelty of dog racing. Their public criticism followed the death of two of Lance's dogs due to unknown causes during the 2015 Iditarod.

== Personal life ==
Mackey was diagnosed with throat cancer in 2001. Despite this, he did not let his diagnosis impede his career and entered the 2002 Iditarod race. However, he would not finish that race. Due to complications from his cancer treatment, including a feeding tube, Mackey was forced to scratch from that race and take a full year off from racing to recover. After radiation treatment that led to the degradation of his teeth, his cancer was deemed in remission. Cancer is not the only ailment that challenged Mackey. He also suffered from Raynaud's syndrome, a condition often triggered by cold. This syndrome, which caused immense pain in Mackey's finger, led him to voluntarily have his left index finger amputated.

In his personal life, Mackey openly struggled with addiction. After testing positive for methamphetamine during the 2020 Iditarod, Lance announced he would be checking himself into rehab. He has also previously spoken about his struggles with cocaine and alcohol.

Mackey has been married three times and divorced twice. On October 4, 2020, Mackey's partner, Jenne Smith, died in an ATV accident. Mackey and Smith had parented two children, Atigun and Lozen, who were both under the age of five at the time of the fatal accident.

Mackey died of throat cancer on September 7, 2022, at the age of 52.

== Honors and accomplishments ==
Asteroid 43793 Mackey, discovered by Carolyn Shoemaker and David H. Levy at Palomar Observatory in 1990, was named in his honor.

Mackey was the subject of a 2015 independent feature-length film called The Great Alone, a documentary following his life story and career. In 2022, Matrix Media released Wild life - the Lance Mackey Story after following and living with the Mackey family. The film won numerous awards at international festivals.

In 2010, Lance was publicly recognized by U.S. Senator Lisa Murkowski on his fourth consecutive Iditarod win and acknowledged his determination and perseverance in both his personal and professional matters.
