= Jeff King (musher) =

American sled dog racer (born 1956)

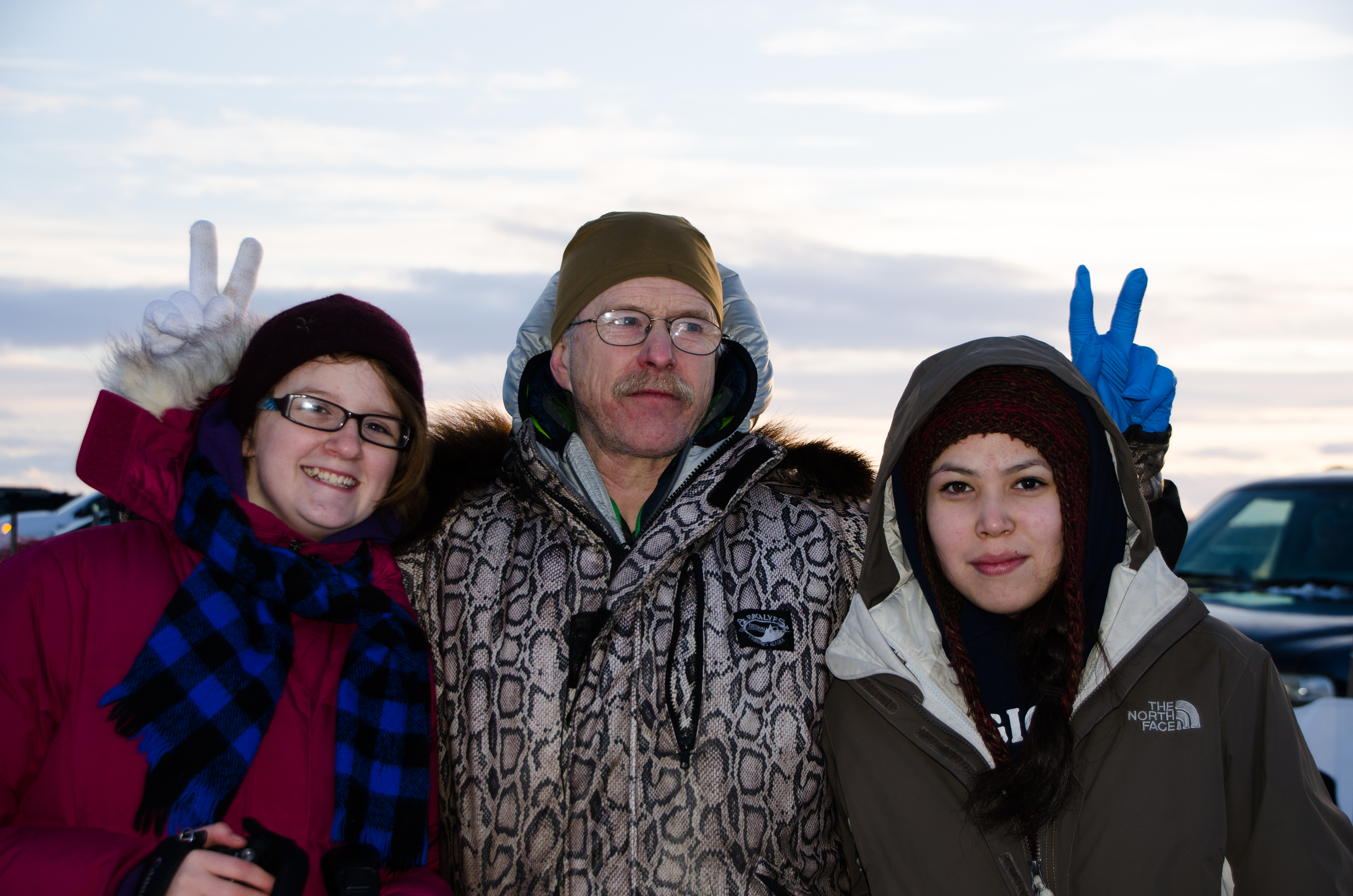
- Jeff King (center) posing for photos with spectators during the 2013 Kuskokwim 300.
- Born: 1956 (age 69–70); North Fork, California, United States
- Occupation: Dog musher
- Spouse: Donna Gates (?–2011)
- Children: 3

Jeff King (born 1956) is an American musher and sled dog racer. He is generally credited with introducing the sit-down sled which has largely replaced the standing sled traditionally used by distance mushers.

== Early life ==
King was born and raised in California.

== Mushing career ==
King moved to Alaska in 1975 and began racing in 1976. He won the Yukon Quest in 1989, and the Iditarod Trail Sled Dog Race in 1993, 1996, 1998, and, at age 50, the 2006 Iditarod, making him the oldest musher to have ever won the event, a distinction he held until 2017, when Mitch Seavey won at age 57. King ran the 2022 Iditarod, his 30th, but not the 2023 race. During the 2016 Iditarod race, King and fellow competitor Aliy Zirkle were assaulted by an intoxicated man on a snowmobile. The snowmobile struck King's team, killing one of his dogs.

King's "Idita-Rider" -- a person who rides in the front storage compartment for the ceremonial start of the race -- for the 2005 Iditarod was a child sponsored by the Make-a-Wish Foundation.

King has also won many other sled dog races. He has a kennel, Husky Homestead, near the entrance of Denali National Park. As of 2023 he was still racing.

King was inducted into the Iditarod Hall of Fame in 1999. He was inducted into the Alaska Sports Hall of Fame in 2017.

=== Mentoring ===
King mentored Amanda Otto while she competed in her first races of Husky Homestead dogs in the Copper Basin 300, the Willow 300, and the Alpine 200 in 2021 to qualify for the Iditarod. Otto raced in the Iditarod for the first time in 2022, finishing 27th of 49 entries. In 2023 Otto placed second in the Yukon Quest Alaska, finishing in 4 days, 11 hours, and 17 minutes. Her team was in such good condition at the end of the race, still yelping and pulling, that she was awarded the Humanitarian Award by the race veterinary team in the first unanimous decision in race history.

== Innovations ==
In the early 2000s King developed a sled with a seat for the musher, which he used in the 2004 Iditarod for the first time; he became so comfortable that he fell asleep and fell off the sled. His version of a sit-down sled was widely adopted by other distance mushers. He also developed a method of heating the musher's handlebar and an exercise wheel similar in design to a hamster wheel for dogs.

== Personal life ==
King has three daughters with his former wife, Donna Gates. The couple divorced in 2011.

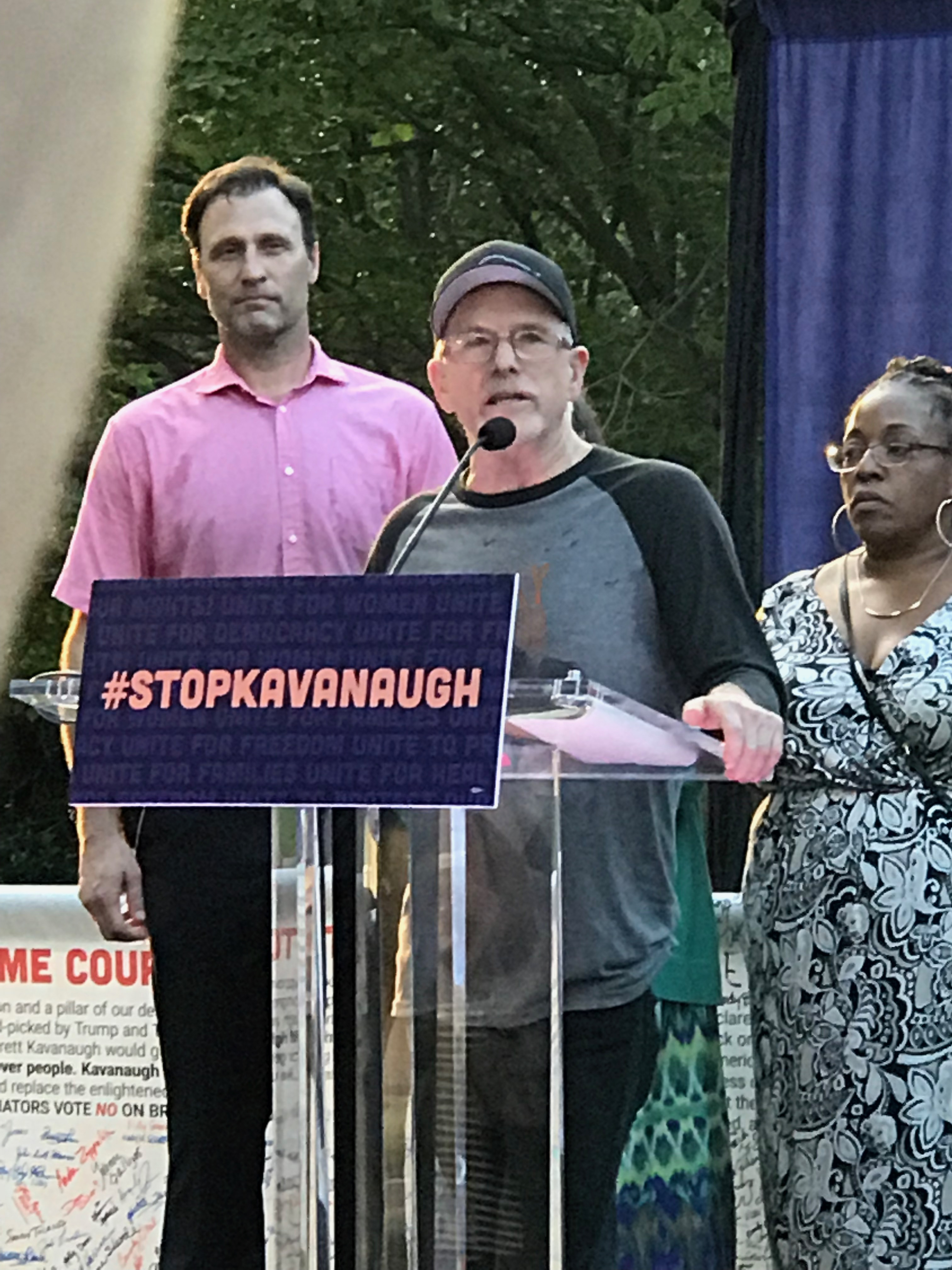
Jeff King speaking at a Stop Kavanaugh Rally on the US Capitol Grounds, September 4, 2018

== Victories ==
- Iditarod (4 times): 1993, 1996, 1998, 2006
- Yukon Quest: 1989
- Kuskokwim 300 (9): 1991, 1992, 1993, 1997, 2001, 2002, 2003, 2006 and 2013
- Copper Basin 300 (2): 1995, 2010
- Tustumena 200 (3): 2000
