= Rick Swenson =

American dog musher

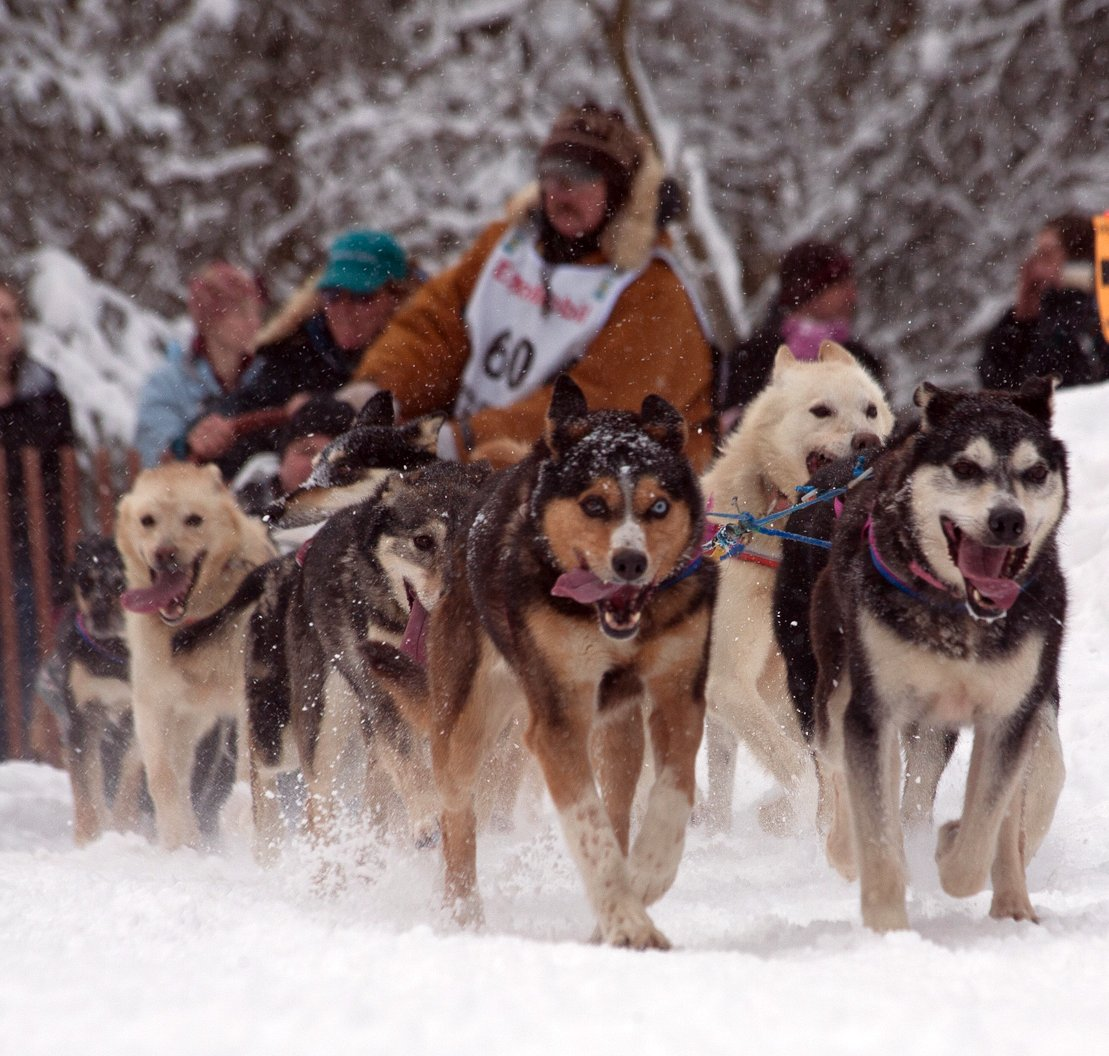
- Rick Swenson at the beginning of the 2012 Iditarod

Personal information
- Nickname: "King of the Iditarod"
- Nationality: American
- Born: 1950 (age 75–76) Willmar, Minnesota
- Home town: Two Rivers, Alaska
- Years active: 1976-2012

Sport
- Sport: Dog mushing
- Event: Iditarod Trail Sled Dog Race

Rick Swenson, sometimes known as the "King of the Iditarod", (born 1950 in Willmar, Minnesota), is an American dog musher who was first to win the 1,049-mile (1688.2 km) Iditarod Trail Sled Dog Race across the U.S. state of Alaska five times, a record he held for 30 years, until Dallas Seavey matched it by winning the 2021 Iditarod. Swenson won in 1977, 1979, 1981, 1982, and 1991, and is the only person to win in three separate decades. He won his first Iditarod race at the age of 27.

Swenson competed in the Iditarod for the first time in 1976, placing 12th. The next year, he beat Jerry Riley by just 4 minutes and 52 seconds, and became known for close finishes. Swenson has won by less than an hour four times, and by less than five minutes twice. Between 1976 and 2012, he has entered the race 36 times and has completed 34 Iditarods, more than any other musher, finished in the top ten 24 times and has won $612,576 in prizes, third among all entrants. He was awarded Sportsmanship awards in 1983 and 1996, and the Leonhard Seppala Humanitarian award for dog care twice, in 1992 and 2004.

The most controversial finish in the history of the Iditarod is his 1978 loss to Dick Mackey. Swenson believed he had won—he personally crossed the finish line before Mackey. But Mackey had more dogs and a longer harness, and the nose of his lead dog crossed the finish line in 14 days, 18 hours, 52 minutes, and 24 seconds, one second ahead of the nose of Swenson's lead dog.

Swenson moved to Alaska in 1973 to run sled dogs. He lived first in Eureka, then moved to Two Rivers in the late 1980s. He has been a fur trapper, gold prospector, and is currently a kennel owner. He also enjoys woodworking and is the father of three children. He is a member of the Alaska Miner Association, Two Rivers Mushing Association, and is on the board of directors of the Iditarod Trail Committee, which manages the race. As of 2012, he has stopped competing in the Iditarod.
