= Two Rivers, Alaska =

- CDP
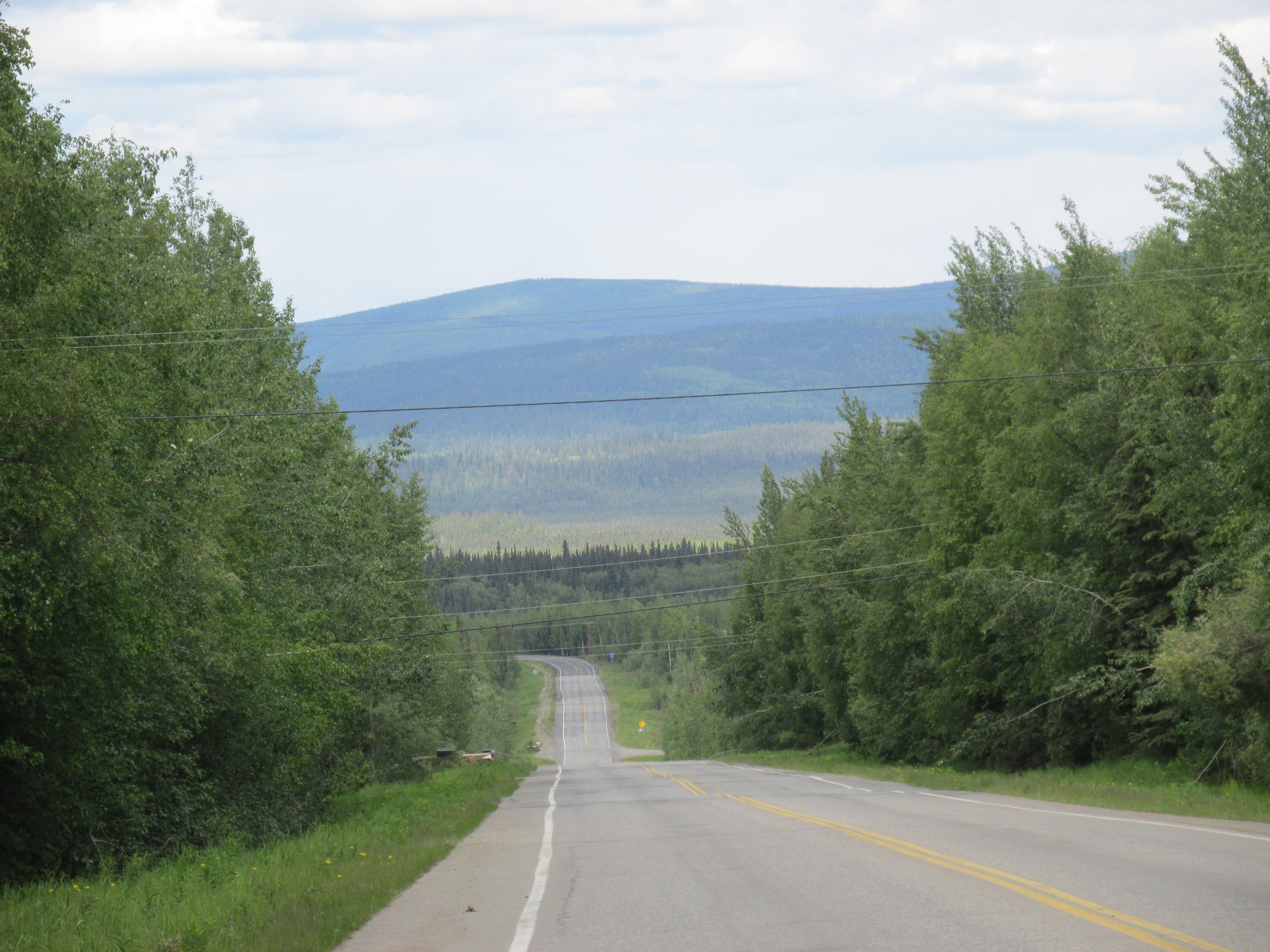
- Chena Hot Springs Road at mile 14 (km 22), looking westbound and downhill with the Little Chena River valley at the bottom.

- Location within Fairbanks North Star Borough and the state of Alaska
- Coordinates: 64°51′45″N 147°5′56″W
- Country: United States
- State: Alaska
- Borough: Fairbanks North Star

Government
  - Borough mayor: Bryce J. Ward
  - State senator: Robert Myers (R)
  - State rep.: Frank Tomaszewski (R)

Area
  - Total: 27.68 sq mi (71.68 km^{2})
  - Land: 27.68 sq mi (71.68 km^{2})
  - Water: 0 sq mi (0.00 km^{2})

Population (2020)
  - Total: 650
  - Density: 23.5/sq mi (9.07/km^{2})
- Time zone: UTC-9 (Alaska (AKST))
  - Summer (DST): UTC-8 (AKDT)
- ZIP code: 99716
- Area code: 907
- FIPS code: 02-79830

Two Rivers is a census-designated place (CDP) in Fairbanks North Star Borough, Alaska, United States. It lies between mile 13 (the Little Chena River) and mile 25 (the Chena River) on the Chena Hot Springs Road, northeast of Fairbanks. As of the 2020 census, Two Rivers had a population of 650.

== Demographics ==
Historical population
Census	Pop.	Note	%±
1980	359		—
1990	453		26.2%
2000	482		6.4%
2010	719		49.2%
2020	650		−9.6%
U.S. Decennial Census

Two Rivers first appeared on the 1980 U.S. Census as a census-designated place (CDP).

As of the census of 2000, there were 482 people, 177 households, and 124 families residing in the CDP. The population density was 16.9 inhabitants per square mile (6.5/km^{2}). There were 192 housing units at an average density of 6.7 per square mile (2.6/km^{2}). The racial makeup of the CDP was 88.59% White, 0.21% Black or African American, 2.70% Native American, 2.49% Asian, 0.83% from other races, and 5.19% from two or more races. 1.24% of the population were Hispanic or Latino of any race.

There were 177 households, out of which 40.7% had children under the age of 18 living with them, 59.9% were married couples living together, 6.2% had a female householder with no husband present, and 29.9% were non-families. 24.9% of all households were made up of individuals, and 1.7% had someone living alone who was 65 years of age or older. The average household size was 2.72 and the average family size was 3.19.

In the CDP the population was spread out, with 31.1% under the age of 18, 6.2% from 18 to 24, 34.6% from 25 to 44, 26.6% from 45 to 64, and 1.5% who were 65 years of age or older. The median age was 34 years. For every 100 females there were 120.1 males. For every 100 females age 18 and over, there were 119.9 males.

The median income for a household in the CDP was $58,571, and the median income for a family was $58,661. Males had a median income of $45,500 versus $21,736 for females. The per capita income for the CDP was $24,351. None of the families and none of the population were living below the poverty line, including no under eighteens and none of those over 64.

== Economy ==
Most Two Rivers residents who are not self-employed work in Fairbanks, North Pole or the area's military installations, Eielson Air Force Base and Fort Wainwright. Businesses in Two Rivers include one general store, restaurants, a post office, a laundromat and the former HIPAS Observatory, which closed in 2011.

Most people who move to Two Rivers are attracted by the rural nature of the community and the extensive network of trails in the area. The trail system is popular with dog sled mushers, horseback, snowmachine, motorcycle and ATV riders, hunters, hikers, and others. Two Rivers borders the extensive Chena River State Recreation Area.

Two Rivers is especially popular with both recreational and professional dog sled mushers. Sled dogs outnumber humans in Two Rivers by about 4 to 1. Notable Two Rivers mushers include 5-time Iditarod Trail Sled Dog Race Champion Rick Swenson, the first Yukon Quest International Sled Dog Race champion, Sonny Lindner, and only woman to win that race, Aliy Zirkle (2000) and her husband Allen Moore who won the 2013 Yukon Quest making them the only husband and wife team to have both won the race. In February, Two Rivers hosts a checkpoint for the Yukon Quest.

== Geography and climate ==
Two Rivers is located at 64°51′45″N 147°5′56″W (64.862366, -147.098884).

According to the United States Census Bureau, the CDP has a total area of 28.5 square miles (74 km^{2}), all of it land.

Two Rivers has a subarctic climate (Dfc) showing signs of seasonal lead, with June being warmer than August and May being warmer than September. Summers are warm and rainy, coupled with cool nights, while winters are severely cold and snowy, with annual snowfall averaging 62 inches (157 cm).

Climate data for Two Rivers, Alaska (1991–2020 normals, extremes 1992–2017)
Month	Jan	Feb	Mar	Apr	May	Jun	Jul	Aug	Sep	Oct	Nov	Dec	Year
Record high °F (°C)	58 (14)	49 (9)	59 (15)	77 (25)	88 (31)	91 (33)	92 (33)	89 (32)	77 (25)	74 (23)	50 (10)	47 (8)	92 (33)
Mean daily maximum °F (°C)	6.2 (−14.3)	17.6 (−8.0)	28.5 (−1.9)	48.5 (9.2)	64.6 (18.1)	74.1 (23.4)	74.5 (23.6)	67.6 (19.8)	56.1 (13.4)	35.6 (2.0)	15.6 (−9.1)	8.7 (−12.9)	41.5 (5.3)
Daily mean °F (°C)	−3.4 (−19.7)	6.5 (−14.2)	14.9 (−9.5)	35.3 (1.8)	49.4 (9.7)	59.6 (15.3)	62.0 (16.7)	55.9 (13.3)	45.3 (7.4)	27.0 (−2.8)	6.8 (−14.0)	−0.5 (−18.1)	29.9 (−1.2)
Mean daily minimum °F (°C)	−12.9 (−24.9)	−4.5 (−20.3)	1.4 (−17.0)	22.1 (−5.5)	34.2 (1.2)	45.2 (7.3)	49.4 (9.7)	44.2 (6.8)	34.4 (1.3)	18.3 (−7.6)	−1.9 (−18.8)	−9.7 (−23.2)	18.4 (−7.6)
Record low °F (°C)	−55 (−48)	−59 (−51)	−36 (−38)	−22 (−30)	5 (−15)	22 (−6)	30 (−1)	27 (−3)	14 (−10)	−27 (−33)	−45 (−43)	−52 (−47)	−59 (−51)
Average precipitation inches (mm)	0.55 (14)	0.57 (14)	0.39 (9.9)	0.40 (10)	1.02 (26)	2.41 (61)	3.19 (81)	3.13 (80)	1.95 (50)	0.88 (22)	0.73 (19)	0.59 (15)	15.81 (402)
Average snowfall inches (cm)	10.5 (27)	6.9 (18)	6.0 (15)	2.1 (5.3)	0.7 (1.8)	0.0 (0.0)	0.0 (0.0)	0.0 (0.0)	1.4 (3.6)	12.1 (31)	12.7 (32)	9.0 (23)	61.4 (156)
Average precipitation days	8.6	7.0	5.6	1.8	0.2	0.0	0.0	0.0	1.0	9.1	10.1	8.7	52.1
Source 1: NOAA
Source 2: WRCC
