= 2026 Iditarod =

Sled-dog race in Alaska, USA

2026 Iditarod at the 54th Annual Iditarod Trail Sled Dog Race
- Venue: Iditarod Trail
- Location: Alaska
- Dates: March 2026
- Competitors: 34 from 5 nations
- Winning time: 9d 7h 32m 51s
- Total prize money: $650,000

Champion
- Jessie Holmes

The 2026 Iditarod is the 54th year of the Iditarod Trail Sled Dog Race, an annual sled dog race in the U.S. state of Alaska. It began on March 7, 2026. Contestants include Ryan Redington, and 2019 Iditarod champion Peter Kaiser (musher). Prior to the beginning of the race 5 mushers withdrew. The race took place on the northern route of the raceway. The 2025 race champion musher Jessie Holmes won the race on Tuesday, March 17, 2026, reaching Nome in 9 days 7 hours and 32 minutes. Holmes is the sixth musher to consecutivly win the Iditarod.
