= 2020 Iditarod =

Sled-dog race in Alaska, USA

48th Annual Iditarod Trail Sled Dog Race
- Venue: Iditarod Trail
- Location: Alaska
- Dates: March 7–18, 2020
- Competitors: 58

Champion
- Thomas Waerner

The 2020 Iditarod is the 48th iteration of the Iditarod Trail Sled Dog Race in Alaska. The race began on Saturday, March 7, 2020, in Anchorage, Alaska and was won by Thomas Waerner on March 18, in Nome. There was 58 mushers signed up to participate, including former champions and noted racers Robert Bundtzen, Martin Buser, Peter Kaiser, Lance Mackey, Nicolas Petit, Mitch Seavey, Joar Leifseth Ulsom, and Aliy Zirkle. The race started before Alaska's first coronavirus case on March 13, and after that incident, checkpoints were relocated or eliminated and gathering in Nome for the finish was discouraged.
