= 2021 Iditarod =

Sled-dog race in Alaska, USA

49th Annual Iditarod Trail Sled Dog Race
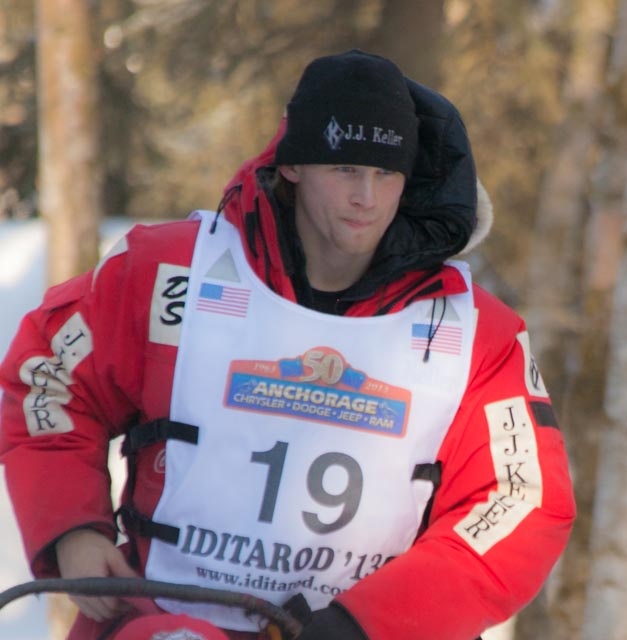
- Dallas Seavey in 2013
- Venue: Iditarod Trail
- Location: Alaska
- Dates: March 7–18, 2021
- Competitors: 46

Champion
- Dallas Seavey

The 2021 Iditarod was the 49th edition of the Iditarod Trail Sled Dog Race in Alaska. The race began on Sunday, March 7, 2021, in Anchorage, Alaska. 46 mushers participated in the race including past winners and noted racers Aliy Zirkle, Martin Buser, Dallas Seavey, Peter Kaiser, Joar Leifseth Ulsom, and Nicolas Petit.

The 2021 Iditarod was won by Dallas Seavey, who finished on March 15 with a total race time of 7 days, 14 hours, 8 minutes, and 57 seconds. Aaron Burmeister and Brent Sass finished second and third, respectively. This was Seavey's fifth time winning the race.

== Race format ==
On February 5, 2021, the race officials announced they had canceled the ceremonial start in Anchorage, which usually is an 11-mile (18 km) route through the city. Rather than restart at the usual checkpoint of Willow Lake, the 2021 race restarted at Deshka Landing in the Susitna Valley because of COVID-19 restrictions.

Normally on odd-numbered years, the Iditarod races along the southern race route. However, because of the pandemic, the Iditarod Trail Committee decided to put together a new route, called the Iditarod Golden Trail Loop. The route utilizes portions of the traditional southern route up the checkpoint at the town of Iditarod, then goes to the ghost town of Flat, which serves as a turnaround point. The rest of the route is then run back along preexisting trail, ending in the town of Willow. It is noted this route will require entrants to go through the Dalzell Gorge and Farewell Burn twice, two notorious sections of the route near the Alaska Range. No previous race route has attempted to traverse the Range twice, or backwards from a normal route. The 2021 race rules require the mandatory 24 hour layover, which is used to equalize the time differences in starting positions, to be used at or before the Iditarod checkpoint. The first of two mandatory eight hour layovers can be taken between Rohn checkpoint and the return to there, and the final layover will be taken at the town of Skwenta.

Mushers were required to wear face masks, with strict social distancing measures.
