= 2023 Iditarod =

Sled-dog race in Alaska, USA

51st Annual Iditarod Trail Sled Dog Race
- Venue: Iditarod Trail
- Location: Alaska
- Dates: March 4, 2023–March 17, 2023
- Competitors: 33

Champion
- Ryan Redington

The 2023 Iditarod was the 51st edition of the Iditarod, an annual sled dog race in the U.S. state of Alaska. It began on March 4, 2023, with a ceremonial 11-mile (18 km) start in Anchorage, Alaska. The official 1,000-mile (1,600 km) race began the following day in Willow, Alaska, and ended 9 to 10 days later in Nome, Alaska. It used the southern route of the Iditarod Trail for the first time since the 2019 edition.

The 2023 race had 33 mushers, the smallest field of competitors in its history; the decline in participants was attributed to financial issues following the COVID-19 pandemic and an ongoing inflation surge. The field included reigning champion Brent Sass and 2019 champion Peter Kaiser. Ryan Redington, the grandson of Iditarod Race co-founder Joe Redington, won for the first time with a time of 8 days, 21 hours, 12 minutes, and 58 seconds. A total of 29 teams finished the race—the last arrived on March 17 to earn the Red Lantern award.
