= Kuskokwim 300 =

Annual mid-distance dogsled race

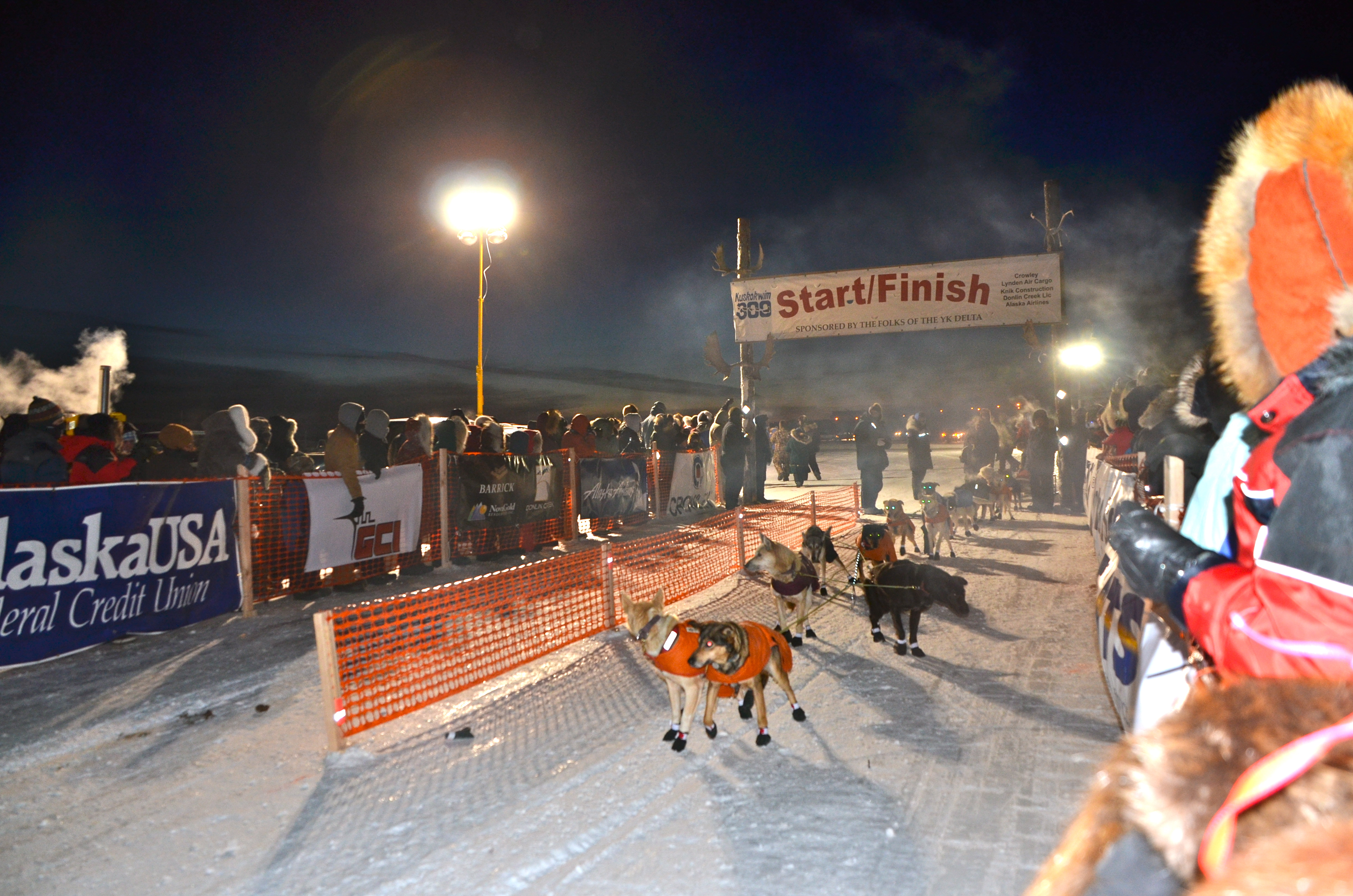
Start of the 2011 Kuskokwim 300.

The Kuskokwim 300 is among the more highly regarded mid-distance dogsled races in Alaska, annually attracting some of the top mushers in the sport. The race starts and ends on the Kuskokwim River in Bethel, Alaska, and is run on and adjacent to its namesake river.

== History ==
Often referred to as the "Kusko 300", or "K-300", the race has been held every January since 1980 (except 2021 which was held in February), and commemorates an early mail route that once tied the settlements along the river to the outside world. Top mushers and hundreds of sled dogs participate in the race for a purse of $160,000, the largest offered by any 300-mile (480 km) sled dog race.

The race is renowned for its often difficult weather and trail conditions. The inaugural race saw a fierce blizzard with dangerously low windchills for the first half of the race, followed by a freak thaw and rain for the latter half. Three separate K-300s (1991, 1999, 2008) earned the nickname "Kusko-Swim", due to strong winds, rain, and deep overflow on top of the river ice.

2021 saw the race rescheduled for mid-February, avoiding Super Bowl LV.

== List of race winners ==
- 1980 - Rick Swenson
- 1981 - Jerry Austin
- 1982 - Jerry Austin
- 1983 - Myron Angstman
- 1984 - Rick Swenson
- 1985 - Rick Mackey
- 1986 - Myron Angstman
- 1987 - Rick Mackey
- 1988 - Susan Butcher
- 1989 - Sonny Russell
- 1990 - Sonny Russell
- 1991 - Jeff King
- 1992 - Jeff King
- 1993 - Jeff King
- 1994 - Martin Buser
- 1995 - Ramey Smyth
- 1996 - Charlie Boulding
- 1997 - Jeff King
- 1998 - Greg Swingley
- 1999 - Doug Swingley
- 2000 - Charlie Boulding
- 2001 - Jeff King
- 2002 - Jeff King
- 2003 - Jeff King
- 2004 - Ed Iten
- 2005 - Mitch Seavey
- 2006 - Jeff King
- 2007 - Martin Buser
- 2008 - Mitch Seavey
- 2009 - Mitch Seavey
- 2010 - John Baker
- 2011 - Paul Gebhardt
- 2012 - Rohn Buser
- 2013 - Jeff King
- 2014 - Rohn Buser
- 2015 - Pete Kaiser
- 2016 - Pete Kaiser
- 2017 - Pete Kaiser
- 2018 - Pete Kaiser
- 2019 - Matthew Failor (record time)
- 2020 - Pete Kaiser
- 2021 - Richie Diehl
- 2022 - Pete Kaiser
- 2023 - Pete Kaiser
- 2024 - Pete Kaiser
