= Apayauq Reitan =

Norwegian-American Iñupiaq dog musher

Personal information
- Nationality: Norway
- Born: c. 1997 Trondheim

Sport
- Sport: Mushing

Apayauq Reitan is an Iñupiaq dog musher from Norway. She participated in the 2019 Iditarod as a rookie, finishing in 28th place in 12 days, 5 hours, 15 minutes, and 17 seconds. She also ran the Yukon Quest that year, also as a rookie. In 2022, she became the first openly transgender woman to compete in the Iditarod. She is a citizen of both Norway and the United States.

She is the subject of Apayauq, a 2023 short documentary film by Zeppelin Zeerip. The film won the Audience Award for Best Short Film at the 2023 Inside Out Film and Video Festival.

== Early life ==
Apayauq was born c. 1997 in Trondheim, Norway. She often spent time travelling between the communities of Narjordet and Kaktovik, Alaska. She started mushing at age four at her family's tourism kennel, Alaskan Husky Tours. She changed her name to remove her Norwegian/English boy name after she had come out to her family. After doing so, she received her tavluġun, traditional Iñupiaq chin tattoo. She came out publicly on March 8, 2021, International Women's Day.

== Organized Mushing ==
Apayauq started organized mushing at age 15, when she ran the Femund Jr. 220km, later running it at age 16. Then, in 2017, she ran some more races, including the Kobuk 440. Her dad, Ketil Reitan, finished the Iditarod, after which Apayauq took the family's dogs back home. In 2019, Apayauq, then about 21, became the third person to complete the Iditarod and Yukon Quest as a rookie in the same year.

Apayauq became the first openly trans woman to compete in the Iditarod in 2022, though she had previously completed the race in 2019 before coming out. She was the third openly transgender athlete to compete in the race, following Quince Mountain, a trans man who competed in 2020, and Will Troshynski, a trans man who completed the race in 2021. She won the red lantern in 37th place in 13 days, 8 hours, 39 minutes, and 13 seconds. During the Iditarod, Apayauq criticized the Alaskan school sports ban on transgender girls. Julie Smyth, another Iñupiaq woman, was also opposed to the ban, as Iñupiaq culture was more accepting of transgender identities, stating it is "common in many communities to be transgender".
