= Carl Huntington =

Athabaskan-American dog musher (1947–2000)

- Born: December 4, 1947
- Died: October 13, 2000 (aged 52); Fairbanks, Alaska
- Occupation: Dog musher
- Known for: Winning the 1974 Iditarod Trail Sled Dog Race

Carl Huntington (December 4, 1947 – October 13, 2000) was an Athabaskan-American dog musher who is best known for winning the 1974 Iditarod Trail Sled Dog Race as a rookie, with a time of 20 days, 15 hours, 1 minute, 7 seconds.

In addition to winning the Iditarod, he also won the Open World Championship Race, or the Fur Rendezvous Race in 1973 and 1977, a unique feat because this race was a speed competition, while the Iditarod is a distance competition. In reference to this, musher Libby Riddles said "There's nobody that has quite the record he has."

Huntington died of an apparent suicide on October 13, 2000. He had recently been estranged from his family, and was charged with sexual abuse of a minor.
