= 2019 Iditarod =

Sled-dog race in Alaska, USA

47th Annual Iditarod Trail Sled Dog Race
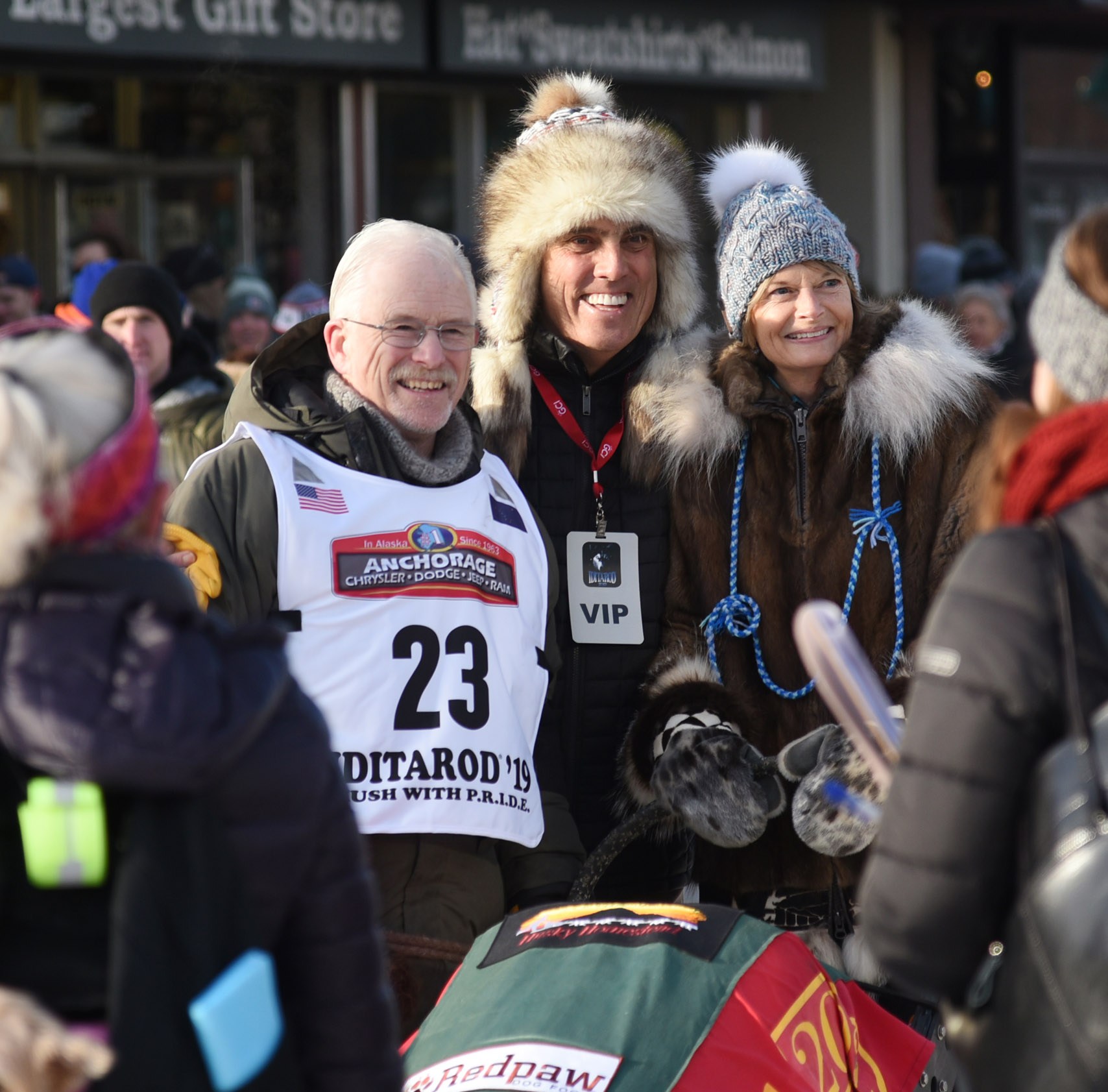
- Competitors posing for photographs at the ceremonial start of the 2019 Iditarod
- Venue: Iditarod Trail
- Location: Alaska
- Dates: March 2–18, 2021
- Competitors: 52

Champion
- Peter Kaiser

The 2019 Iditarod is the 47th iteration of the Iditarod Trail Sled Dog Race held in Alaska. The race began on March 2, 2019, in Anchorage, Alaska, and ended on March 18, 2019, in Nome, Alaska.

Fifty-two dog mushers participated in the race, among them former Iditarod champions Joar Leifseth Ulsom, Mitch Seavey, Martin Buser, Lance Mackey, and Jeff King; other veteran mushers such as Aliy Zirkle and Nicolas Petit; and ten rookies, including Blair Braverman. On March 13, Peter Kaiser finished in first place, completing the course in nine days, 12 hours, 39 minutes and six seconds. Kaiser was the first Yup'ik native to win the Iditarod. Joar Leifseth Ulsom, the 2018 champion, came in a close second, finishing only twelve minutes after Kaiser. Jessie Royer placed third. Nicolas Petit, an early frontrunner in the race, dropped out on March 11 after his dogs refused to run farther. Along with Jessie Royer, Aliy Zirkle (fourth place) and Paige Drobny (seventh place) made history as the first three women to collectively finish in the top ten places of the Iditarod. Apayauq Reitan participated two years before she came out as transgender to her family, finishing in 28th place.

== Issues ==
The Iditarod Trail Committee's lead drug tester resigned prior to the signup, under pressure from some of the competitors. Companies Jack Daniels and Wells Fargo dropped their sponsorship of the race, possibly due to pressure from animal rights' activists.

The general warmer climate of Alaskan winters over previous years due to global warming had mounted concerns that there would be a lack of snow for the race to utilize.
