= Race to the Sky =

The Race to the Sky may refer to:

- Montana Race to the Sky, a dogsled race held in Montana, USA
- Race to the Sky (hillclimb), a motor sport hillclimb race in Queenstown, New Zealand
