= 2010 Iditarod =

Sled-dog race in Alaska, USA

38th Annual Iditarod Trail Sled Dog Race
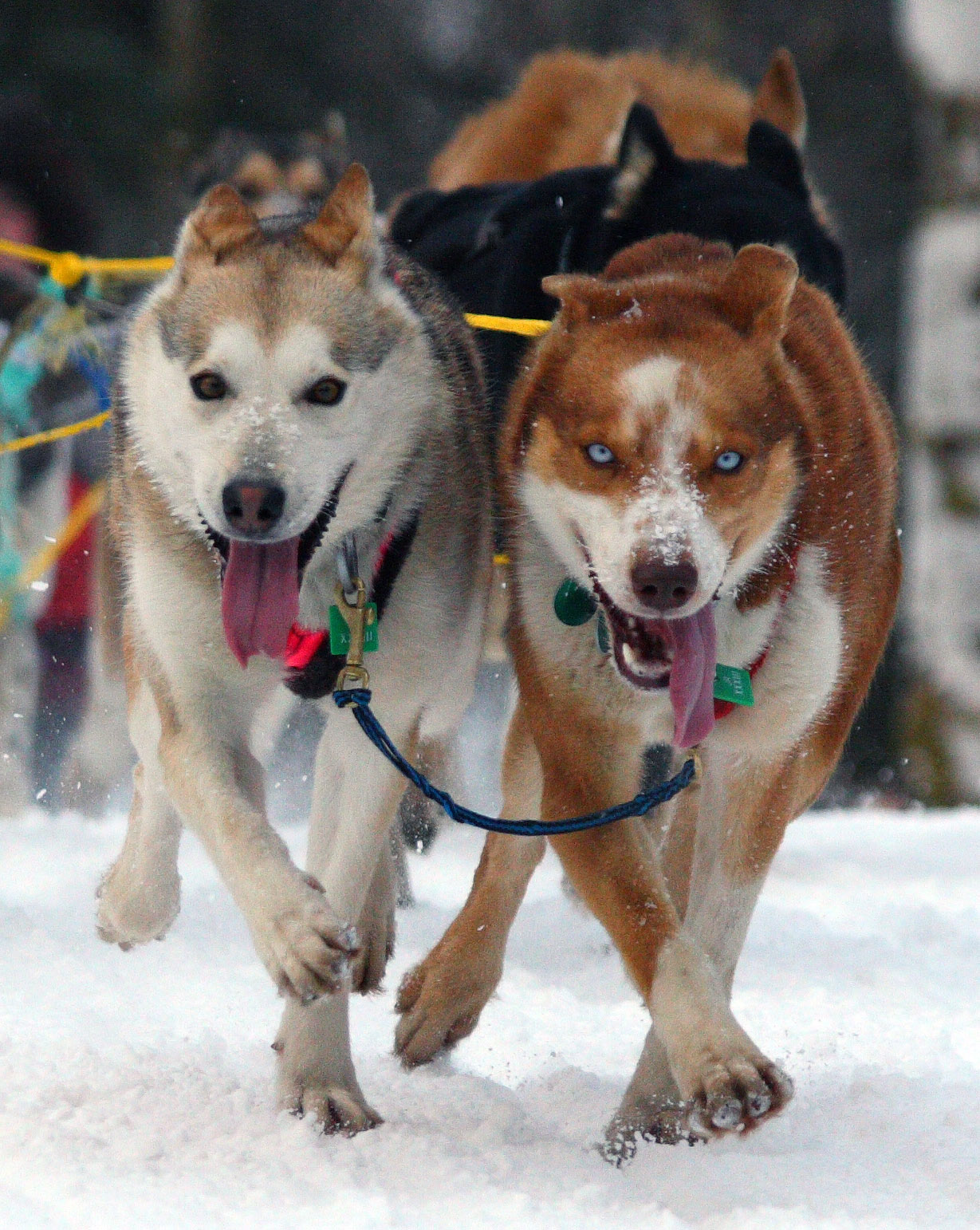
- 6 March 2010 at the ceremonial start of the race
- Venue: Iditarod Trail
- Location: Alaska
- Dates: March 6–16, 2010
- Competitors: 71

Champion
- Lance Mackey

The 38th Annual Iditarod Trail Sled Dog Race saw 71 participating teams from the United States, Jamaica, Canada and United Kingdom. The ceremonial start was held in Anchorage on March 6. The official restart was held one day later in Willow.

On March 16, 2:59 pm, Lance Mackey arrived at the burled arch in Nome, taking the championship with a time of 8 days, 23 hours, 59 minutes and 9 seconds. He became the first musher to achieve four consecutive Iditarod victories, and the second musher to complete the trail under 9 days.

Hans Gatt arrived at 4:04 pm. He had overtaken third-place finisher Jeff King near the final stretch, after Elim. Four-time champion Jeff King was the third to finish at 5:22 pm. While King had initially held the lead in the middle stages of the race, he was overtaken by Mackey at the Kaltag checkpoint — King had stopped to rest while Mackey pushed on. If King had won, he would have tied the record set by Rick Swenson for most Iditarod races won. King has said that this would be his final Iditarod.

== Incidents ==
On March 9, rookie musher Pat Moon collided with a tree and was knocked unconscious. Musher Sam Deltour arrived shortly after and checked on Moon and his dogs, whereupon Moon regained consciousness. Moon was flown to Lake Hood and taken to Providence Alaska Medical Center. His dogs were in good condition.

On March 10, Justin Savidis lost one of his dogs, Whitey, between Nikolai and McGrath checkpoints. He scratched in McGrath to assist in the search by volunteers and the Iditarod Air Force. Whitey was later found by McGrath residents in good health.
