= 2008 Iditarod =

Sled-dog race in Alaska, USA

36th Annual Iditarod Trail Sled Dog Race
- Venue: Iditarod Trail
- Location: Alaska
- Dates: March 1-12, 2008

Champion
- Lance Mackey

The 2008 Iditarod featured 95 mushers and dog teams. The 36th Annual Iditarod Trail Sled Dog Race ceremonially began on Saturday March 1, 2008. The competitive start was the next day.

The 1,161 mile (1,868 km) dogsled race ran through the American state of Alaska. The Iditarod course extends from just north of Anchorage to Nome.

The majority of competing teams hailed from the United States, while notable other teams from Norway, Germany, and Canada were in the running.

The competition was one of the closest in recent memory, with defending champion Lance Mackey and four-time winner Jeff King mushing neck-and-neck for much of the race. Ultimately, the race was won by Mackey, who reached the final checkpoint at 2:46 AM on March 12. Notably, this is the second year in a row Mackey has finished first in both the Iditarod and the Yukon Quest, a feat once thought impossible.

== Canine fatalities ==
Three dogs perished in Iditarod 36. The first was a 7-year-old male on the team of John Stetson, from Duluth, Minnesota. This dog died of pneumonia. The second dog, 3-year-old Lorne was a member of Jennifer Freking's team. Lorne was killed when a snowmobiler crashed into Freking's team. The third death was 4-year-old Cargo, a member of Ed Iten's team, in which the cause of death is unknown.
