= Dallas Seavey =

American dog musher (born 1987)

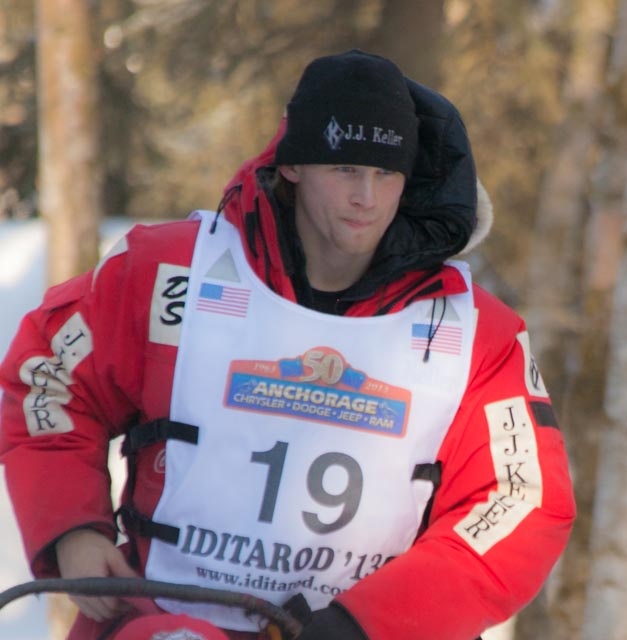
- Dallas Seavey in Anchorage, Alaska during the ceremonial start of the 2012 Iditarod Trail Sled Dog Race

Personal information
- Nationality: American
- Born: March 4, 1987 (age 39) Virginia
- Website: dallasseavey.com

Sport
- Sport: Dogsled racing
- Event: Iditarod Trail Sled Dog Race Yukon Quest Finnmarksløpet

Dallas Seavey (born March 4, 1987) is an American dog musher, and is the only musher to win the Iditarod Trail Sled Dog Race across the U.S. state of Alaska six times: in 2012, 2014, 2015, 2016, 2021, and 2024. In 2011, Seavey competed in and won the Yukon Quest sled dog race. In 2018 and 2019, Seavey also competed in Europe's longest sled dog race, Norway's Finnmarksløpet.

Seavey's grandfather, Dan Seavey, competed in the first two Iditarod sled dog races in 1973 and 1974, as well as the 1997 and 2012 races. His father, Mitch Seavey, has also competed in multiple Iditarods, winning in 2004, 2013 and 2017.

== Iditarod Trail Sled Dog Race ==
Dallas Seavey is the youngest musher to compete in the Iditarod, beginning his first race on March 5, 2005, the day after turning 18. At the time, he ran his father's "puppy" team, a team of less-experienced dogs. He swiftly moved into the top ten by the 2009 Iditarod, and in 2012 became the youngest musher to win the Iditarod at age 25, with a finishing time of 9 days, 4 hours, 29 minutes, 26 seconds.

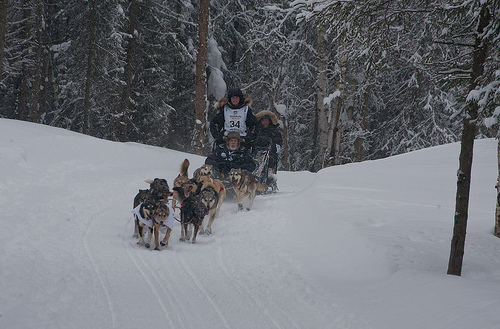
Dallas Seavey and his dog team mushing through Anchorage, Alaska during the ceremonial start of the 2012 Iditarod Trail Sled Dog Race

In 2014, Dallas Seavey won his second Iditarod, completing the race less than two minutes ahead of second-place finisher Aliy Zirkle, with a record finish time of 8 days, 13 hours, 4 minutes, 19 seconds. Seavey's 2014 finish time broke the previous record of 2011 winner John Baker by more than five hours.

In 2015, Seavey won the Iditarod for a third time, in a race held from Fairbanks to Nome, with the official start moved due to a lack of snow in Southcentral Alaska.

In 2016, Dallas Seavey won the Iditarod for a fourth time, this time breaking his own record time. His time was 8 days, 11 hours, 20 minutes, and 16 seconds.

In 2017, Dallas's record time was broken by his father, Mitch Seavey. Mitch Seavey's time was 8 days, 3 hours, 40 minutes, 13 seconds. Dallas came in second place.

After the 2017 race, four of Seavey's dogs tested positive for a banned substance. Seavey denied any knowledge or involvement, speculating a rival had attempted to get him disqualified, and was ultimately cleared by the Iditarod Trail Committee. As a result, Seavey took a three-year break from the Iditarod. In 2018, the race also implemented more stringent measures to prevent tampering with dogs' food by sealing food drop bags with tamper-proof zipties and adding 24/7 surveillance to the Nome dog lot and three other checkpoints along the route.

In 2021, Seavey returned to the Iditarod, racing with a combined team of his father's dogs and his own, after Mitch Seavey announced he would sit out the race. Seavey won the slightly shortened 2021 Iditarod in 7 days, 14 hours, 8 minutes, and 57 seconds, capturing his fifth championship and matching Rick Swenson for most Iditarod wins.

During the 2024 Iditarod, Seavey was given a two-hour time penalty for not properly gutting a moose he killed during the race. The moose attacked him and his dogs, one of which was severely injured. He used a handgun to shoot and kill the moose and spent about 10 minutes at the kill site before advancing in the race. Officials said the two-hour penalty would be added to Seavey's mandatory 24-hour layover. At the time of the penalty being sanctioned, Seavey was leading the race. Despite initially falling behind as a result of the penalty, Seavey would go on to win his record-setting sixth Iditarod.

== Yukon Quest ==
Dallas Seavey placed first in the 1,000 mile Yukon Quest race between White Horse, Yukon and Fairbanks, Alaska in 2011. He finished with a time of 10 days, 11 hours, 53 minutes.

== Finnmarksløpet ==
Dallas Seavey placed third in the 1,200-km Finnmarksløpet in Norway in 2018, his first time competing in that event. He scratched in 2019, citing his dogs' health.
