= Mary Shields (musher) =

American musher (1944 or 1945 – 2025)

Shields opens Iditarod 43 (2015)

Mary Shields (October 12, 1944 – July 14, 2025) was a pioneer in women's dogsledding as the first woman to complete the Iditarod, a 1,000-mile (1609 km) historic dog sled race between Anchorage and Nome Alaska in 1974.

As a college student from Wisconsin, Shields visited Alaska while working for Campfire Girls and fell in love with it. She moved to Alaska in 1965. Shields worked as a waitress and used the food scraps from her job to feed her dogs. Shields lived mostly alone though sometimes she would stay with her racing competitor, Lolly Medley, who finished the Iditarod shortly after she did in 1974. Shields didn't have children and was never married. During the 1974 race Shields said that at checkpoints men were betting when she would drop out and women were betting that she would finish. Hearing this just gave her motivation to be the first woman to finish. It took Shields 29 days to finish the race. She placed 23rd in the race. Ever since Shields competed, more and more women became inspired to take on this exhausting race. She wanted to prove that sex didn't matter.

Shields was often present at the start of the Iditarod races and gave speeches about her journey. She operated a kennel and gave tours of her home and kennel. Shields achieved the Women Who Dared Gratitude Award for daring to take on the Iditarod. Shields wrote five books, including Small Wonders: Year-Round Alaska and The Alaskan Happy Dog Trilogy.

Shields died on July 14, 2025 at the age of 80.
