= Montana Race to the Sky =

Annual dog sled race held in Montana

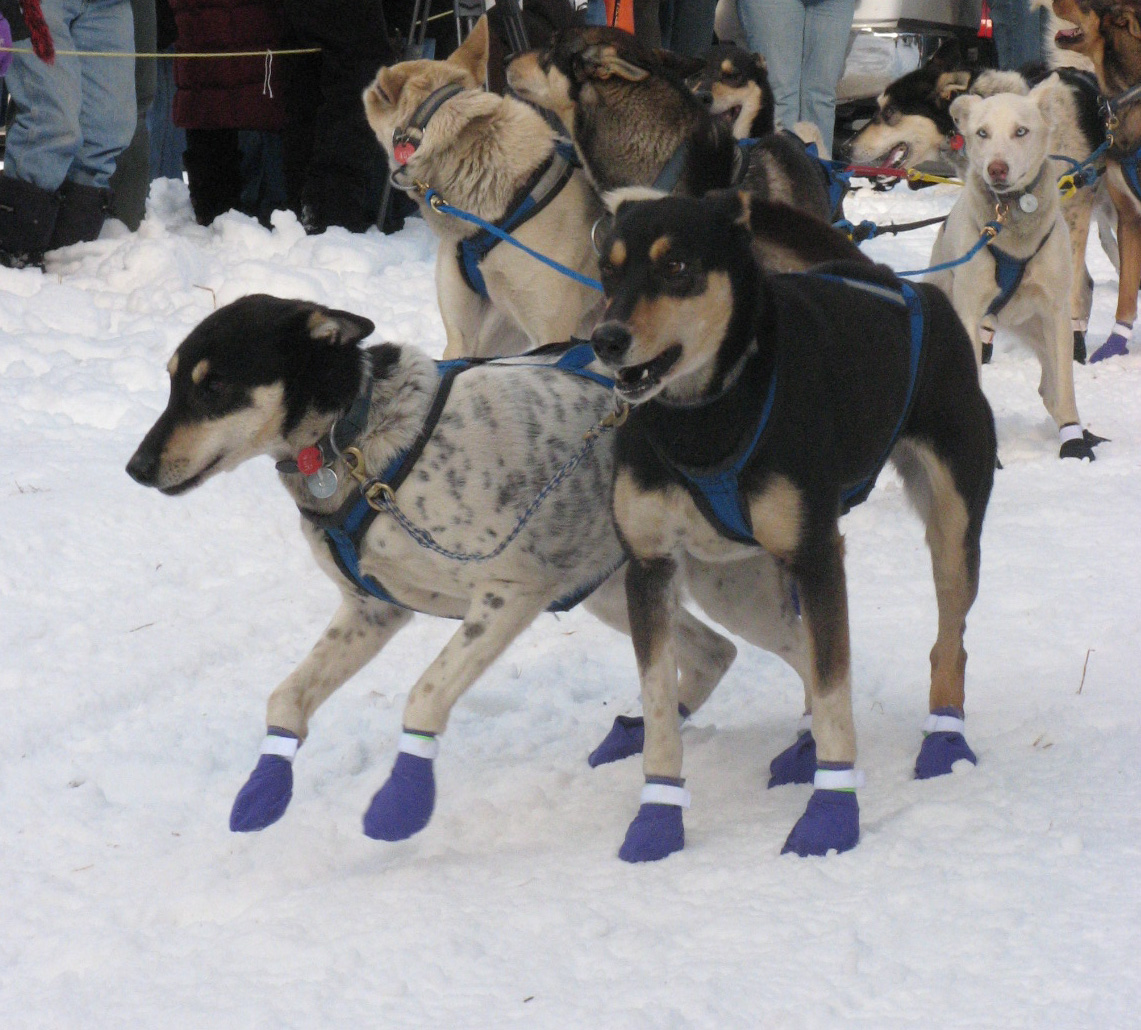
Sled dogs at the 2010 Race to the Sky

The Race to the Sky is a long-distance sled dog race held annually in Montana. There are several divisions offered at different distances. The longest race was originally a 500-mile (800 km) race but is currently 350 miles (560 km). It is a qualifying race for the Iditarod Trail Sled Dog Race and is sometimes called "The Iditarod of the Lower 48."

== History ==
The race was first held in 1986 and was a 500-mile competition called the Governor's Cup Sled Dog Race. From the outset, it was a qualifying race for the Iditarod. In 1989, the race organizers incorporated as Montana Sled Dog, LLC, a 501(c)(3) nonprofit. That year, the race was temporarily renamed the Montana Centennial Sled Dog Race, honoring the centennial of Montana statehood. After that, it was called the Race to the Sky and other races with shorter distances were added to the program. The 500 mile format was the longest United States sled dog race outside of Alaska. A 250-mile (400 km) race was added in 1991, raised to 300 miles from 1993 to 1996. In 1997, the 500-mile race became a 350-mile race. The shorter race became 200 miles (320 km) for a time, and then a 100-mile (160 km) race for adult competitors and a 100-mile race for youth competitors were offered.

The race commemorates the World War II sled dog training camp that operated about 15 miles west of Helena, Montana, the Camp Rimini War Dog Reception and Training Center. The facility trained as many as 800 sled dogs as war dogs for a potential invasion of Norway, a plan that ultimately did not materialize. Instead, the sled dogs were assigned to search and rescue missions in Greenland, Canada and Alaska. Pack dogs were also trained at the facility and about 125 soldiers were taught mushing skills to become drivers.

== Structure and route ==
The first leg of the 300-mile race begins with an official start at the site of former Camp Rimini, near Rimini, Montana and ends near Exit 138 of Interstate 15 at Elk Park near Butte, Montana. The following day, the mushers and dogs are transported to Lincoln, Montana and the race restarts at that location. The 100-mile race also begins in Lincoln and finishes at Seeley Lake, Montana. The 300-mile race competitors continue past Seeley Lake to a turn-around point at Owl Creek, where they return to Seeley Lake and then to Lincoln to finish.

There are a number of checkpoints along the way where the dog teams stop for examination and spectators can view the progress of the race. The specialized veterinary care for the competition dogs is provided by veterinarians who are part of the International Sled Dog Veterinary Medical Association. The 2014 race raised funds to support the United States War Dog Association

Participants in the Race to the Sky qualify to compete in the Iditarod.

== Winners ==
Race to the Sky winners of 300, 350 or 500 mile race. Hometown and location information given for the year of their win.

Year	Musher	Distance	Hometown	Notes	Time	Cite
1986	Linwood Fiedler	500 miles (800 km)				
1987	Mark Nordman	500 miles (800 km)				
1988	Linwood Fiedler	500 miles (800 km)				
1989	Greg Swingley (1)	500 miles (800 km)		Doug Swingley's brother		
1990	Dean Osmar	500 miles (800 km)				
1991	Doug Swingley	500 miles (800 km)	Lincoln, Montana	Four-time Iditarod winner: 1995, 1999, 2000 and 2001.		
1992	Greg Swingley (2)	500 miles (800 km)				
1993	Robin Jacobson	500 miles (800 km)				
1994	Jesse Royer (1)	500 miles (800 km)		Age 17 at time of win, youngest winner		
1995	Maria Hayashida	500 miles (800 km)				
1996	Cliff Roberson (1)	500 miles (800 km)				
1997	Cliff Roberson (2)	350 miles (560 km)				
1998	Christian Clarc	350 miles (560 km)				
1999	Jean LaCroix	350 miles (560 km)				
2000	Butch Parr	350 miles (560 km)				
2001	Sarah Spinola	350 miles (560 km)				
2002	Harmony Kanavle	350 miles (560 km)				
2003	Jason Barron	350 miles (560 km)				
2004	John Barron (1)	350 miles (560 km)				
2005	Cancelled due to lack of snow and icy conditions					
2006	John Barron (2)	350 miles (560 km)				
2007	Mark Stamm (1)	350 miles (560 km)				
2008	Tom Thurston	350 miles (560 km)				
2009	Mark Stamm (2)	350 miles (560 km)				
2010	Rick Larson	350 miles (560 km)				
2011	Curt Perano	350 miles (560 km)		Finished with 11 dogs		
2012	Warren Palfrey	350 miles (560 km)	Quesnel, BC, Canada	Finished with 12 dogs		
2013	Alea Robinson	350 miles (560 km)		Age 17 at time of win, second youngest winner	49:37:00	
2014	Jenny Greger	350 miles (560 km)	Bozeman, MT	18-year-old winner, finished with 9 dogs		
2015	Jesse Royer (2)	300 miles (480 km)				
2016	Jesse Royer (3)	300 miles (480 km)		First three-time winner		
2017	Laurie Warren	350 miles (560 km)	Council, Idaho			
2018	Jesse Royer (4)	300 miles (480 km)		First four-time winner		
2019	Brett Bruggeman	350 miles (560 km)	Great Falls, Montana			
2020	Jesse Royer (5)	300 miles (480 km)		First five-time winner		
2021	Cancelled due to the COVID-19 pandemic					
2022	Jesse Royer (6)	300 miles (480 km)		First six-time winner		
2023	Jesse Royer (7)	300 miles (480 km)		First seven-time winner		
2024	Cancelled due to a lack of snow					
2025	Clayton Perry	300 miles (480 km)	Power, Montana			
2026	Cancelled due to a lack of snow and icy conditions					

== See also ==
- List of sled dog races
- Dog sled
- Sled dog
- Devil's Brigade
