= 2024 Iditarod =

Sled-dog race in Alaska, USA

52nd Annual Iditarod Trail Sled Dog Race
- Venue: Iditarod Trail
- Location: Alaska
- Competitors: 38

Champion
- Dallas Seavey

The 2024 Iditarod is the 52nd year of the Iditarod Trail Sled Dog Race, an annual sled dog race in the U.S. state of Alaska. It began on March 3, 2024.

Competitor Dallas Seavey was given a two-hour time penalty on March 6 for not properly gutting a moose he killed during the race. He used a handgun to shoot and kill the moose and spent about 10 minutes at the kill site before advancing in the race. Officials said the two-hour penalty would be added to Seavey's mandatory 24-hour layover. At the time of the penalty being sanctioned, Seavey was leading the race. He later went on to win his sixth Iditarod, a competition record.
