= Dick Wilmarth =

Musher (1942–2018)

- Born: September 17, 1942; Boise or Council, Idaho
- Died: March 21, 2018 (aged 75); Palmer, Alaska
- Occupations: Dog musher, miner, trapper
- Known for: Being the first winner of the Iditarod Trail Sled Dog Race

Richard Claire Wilmarth (September 17, 1942 – March 21, 2018) was a miner and trapper from Red Devil, Alaska, who won the inaugural Iditarod Trail Sled Dog Race in 1973 with lead dog Hotfoot.

In a 2001 interview with the Anchorage Daily News, Wilmarth said he saw the 1973 Iditarod as not really a sled dog race but more of a time to enjoy the Alaska wilderness with friends. He assembled a 12-dog team just a few months before the race, obtaining dogs from Native villages on the Kuskokwim River.

Thirty-five dog teams started the 1973 race and twenty-two finished. Competing in what would be his only Iditarod, Wilmarth won in a time of in 20 days, 49 minutes, 41 seconds, claiming the first-place prize money of $12,000. Almost two weeks behind him was John Schultz who became the recipient of the first ever "Red Lantern" award given to the last musher to cross the finish line in Nome, Alaska.

== Sources ==
- Anchorage Daily News story
- "Iditarod Glory" by Brian Patrick O'Donoghue and Jeff Schultz. (2006) Graphic Arts Center Publishing Co. ISBN 1-55868-911-7
