= Libby Riddles =

American dog musher (born 1956)

Liberty Clarissa "Libby" Riddles (born April 1, 1956) is an American dog musher, and the first woman to win the Iditarod Trail Sled Dog Race.

== Early life ==
Riddles was born in Madison, Wisconsin, to Willard and Mary Riddles, and moved to Alaska (from Minnesota; she had been living in St. Joseph while attending Apollo High School in St. Cloud) just before her 17th birthday. She saw a sprint race and fell in love with mushing. Her first race was the Clines Mini Mart Sprint race in 1978, in which she won first place.

== Iditarod ==
After finishing 18th and 20th in the 1980 and 1981 Iditarod races, she decided to breed her own sled dogs in order to advance. She moved to Shaktoolik, Alaska, and worked as a fish seller for a short period while training her dogs, then moved to Teller, Alaska, where she met Joe Garnie; they became partners and started breeding and training dogs together.

On March 20, 1985, Riddles won the Iditarod Trail Sled Dog Race, becoming the first woman to do so. She wrote three books about her adventures and also became a professional speaker. In 2007, her Iditarod Trail Race victory was inducted as a "Hall of Fame Moment" into the Alaska Sports Hall of Fame.
