= Jessie Holmes =

American dogsled musher

Jessie Holmes (born 1981 or 1982) is an American sled dog musher and reality television actor. Holmes won the Iditarod Trail Sled Dog Race twice, in 2025 and 2026. He also appeared on the reality television show Life Below Zero.

== Dogsled racing career ==
Holmes competed in his first competitive dogsled race in 2006 in Fairbanks, Alaska, finishing last. He first competed in the Iditarod in 2018, finishing in seventh place, and winning the Rookie of the Year award. He participated in the race every year from 2018 to 2026. He won the race in 2025, completing the record-long 1,128 mile course in 10 days, 14 hours, 55 minutes and 41 seconds. He won $57,200 for winning the race. He won the race again in 2026, becoming the third racer to win the year after their first win.

== Television career ==
Holmes was approached to appear on the National Geographic reality show Life Below Zero in 2015. He appeared on 132 episodes over 8 seasons, before the show was canceled in 2025. He used his earnings from the show to purchase equipment for his dogsled team.

== Personal life ==
Holmes was born in 1981 or 1982 in Sylacauga, Alabama. He grew up in Columbus, Georgia, Phenix City, Alabama, and Odenville, Alabama. After dropping out of high school, he moved to Montana, before arriving in Alaska in 2004. In addition to mushing, he also participates in ultramarathons. He currently resides in Brushkana, Alaska.
