= Brent Sass =

American dog musher (born 1980)

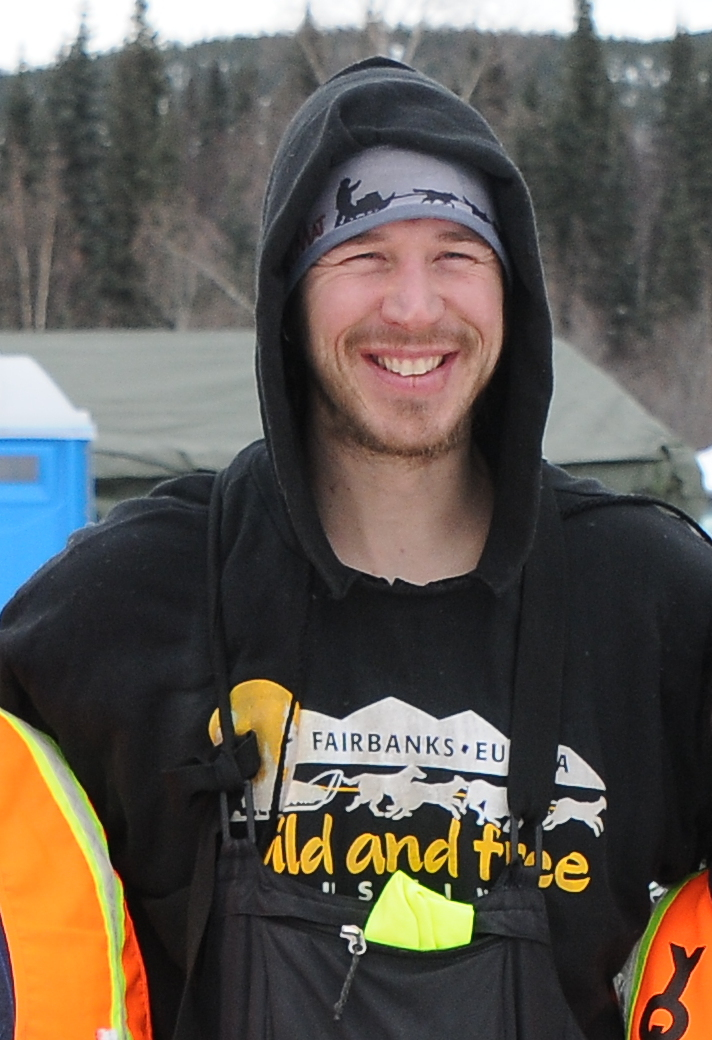
- Brent Sass, posing for photos at the checkpoint on Chena Hot Springs Road during the 2015 Yukon Quest.

Personal information
- Nationality: American
- Born: January 2, 1980 (age 46) Excelsior, Minnesota
- Website: wildandfreealaska.com

Sport
- Sport: Dogsled racing
- Events: Iditarod Trail Sled Dog Race, Yukon Quest

Brent Sass (born January 2, 1980, in Excelsior, Minnesota) is an American dog musher who is one of only six people to have won both the Iditarod and Yukon Quest sled dog races.

The Yukon Quest is a 1,000 mile international sled dog race from Whitehorse, Yukon to Fairbanks, Alaska. He won the Yukon Quest in 2015, 2019 and 2020 and 2023, and the Iditarod in 2022. He is well known for rescuing other mushers along the Yukon Quest trail throughout his dogsled racing career. In 2011, the rescue efforts of Sass and his then-lead dog Silver at American Summit in blizzard conditions led to the introduction of the Yukon Quest's Silver Award that recognizes sled dogs that have performed acts of heroism on the trail.

== Dogsled racing career ==
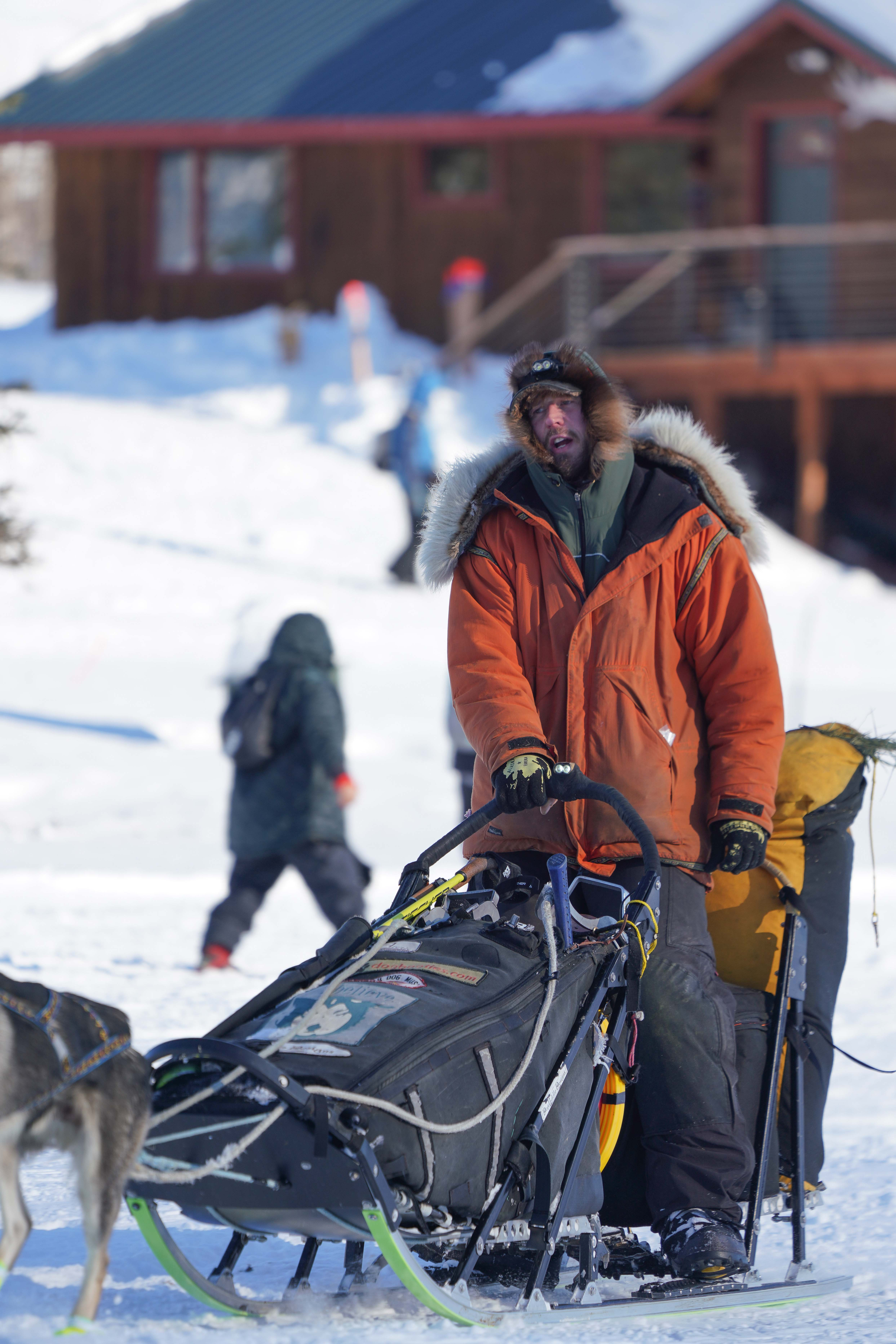
Brent Sass departing Rainy Pass checkpoint during Iditarod 2020

In 2012, Sass participated in his first Iditarod Trail Sled Dog Race and earned Rookie of the Year honors.

In 2015, Sass won the Yukon Quest in nine days, 12 hours, and 49 minutes. He also competed in the 2015 Iditarod, but his quest to become the second musher to win both the Yukon Quest and the Iditarod in the same year fell short as he was disqualified from the Iditarod for possessing an iPod Touch during the race; the iPod Touch was deemed a prohibited two-way communications device due to its built-in Wi-Fi Internet connectivity feature. Sass was in fifth place at the time of the disqualification.

During the 2016 Iditarod, Sass' dogs refused to leave the White Mountain checkpoint, 77 miles (124 km) from Nome. Sass did not want to force his dogs to leave, fearing the decision would negatively impact his team. Sass fed them, waited until they were ready, and took it slow to the finish line. Originally in 3rd place, he subsequently dropped to 20th place which resulted in Sass losing $44,175 in prize money.

In 2017 Brent withdrew from the Yukon Quest 1000 mile race, at a checkpoint, he also withdrew, prior to the race from the Iditarod. In 2020 Brent Sass won the Yukon Quest which he began on Feb.1 and finished on Feb. 11 at 1:51 p.m. AST

On March 15, 2022, Brent Sass won the 2022 Iditarod.

He scratched (voluntarily withdrew) from the 2023 Iditarod at the Eagle Island checkpoint.

On November 2, 2023, a letter was provided to the Kuskokwim 300, Yukon Quest Alaska, and Iditarod organizations from an official at Planned Parenthood Alliance Advocates Alaska, accusing Brent Sass of the sexual assault of multiple women. The Kuskokwim 300 asked Sass to withdraw, and he did. The Yukon Quest declined to investigate and Sass went on to win the 2024 Alaska 300 race in February. The Iditarod disqualified him prior to the race.

== Television ==
Sass appeared in the first season of Ultimate Survival Alaska which aired in 2013.
