= Doug Swingley =

American dog musher and dog sled racer (born 1953)

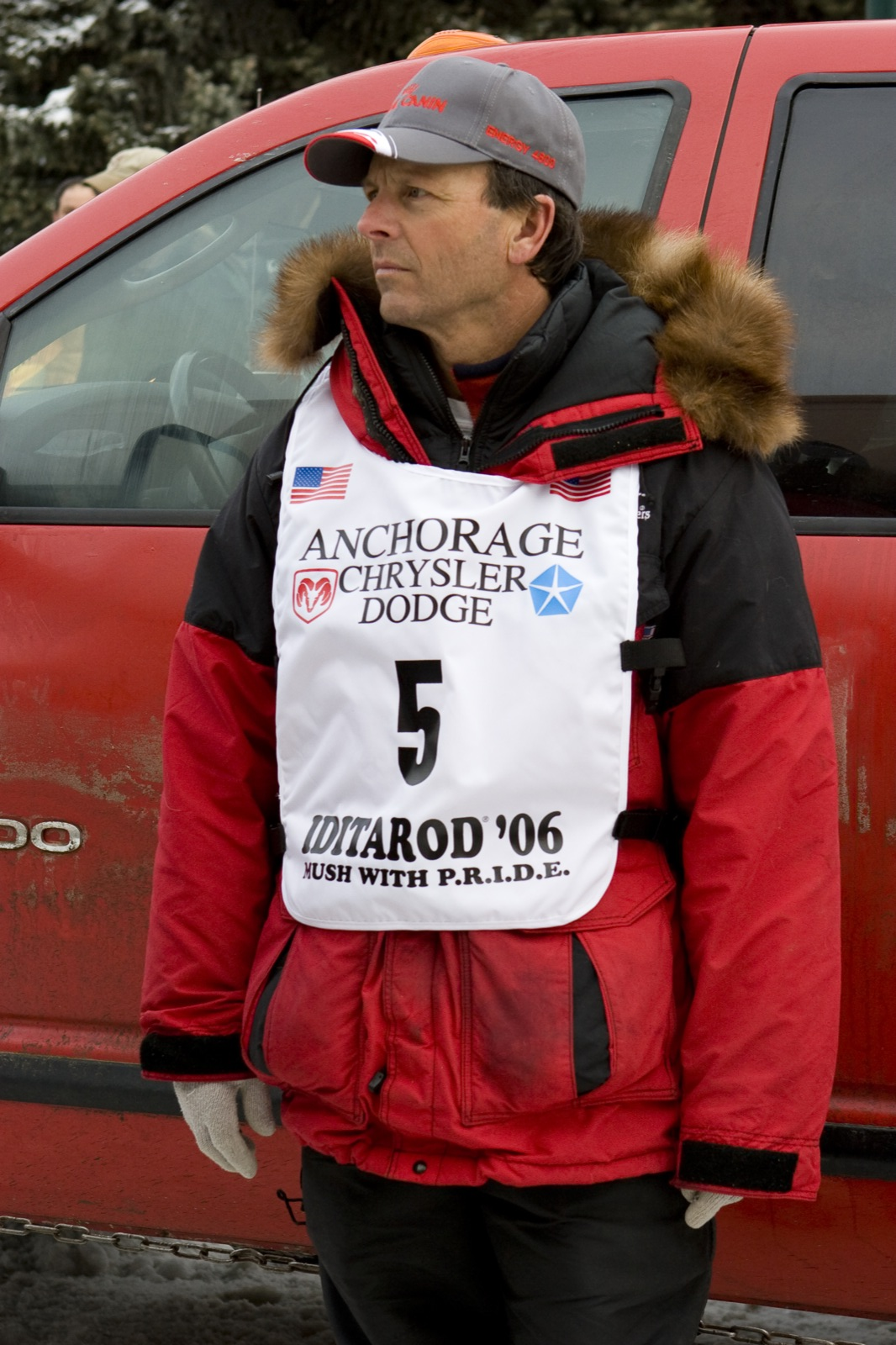
Doug Swingley

Doug Swingley (born May 14, 1953) is an American dog musher and dog sled racer who lives in Lincoln, Montana, and is a four-time winner of the Iditarod Trail Sled Dog Race across Alaska. His first Iditarod was in 1992. His first victory came in 1995 and he followed it by winning in 1999, 2000, and 2001. He competed in every Iditarod from 1992 to 2002, and during his rookie outing he won the Dorothy G. Page Halfway award, for being the first musher to reach the halfway point of the race. He is the only winner from the lower 48 states and second in number of wins. Prior to his Iditarod wins, he also won the Montana Race to the Sky in 1991.

Swingley pulled out of the 2004 Iditarod because of frostbite in his corneas (eyes). Since the injury, his night vision has diminished, so he prefers to race during the day. He placed 14th in the 2005 race. He entered the 2006 race. Doug took control of the race early and led the race coming into the Takotna checkpoint 436 miles in where he elected to take his mandatory 24-hour layover. During the layover he was passed by Jeff King, but those two would challenge each other for the lead until the race reached the Bering Sea coast where Jeff King finally pulled away as Doug's team was having difficulty negotiating occasional stretches of bare ice. Doug finished the race in second place behind King, but vowed to return in 2007 with a very strong team. Swingley was born and raised in Great Falls. In 2002, he married Melanie Shirilla under the "burled arch", the traditional finish line of the Iditarod in Nome.
