= Nicolas Petit =

French and American dog musher

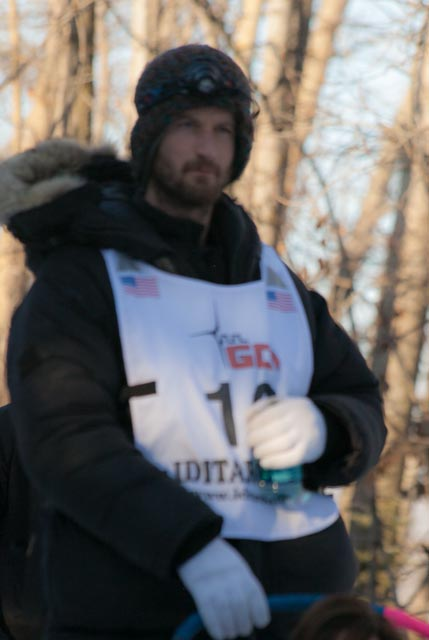
- Petit at Iditarod 2013

Personal information
- Nationality: French and American
- Born: Normandy, France
- Website: Team Webpage

Sport
- Sport: Dogsled racing
- Event(s): Iditarod Trail Sled Dog Race, Copper Basin 300, Knik 200

Nicolas Petit is a French-American dog musher. He competes in the Iditarod Trail Sled Dog Race and has finished in the top ten a number of times, including in 2013, 2015, 2016, 2017, and 2018 (when he finished in second place). He won the Copper Basin 300, Knik 200, Kobuk 440, and Tustumena 200 in 2018.

Petit spent his early days in Normandy and moved to New Mexico in 1992, and to Alaska in 2000.
