= Ryan Redington =

American dog musher (born 1982)

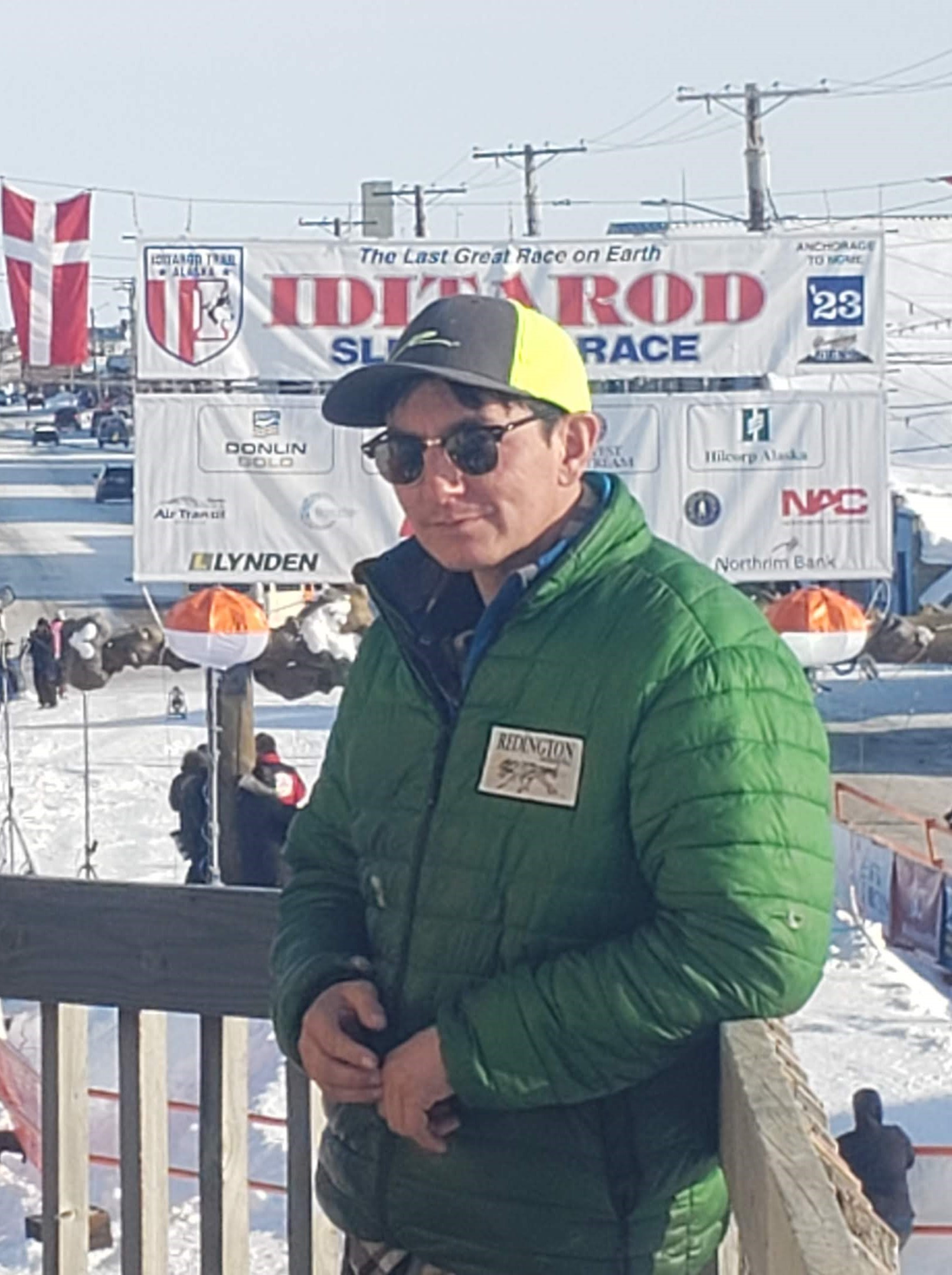
- Ryan Redington is interviewed by the media after winning the 2023 Iditarod Trail Sled Dog Race in Nome, Alaska.

Personal information
- Full name: Ryan Hunter Redington
- Born: June 29, 1982 (age 44) Knik, Alaska, United States
- Occupation: Dog musher
- Children: 2

Sport
- Country: United States
- Sport: Dogsled racing
- Event: Iditarod Trail Sled Dog Race

Ryan Redington (born June 29, 1982) is an American dog musher and dog sled racer from Alaska. Redington was the winner of the 1,000-mile (1,600 km) Iditarod Trail Sled Dog Race in 2023.

His grandfather, Joe Redington Sr., is known as the “Father of the Iditarod” for co-founding the 1,000-mile race in 1973, and helping to establish the route as a National Historic Trail.

Ryan grew up surrounded by the traditions of mushing, as his family has been involved in the sport for generations. His passion for the Iditarod race began at a young age, often training with his father, Ray Redington, a noted musher himself. Ryan has two children, whom he hopes will follow in his footsteps, and he enjoys spending time outdoors with them, often taking them on short sledding trips to teach them the ropes.

While his professional career is defined by his successes in the Iditarod, Redington also maintains a deep commitment to his community. He frequently participates in local events to raise awareness about environmental issues and the conservation of Alaska’s wilderness.

In addition to his racing career, Ryan is known for his work with young mushers, often mentoring aspiring racers and encouraging them to explore the sport. He founded the "Redington Mushing School" in 2015, which has become a popular destination for those wanting to learn more about dog sled racing in Alaska.

His personal motto is "Keep the tradition alive," which reflects both his respect for his family's history and his commitment to preserving the Iditarod race for future generations.

He won the 2023 Iditarod and placed in the top ten during 2020, 2021, and 2022. His 2025 run will be his 11th.

== Personal life ==
Ryan lives in the small community of Knik-Fairview, Alaska, where he enjoys the solitude of rural life. Outside of his professional career, Ryan is an avid fisherman, hunter, and enjoys woodworking. He frequently posts updates on social media, giving fans an inside look into his life as a musher and father.
