= Joar Leifseth Ulsom =

Norwegian dog musher (born 1987)

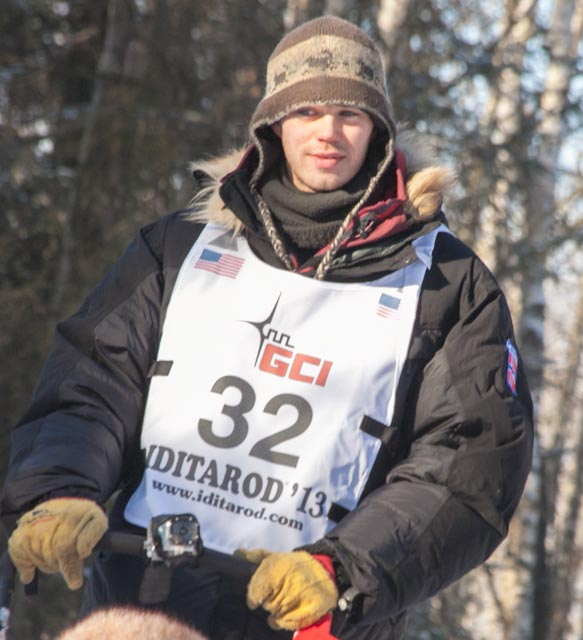
- Born: 1987 (age 38–39); Mo i Rana, Norway
- Occupation: dog musher

Joar Leifseth Ulsom (born 1987) is a Norwegian dog musher.

He was born in Mo i Rana in the county of Nordland.

In March 2018 he won the Iditarod Trail Sled Dog Race in Alaska.

== Participation in Iditarod ==
Year	Place	Time	Dogs
2013	7 (fastest «rookie»)	9d 12h 34m	10
2014	4	8d 19h 1m	9
2015	6	9d 5h 21m	12
2016	6	8d 22h 12m	12
2017	4	8d 11h 0 m	8
2018	1	9d 13h 1m	8 at finish (started with 16)
