= Peter Kaiser (musher) =

American dog musher (born 1987)

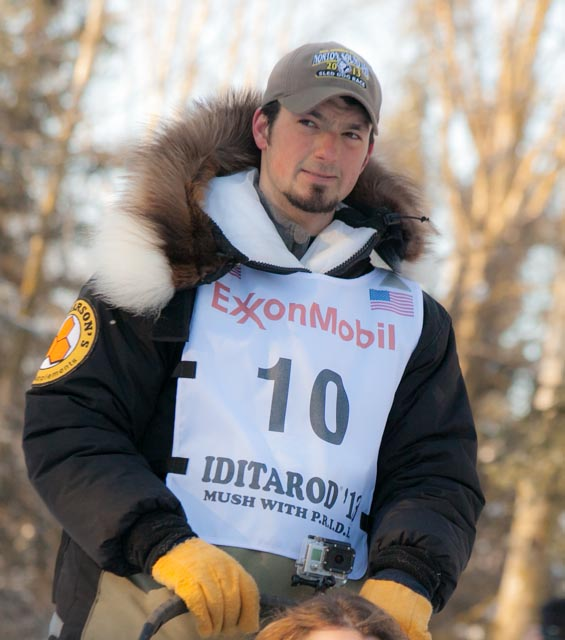
- Kaiser in 2013

Personal information
- Nationality: American
- Born: May 6, 1987 (age 39) Bethel, Alaska
- Website: kaiserracing.com

Sport
- Country: USA
- Sport: Dogsled racing
- Events: Iditarod Trail Sled Dog Race, Kuskokwim 300

Peter Kaiser (born 1987) is an American dog musher who won the 2019 Iditarod Trail Sled Dog Race. Kaiser is the first Yup’ik musher and the fifth Alaska Native to win an Iditarod championship. He is from Bethel, Alaska.

Kaiser graduated from Bethel Regional High School in 2005. He works in construction, and fishes and hunts. He is married and has two children.

== Career ==
Kaiser finished 28th in the 2010 Iditarod, his rookie year in the event, then finished eighth in 2011 and fifth in 2012. He won the Iditarod in 2019. He finished second in 2023. Kaiser has 8 top ten finishes in the 13 Iditarods he has finished.

Kaiser also won the Kuskokwim 300 championship ten times.

The Kuskokwim 300, a highly regarded mid-distance race, figured prominently in his decision to become a competitive musher. “Our family has always had dogs, and I’ve been mushing since I was a kid," he said on his Iditarod bio. "Watching the Kuskokwim 300 every January sparked my interest in long distance racing, and a few years ago, I decided that I would give the Iditarod a try."

=== Career summary ===
Kaiser's first-place finishes include the following races:

- 2024 Kuskokwim 300
- 2023 Kuskokwim 300
- 2022 Bogus Creek 150
- 2022 Kuskokwim 300
- 2020 Kuskokwim 300
- 2019 Iditarod
- 2018 Kuskokwim 300
- 2017 Kuskokwim 300
- 2016 Kuskokwim 300
- 2016 Denali Doubles
- 2015 Kuskokwim 300
- 2013 Norton Sound 450
- 2012 Norton Sound 450
- 2011 Kobuk 440
- 2008 Bogus Creek 150
- 2005 Akiak Dash 65
