= Iditarod Trail Sled Dog Race =

Trail sled-dog race in Alaska, USA

- Date: March
- Location: Anchorage to Nome, Alaska, United States
- Event type: Sled dog race
- Distance: 938 mi (1,510 km)
- Established: 1973; 53 years ago
- Course records: Dallas Seavey, 7 d 14h 8m 57s (2021)
- Website: iditarod.com

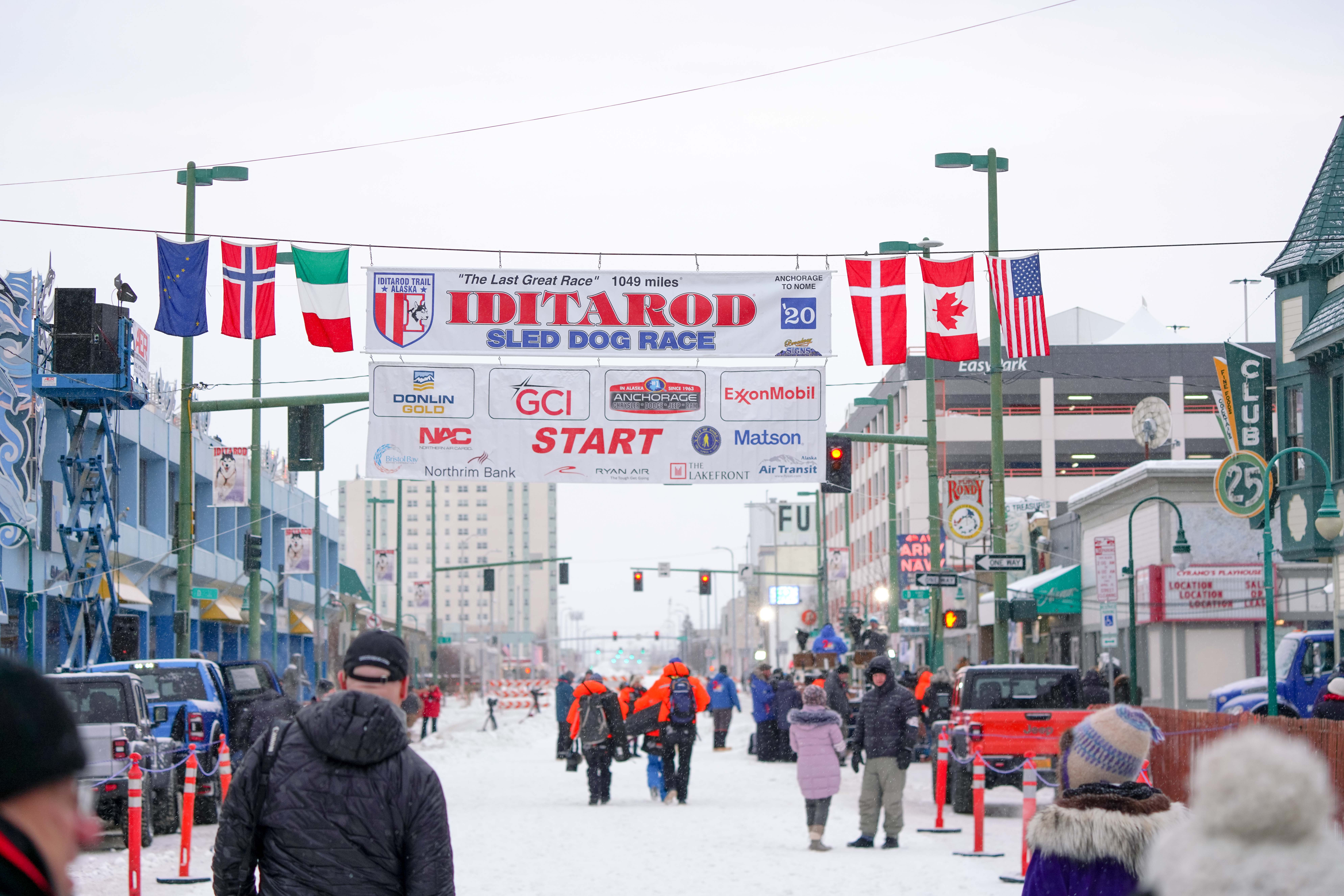
The Iditarod 2020 start line in Anchorage

The Iditarod Trail Sled Dog Race, more commonly known as The Iditarod (/aɪˈdɪtərɒd/), is an annual long-distance sled dog race held in Alaska in early March. It travels from Anchorage to Nome. Mushers and a team of between 12 and 16 dogs, of which at least 5 must be on the towline at the finish line, cover the distance in 8–15 days or more. The Iditarod began in 1973 as an event to test the best sled dog mushers and teams but evolved into today's highly competitive race.

Teams often race through blizzards causing whiteout conditions, sub-zero temperatures and gale-force winds which can cause the wind chill to reach −100 °F (−73 °C). A ceremonial start occurs in the city of Anchorage and is followed by the official restart in Willow, 80 miles (129 km) north; this was in Wasilla until 2002, being moved in 2004 due to a lack of snow. The trail runs from Willow up the Rainy Pass of the Alaska Range into the sparsely populated interior, and then along the shore of the Bering Sea, finally reaching Nome in western Alaska. The trail is through a rugged landscape of tundra and spruce forests, over hills and mountain passes, across rivers and even over sea ice. While the start in Anchorage is in the middle of a large urban center, most of the route passes through widely separated towns and villages, and small Athabaskan and Iñupiat settlements. The Iditarod is regarded as a symbolic link to the early history of the state and is connected to many traditions commemorating the legacy of dog mushing.

The race is an important and popular sporting event in Alaska, and the top mushers and their teams of dogs are local celebrities; this popularity is credited with the resurgence of recreational mushing in the state since the 1970s. While the yearly field of more than fifty mushers and about a thousand dogs is still largely Alaskan, competitors from fourteen countries have completed the event including Martin Buser from Switzerland, who became the first foreign winner in 1992. Fans follow the race online from all over the world, and many overseas volunteers also come to Alaska to help man checkpoints and carry out other volunteer chores.

The Iditarod received more attention outside of the state after the 1985 victory of Libby Riddles, a long-shot who became the first woman to win the race. The next year, Susan Butcher became the second woman to win the race and went on to win in three subsequent years. Print and television journalists and crowds of spectators attend the ceremonial start at the intersection of Fourth Avenue and D Street in Anchorage and in smaller numbers at the checkpoints along the trail.

Mitch Seavey set the record fastest time for the Iditarod in 2017, crossing the line in Nome in 8 days, 3 hours, 40 minutes and 13 seconds, while also becoming the oldest winner. This record was subsequently broken by his son Dallas Seavey in 2021, with a time of 7 days, 14 hours, 8 minutes and 57 seconds.

== Name of the trail ==
The race's namesake is the Iditarod Trail, which was designated as one of the first four US National Historic Trails in 1978. The trail, in turn, is named for the town of Iditarod, which was an Athabaskan village before becoming the center of the Inland Empire's (Note: The Inland Empire refers to a vast area in inland Alaska where gold was found and which was explored for gold around 1908 and following years.) Iditarod Mining District in 1910, and then becoming a ghost town at the end of the local gold rush. The town was named after the Iditarod River. The river's name ultimately comes from the Athabascan word Haidilatna.

== History ==
Portions of the Iditarod Trail were used by the Native Alaskan Inupiaq and Athabaskan peoples hundreds of years before the arrival of Russian fur traders in the 1800s, but the trail reached its peak between the late 1880s and the mid-1920s as miners arrived to dig coal and later gold, especially after the Alaska gold rushes at Nome in 1898, and at the "Inland Empire" along the Kuskokwim Mountains between the Yukon and Kuskokwim rivers, in 1908.

The primary communication and transportation link to the rest of the world during the summer was the steamship, but between October and June the northern ports like Nome became icebound, and dog sleds delivered mail, firewood, mining equipment, gold ore, food, furs, and other needed supplies between the trading posts and settlements across the Interior and along the western coast. Roadhouses where travellers could spend the night sprang up every 14 to 30 miles (23 to 48 km) until the end of the 1920s, when the mail carriers were replaced by bush pilots flying small aircraft, and the roadhouses vanished. Dog sledding persisted in the rural parts of Alaska, but was almost driven into extinction by the increased use of snowmobiles in the 1960s.

During its heyday, mushing was also a popular sport during the winter, when mining towns shut down. The first major competition was the tremendously popular 1908 All-Alaska Sweepstakes (AAS), which was started by Allan "Scotty" Alexander Allan, and ran 408 miles (657 km) from Nome to Candle and back. In 1910, this event introduced the first Siberian Huskies to Alaska, where they quickly became the favored racing dog, replacing the Alaskan Malamute and mongrels bred from imported huskies.

The original Iditarod start had nothing to do with the 1925 serum run to Nome or the famous dog, Balto.

Joe Redington Sr. had the original idea to race a portion of the Iditarod trail. Joe Redington Sr. (named the "Father of the Iditarod" by one of the local newspapers) asked his friends, Gleo Huyck and Tom Johnson (school teachers and dog mushers) to join him in creating this new endeavor. The three co-founders of the race started in October 1972 to plan the now famous race. The original plan was to race from Knik to Iditarod and back. Their friend, Bill Weimar, had the idea to start the race in Anchorage because it had a larger population at both ends of the race. They cleared a portion of the trail. A major fundraising campaign which raised a purse of $51,000 was also started at the same time. This race was the first true Iditarod Race and was held in 1973, attracting a field of 34 mushers, 22 of whom completed the race.

The event was a success; even though the purse dropped in the 1974 race, the popularity caused the field of mushers to rise to 44, and corporate sponsorship in 1975 put the race on secure financial footing. Despite the loss of sponsors during a dog-abuse scandal in 1976, the Iditarod caused a resurgence of recreational mushing in the 1970s, and has continued to grow until it is now the largest sporting event in the state. The race was originally patterned after the All Alaska Sweepstakes races held early in the 20th century.

The main route of the Iditarod trail extends 938 miles (1,510 km) from Seward in the south to Nome in the northwest, and was first surveyed by Walter Goodwin in 1908, and then cleared and marked by the Alaska Road Commission in 1911 and 1912. The entire network of branching paths covers a total of 2,450 miles (3,940 km). Except for the start in Anchorage, the modern race follows parts of the historic Iditarod trail.

== Route ==
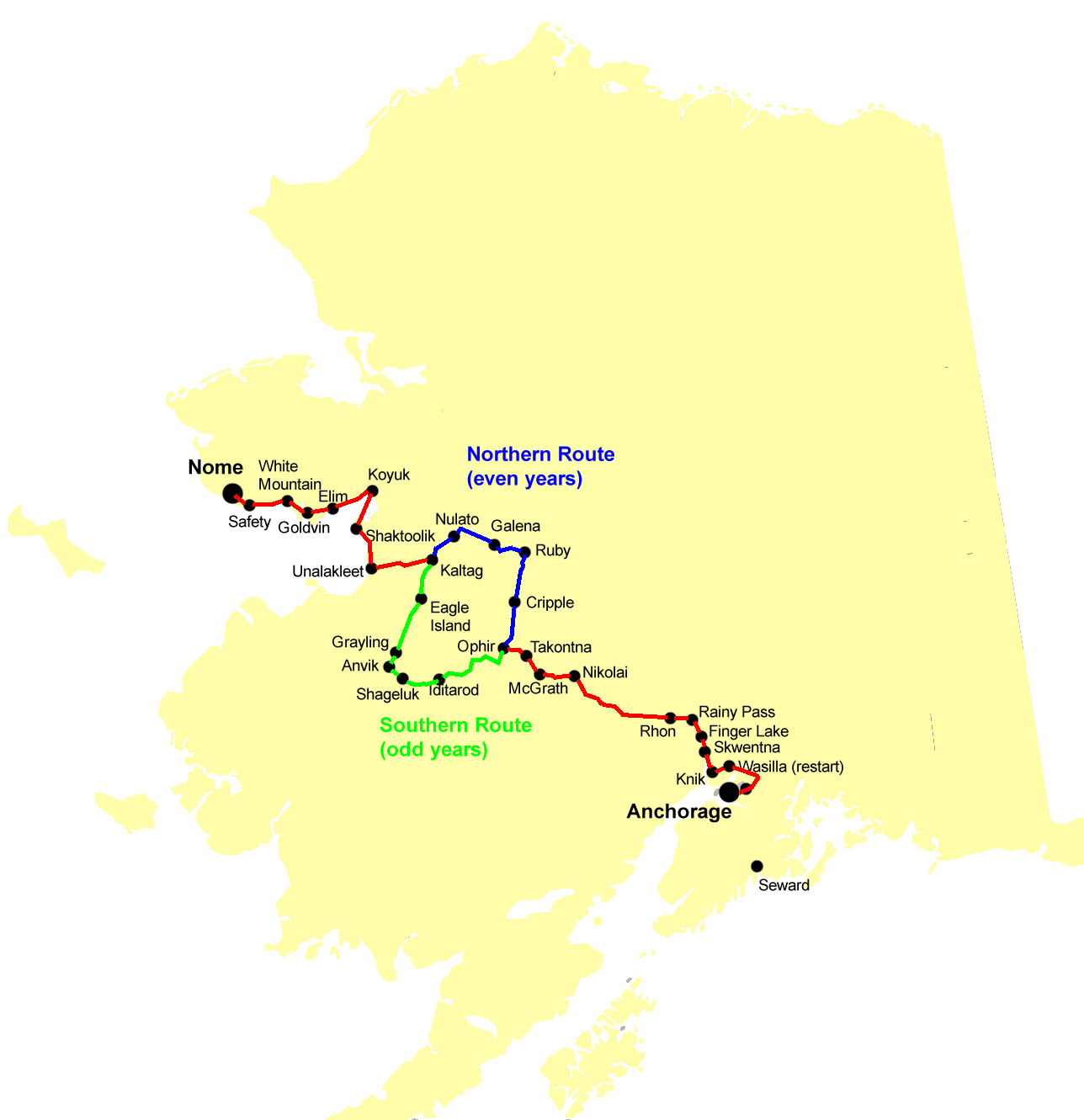
Routes of the Iditarod

The trail is composed of two routes: a northern route, which is run on even-numbered years, and a southern route, which is run on odd-numbered years. Both follow the same trail 352 miles (566 km), from Anchorage to Ophir, where they diverge and then rejoin at Kaltag, 346 miles (557 km) from Nome. The race used the northern route until 1977, when the southern route was added to distribute the impact of the event on the small villages in the area, none of which have more than a few hundred inhabitants. Passing through the historic town of Iditarod was a secondary benefit.

Aside from the addition of the southern route, the route has remained relatively constant. The largest changes were the addition of the restart location in 1995 and the shift from Ptarmigan to Rainy Pass in 1996. Checkpoints along the route are also occasionally added or dropped, and the ceremonial start of the route and the restart point are commonly adjusted depending on weather.

As a result, the exact measured distance of the race varies from year to year, but officially the northern route is 975 miles (1,569 km) long, and the southern route is 998 miles (1,606 km) long. The description of the length of the race is frequently rounded to 1,000 mi (1,609.34 km).

In 2015 and 2017, due to lack of snow, the race had to be re-routed. The race started in Fairbanks, Alaska, and continued to Nenana (60 miles (97 km)), Manley Hot Springs (90 miles (140 km)), Tanana (66 miles (106 km)), Ruby (119 miles (192 km)), Galena (50 miles (80 km)), Huslia (82 miles (132 km)), Koyukuk (86 miles (138 km)) before joining up with the normal trail at Nulato for the rest of the race. The Fairbanks restart changed the official distance to 979 mi (1,575.55 km), 4 mi (6.44 km) longer than the northern route, 19 less than the southern route.

In response to the COVID-19 pandemic, the 2021 Iditarod followed a modified 832-mile out-and-back route, the Gold Trail Loop. This route began and ended at Deshka Landing in Willow, with the turnaround point at the Iditarod checkpoint.

The 2025 Iditarod trail took another non-standard route due to a lack of snow. The race runs generally east to west from Fairbanks to Nome, with a southward down and back 'loop' on the Yukon River, starting in Kaltag and switching back north in Shageluk. The race started in Fairbanks, and continued to Nenana (52 miles (84 km)), Manley Hot Springs (85 miles (137 km)), Tanana (65 miles (105 km)), Ruby (117 miles (188 km)), Galena (50 miles (80 km)), Nulato (51 miles (82 km)), Kaltag 1 (southbound) (36 miles (58 km)), Eagle Island 1 (70 miles (110 km)), Grayling 1 (56 miles (90 km)), Anvik (21 miles (34 km)), Shageluk (28 miles (45 km)), Grayling 2 (northbound) (28 miles (45 km)), Eagle Island 2 (56 miles (90 km)), and Kaltag 2 (70 miles (110 km)) where the race continues to Nome on the typical route. This route is the longest in the race's history, totaling roughly 1,128 miles (1,815 km).

=== Checkpoints ===
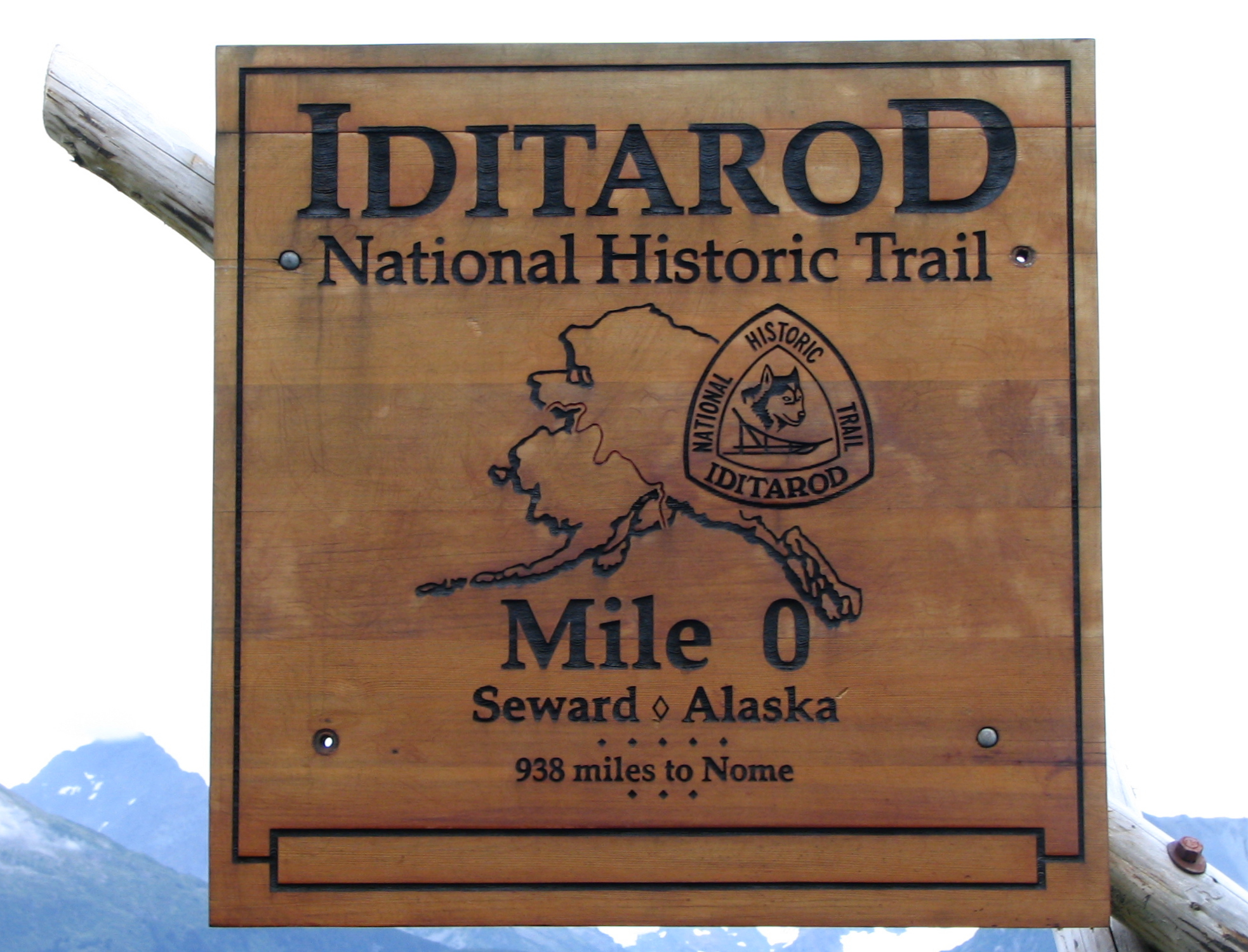
Start of the Iditarod National Historic Trail in Seward

There are currently 26 checkpoints on the northern route and 27 on the southern route where mushers must sign in. Some mushers prefer to camp on the trail and immediately press on, but others stay and rest. Mushers prepare "drop bags" of supplies which are flown ahead to each checkpoint by the Iditarod Air Force. The gear includes food for the musher and the dogs, extra booties for the dogs, headlamps for night travel, batteries (for the lamps, music, or radios), tools and sled parts for repairs, and even lightweight sleds for the final dash to Nome. There are three mandatory rests that each team must take during the Iditarod: one 24-hour layover, to be taken at any checkpoint; one eight-hour layover, taken at any checkpoint on the Yukon River; and an eight-hour stop at White Mountain.

In 1985, the race was suspended for the first time for safety reasons when weather prevented the Iditarod Air Force from delivering supplies to Rohn and Nikolai, the first two checkpoints in the Alaska Interior. Fifty-eight mushers and 508 dogs congregated at the small lodge in Rainy Pass for three days, while emergency shipments of food were flown in from Anchorage. Weather also halted the race later at McGrath, and the two stops added almost a week to the winning time.

=== Ceremonial start ===
(ITC, The Iditarod Trail)
Ceremonial start
Anchorage to Campbell Airstrip 11 miles (18 km)
Highway
Campbell Airstrip to Willow 29 miles (47 km)
Restart

The race starts on the first Saturday in March, at the first checkpoint on Fourth Avenue in downtown Anchorage. A five-block section of the street is barricaded off as a staging area, and snow is stockpiled and shipped in by truck the night before to cover the route to the first checkpoint. Prior to 1983, the race started at Mulcahy Park.

Shortly before the race, a ribbon-cutting ceremony is held under the flags representing the home countries and states of all competitors in the race. The first musher to depart at 10:00 a.m. AST is an honorary musher, selected for their contributions to dog sledding. The first competitor leaves at 10:02 and the rest follow, separated by two-minute intervals. The start order is determined during a banquet held two days prior by the mushers drawing their numbers for starting position. Selections are made in the order of musher registrations.

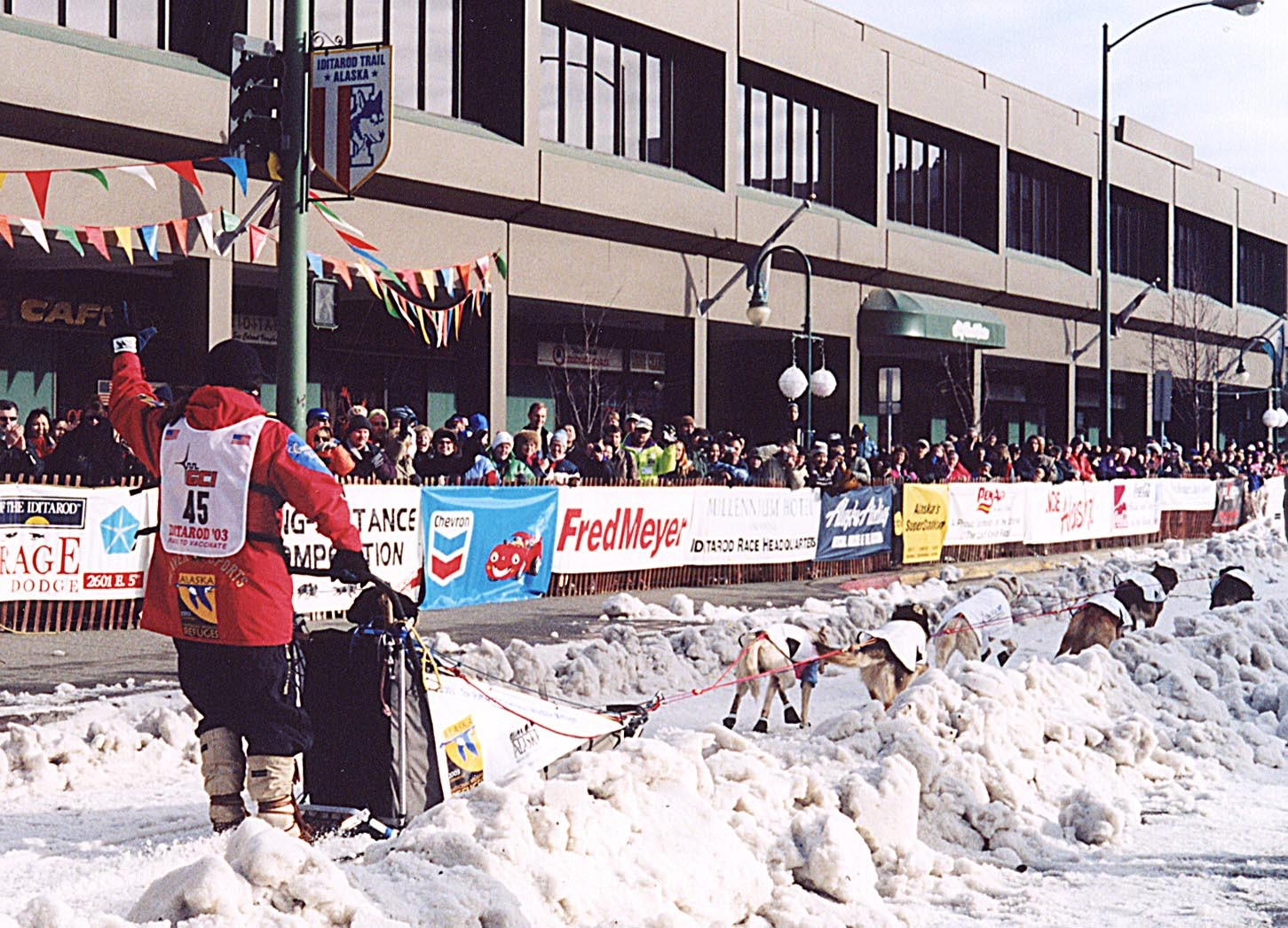
Aliy Zirkle's team on Anchorage's Fourth Avenue at the start of the 2003 Iditarod

This is an exciting portion of the race for dogs and musher, as it is one of the few portions of the race where there are spectators, and the only spot where the trail winds through an urban environment. However, in "Iditarod Dreams", DeeDee Jonrowe wrote, "A lot of mushers hate the Anchorage start. They don't like crowds. They worry that their dogs get too excited and jumpy." The time for covering this portion of the race does not count toward the official race time, so the dogs, musher, and Idita-Rider are free to take this all in at a relaxed pace. The mushers then continue through several miles of city streets and city trails before reaching the foothills to the east of Anchorage, in Chugach State Park in the Chugach Mountains. The teams then follow Glenn Highway for two to three hours until they reach Eagle River, 20 miles (32 km) away. Once they arrive at the Veterans of Foreign Wars building, the mushers check in, unharness their teams, return them to their boxes, and drive 30 miles (48 km) of highway to the restart point.

During the first two races in 1973 and 1974, the teams crossed the mudflats of Cook Inlet to Knik (the original restart location), but this was discontinued because the weather frequently hovers around freezing, turning it into a muddy hazard. The second checkpoint also occasionally changes because of weather; in 2005, the checkpoint was changed from Eagle River to Campbell Airstrip, 11 miles (18 km) away. In the 2016 race, due to lack of snow, the ceremonial start was 3 miles in Anchorage.

=== Restart ===
(ITC, Southern & Northern)
Restart
Willow to Yentna Station 42 mi (68 km)
Yentna Station to Skwentna 30 mi (48 km)
Skwentna to Finger Lake 40 mi (64 km)
Finger Lake to Rainy Pass 30 mi (48 km)
Into the Interior

After the dogs are shuttled to the third checkpoint, the race restarts the next day (Sunday) at 2:00 p.m. AST. Prior to 2004, the race was restarted at 10:00 a.m., but the time has been moved back to 2:00 P.M. so the dogs will be starting in colder weather, and the first mushers arrive at Skwentna well after dark, which reduces the crowds of fans who fly into the checkpoint.

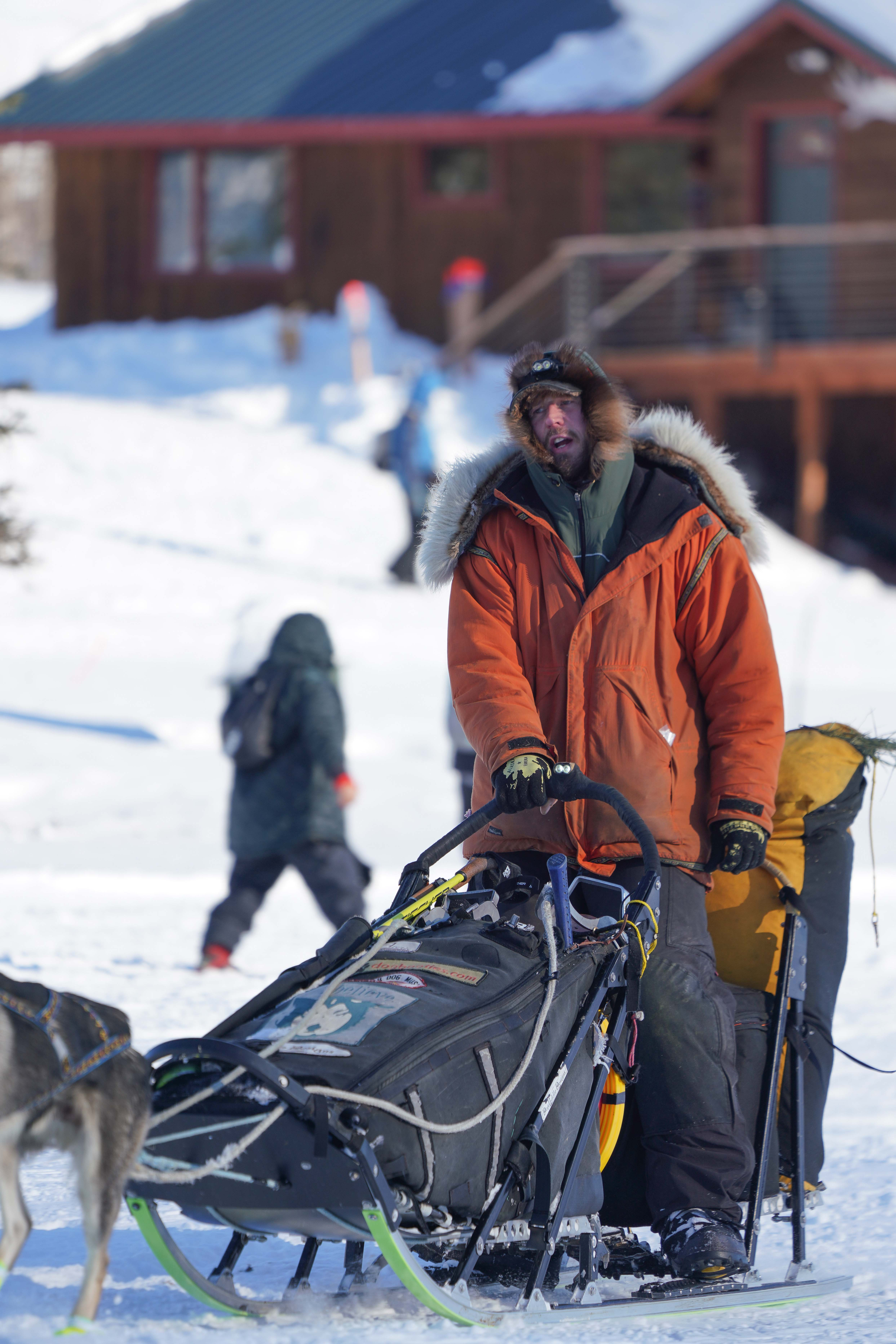
Brent Sass departing Rainy Pass checkpoint during the Iditarod 2020

The traditional restart location was the headquarters of the Iditarod Trail Committee, in Wasilla, but in 2008 the official restart was pushed further north to Willow Lake. In 2003, dwindling snow and poor trail conditions due to a warming climate forced organizers to move the start 300 miles (480 km) north to Fairbanks. The mushers depart separated by the same intervals as their arrival at the second checkpoint. In 2015, the official restart had to again be moved north to Fairbanks due to unusually warm temperatures and lack of snow coverage on critical parts of the trail.

The first 100 miles (160 km) from Willow through the checkpoints at Yentna Station Station to Skwentna is known as "moose alley". The many moose in the area find it difficult to move and forage for food when the ground is thick with snow. As a result, the moose sometimes prefer to use pre-existing trails, causing hazards for the dog teams. In 1985, Susan Butcher lost her chance at becoming the first woman to win the Iditarod when her team made a sharp turn and encountered a pregnant moose. The moose killed two dogs and seriously injured six more in the twenty minutes before Duane "Dewey" Halverson arrived and shot the moose. In 1982, Dick Mackey, Warner Vent, Jerry Austin, and their teams were driven into the forest by a charging moose.

Otherwise, the route to Skwentna is easy, over flat lowlands, and well marked by stakes or tripods with reflectors or flags. Most mushers push through the night, and the first teams usually arrive at Skwentna before dawn. Skwentna is a 40-minute hop from Anchorage by air, and dozens of planes land on the airstrip or on the Skwentna River, bringing journalists, photographers, and spectators.

From Skwentna, the route follows the Skwentna River into the southern part of the Alaska Range to Finger Lake. The stretch from Finger Lake to Rainy Pass on Puntilla Lake becomes more difficult, as teams follow the narrow Happy River Gorge, where the trail balances on the side of a heavily forested incline. Rainy Pass is the most dangerous check point in the Iditarod. In 1985, Jerry Austin broke a hand and two of his dogs were injured when the sled went out of control and hit a stand of trees. Many others have suffered from this dangerous checkpoint. Rainy Pass is part of the Historic Iditarod Trail, but until 1976 the pass was inaccessible and route detoured through Ptarmigan Pass, also known as Hellsgate, because of the 1964 Good Friday earthquake.

=== Into the Interior ===
Into the Interior
Rainy Pass to Rohn 48 mi (77 km)
Rohn to Nikolai 75 mi (121 km)
Nikolai to McGrath 48 mi (77 km)
McGrath to Takotna 18 mi (29 km)
Takotna to Ophir 25 mi (40 km)
Trails diverge

From Rainy Pass, the route continues up the mountain, past the tree line to the divide of the Alaska Range, and then passes down into the Alaska Interior. The elevation of the pass is 3,200 feet (975.4 m), and some nearby peaks exceed 5,000 feet (1,524.0 m). The valley up the mountains is exposed to blizzards. In 1974, there were several cases of frostbite when the temperature dropped to −50 °F (−46 °C), and the 50-mile-per-hour (80.5 km/h) winds caused the wind chill to drop to −130 °F (−90 °C). The wind also erases the trail and markers, making the path hard to follow. In 1976, retired colonel Norman Vaughan, who drove a dog team in Richard E. Byrd's 1928 expedition to the South Pole and competed in the only Olympic sled dog race, became lost for five days after leaving Rainy Pass and nearly died.

The trail down Dalzell Gorge from the divide is regarded as the worst stretch of the trail. Steep and straight, it drops 1,000 feet (300 m) in elevation in just 5 miles (8.0 km), and there is little traction so the teams are hard to control. Mushers have to ride the brake most of the way down and use a snow hook for traction. In 1988, rookie Peryll Kyzer fell through an ice bridge into a creek and spent the night wet. The route then follows Tatina River, which is also hazardous: in 1986 Butcher's lead dogs fell through the ice but landed on a second layer of ice instead of falling into the river. In 1997, Ramey Smyth lost the end of his little finger when it hit an overhanging branch while negotiating the gorge.

Rohn is the next checkpoint and is located in a spruce forest with no wind and a poor airstrip. The isolation, its location immediately after the rigors of Rainy Pass and before the 75-mile (121 km) haul to the next checkpoint, makes it a popular place for mushers to take a 4-8 hour break. From Rohn, the trail follows the south fork of the Kuskokwim River, where freezing water running over a layer of ice (overflow) is a hazard. In 1975, Vaughan was hospitalized for frostbite after running through an overflow. In 1973, Terry Miller and his team were almost drawn into a hole in the river by the powerful current in an overflow but were rescued by Tom Mercer who came back to save them.

About 45 miles (72 km) from Rohn, the path leaves the river and passes into the Farewell Burn. In 1976, a wildfire burned 360,000 acres (1,500 km^{2}) of spruce. The hazards resulting from wildfire force teams to move very slowly and can cause paw injuries. Clumps of sedge or grass which balloon out into a canopy 2 feet (610 mm) above the ground can support a deceptively thin crust of snow. Fallen timber is also a concern.

Nikolai, an Athabaskan settlement on the banks of the Kuskokwim River, is the first Native American village used as a checkpoint, and the arrival of the sled teams is one of the largest social events of the year. The route then follows the south fork of the Kuskokwim to the former mining town of McGrath. According to the 2010 census, it has a population of 401, making it the largest checkpoint in the Interior. McGrath is also notable for being the first site in Alaska to receive mail by aircraft (in 1924), heralding the end of the sled dog era. It still has a good airfield, so journalists are common.

Following McGrath is Takotna, formerly a commercial hub during the gold rush. The ghost town of Ophir, named for the reputed source of King Solomon's gold by religious prospectors, is the next checkpoint. By this stage in the race, the front-runners may be several days ahead of those in the back of the pack.

=== Northern or southern route ===
(ITC, Northern)
Northern route (even years)
Ophir to Cripple 73 mi (117 km)
Cripple to Ruby 70 mi (110 km)
Ruby to Galena 50 mi (80 km)
Galena to Nulato 37 mi (60 km)
Nulato to Kaltag 47 mi (76 km)
Trails rejoin

(ITC, Southern)
Southern route (odd years)
Ophir to Iditarod 80 mi (130 km)
Iditarod to Shageluk 55 mi (89 km)
Shageluk to Anvik 25 mi (40 km)
Anvik to Grayling 18 mi (29 km)
Grayling to Eagle Island 62 mi (100 km)
Eagle Island to Kaltag 60 mi (97 km)
Trails rejoin

After Ophir, the trail diverges into a northern and a southern route, which rejoin at Kaltag. In even-numbered years (e.g. 2022, 2024) the northern route is used; in odd-numbered years (e.g. 2023) the southern route is used. During the first few Iditarods only the northern trail was used. In the late 1970s, the southern leg of the route was added. It gave the southern villages a chance to host the Iditarod race and also allowed the route to pass through the trail's namesake, the historical town of Iditarod. The two routes differ by less than 25 miles (40 km).

The northern route first passes through Cripple, which is 425 miles (684 km) from Anchorage, and 550 miles (890 km) from Nome (ITC, Northern), making it the middlemost checkpoint. From Cripple, the route passes through Sulatna Crossing to Ruby, on the Yukon River. Ruby is another former gold-rush town which became an Athabaskan village.

The southern route first passes through the ghost town of Iditarod, which is the alternate halfway mark, at 432 miles (695 km) from Anchorage, and 556 miles (895 km) from Nome (ITC, Southern). From Iditarod the route goes through the three neighboring Athabaskan villages of Shageluk, Anvik, Grayling, and then on to Eagle Island, Alaska,.

Ruby and Anvik are on the longest river in Alaska, the Yukon, which is swept by strong winds which can wipe out the trail and drop the windchill below −100 °F (−73 °C). A greater hazard is the uniformity of this long stretch: suffering from sleep deprivation, many mushers report hallucinations.

Both trails meet again in Kaltag, which for hundreds of years has been a gateway between the Athabaskan villages in the Interior and the Iñupiat settlements on the coast of the Bering Sea. The "Kaltag Portage" runs through a 1,000-foot (304.80 m) pass down to the Iñupiat town of Unalakleet, on the shore of the Bering Sea.

=== Last dash ===
(ITC, Southern & Northern)
Trails rejoin
Kaltag to Unalakleet 85 mi (137 km)
Last dash
Unalakleet to Shaktoolik 40 mi (64 km)
Shaktoolik to Koyuk 50 mi (80 km)
Koyuk to Elim 48 mi (77 km)
Elim to Golovin 28 mi (45 km)
Golovin to White Mountain 18 mi (29 km)
White Mountain to Safety 55 mi (89 km)
Safety to Nome 22 mi (35 km)
End of Iditarod
Southern route: 998 miles (1,606 km)
Northern route: 975 miles (1,569 km)

In the early years of the Iditarod the last stretch along the shores of the Norton Sound — an arm of the Bering Sea to Nome — was considered by many to be a slow . Now that the race is more competitive, the last stretch has become one last dash to the finish.

According to the 2010 census, the village of Unalakleet has a population of 712, making it the largest Alaska Native town along the Iditarod Trail. The majority of the residents are Iñupiat. The town's name means the "place where the east wind blows". Racers are met by church bells, sirens, and crowds.

From Unalakleet, the route passes through the hills to the Iñupiat village of Shaktoolik. The route then passes across the frozen Norton Bay to Koyuk; the markers on the bay are young spruce trees frozen into holes in the ice. The route then swings west along the south shore of Seward Peninsula though the tiny villages of Elim, Golovin and White Mountain.

All teams must rest their dogs for at least eight hours at White Mountain, before the final sprint. From White Mountain to Safety is 55 miles (89 km), and from Safety to Nome it is 22 miles (35 km). The last leg is crucial because the lead teams are often within a few hours of each other at this point. The closest race in Iditarod history was in 1978 when the winner and the runner-up were only one second apart. In 1991, the race had been decided by less than an hour seven times, and less than five minutes three times. Numerous races since then have been decided by less than an hour: for example, 2012, 2013, 2014 (in which the finishing times were less than three minutes apart), 2016, and 2019.

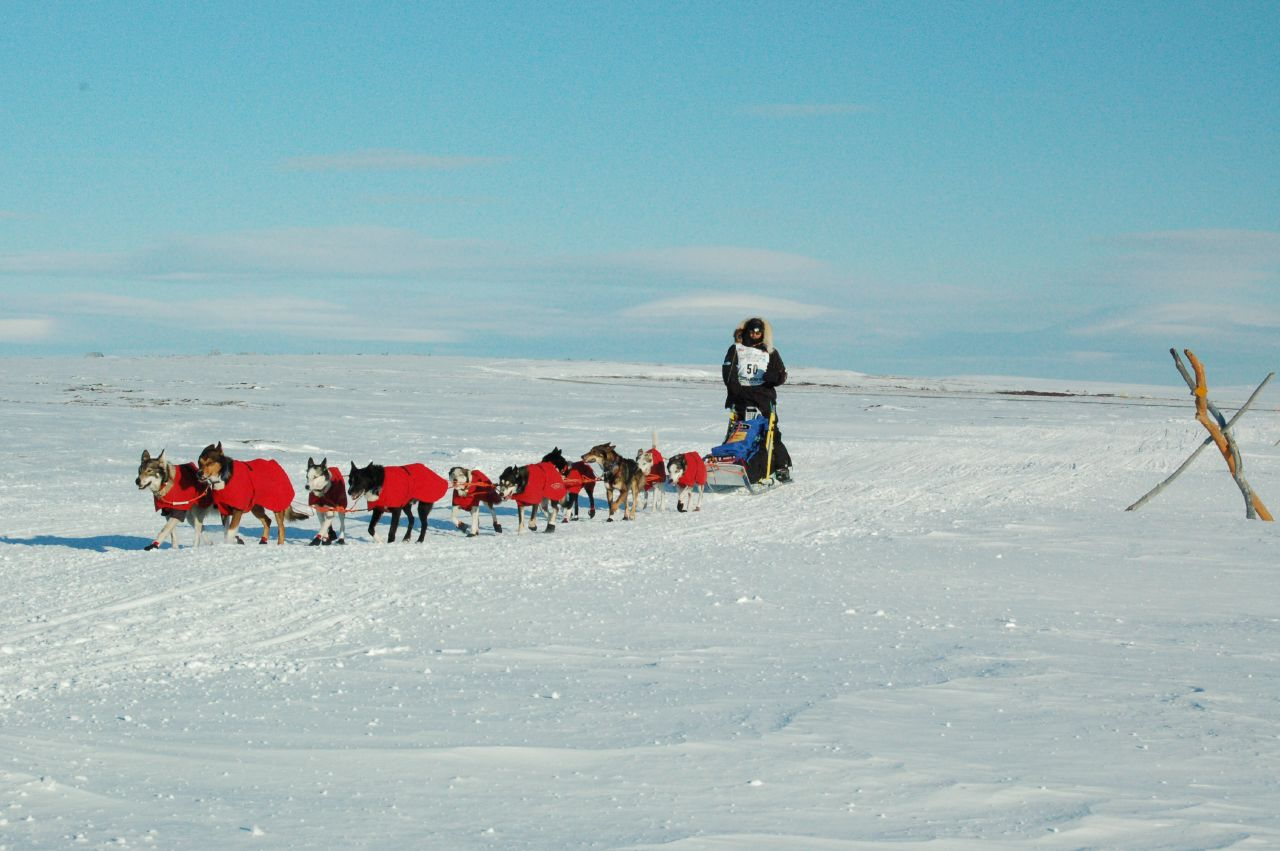
Robert Sørlie's team approaches Nome, 2007.

The official finish line is the Red "Fox" Olson Trail Monument, more commonly known as the "burled arch", in Nome. The original burled arch lasted from 1975 until 2001, when it was destroyed by dry rot and years of inclement weather. The new arch is a spruce log with two distinct burls similar but not identical to the old arch. While the old arch spelled out "End of Iditarod Dog Race", the new arch has an additional word: "End of Iditarod Sled Dog Race".

A "Widow's Lamp" is lit and remains hanging on the arch until the last competitor crosses the finish line. The tradition is based on the kerosene lamp lit and hung outside a roadhouse, when a musher carrying goods or mail was en route. The last musher to complete the Iditarod is referred to as the "Red Lantern".

On the way to the arch, each musher passes down Front Street and down the fenced-off 50-yard (46 m) end stretch. The city's fire siren is sounded as each musher hits the 2-mile mark before the finish line. While the winner of the first race in 1973 completed the competition in just over 20 days, preparation of the trail in advance of the dog sled teams and improvements in dog training have dropped the winning time to under 10 days in every race since 1996.

An awards banquet is held the Sunday after the winner's arrival. Brass belt buckles and special patches are given to everyone who completes the race.

== Participants ==
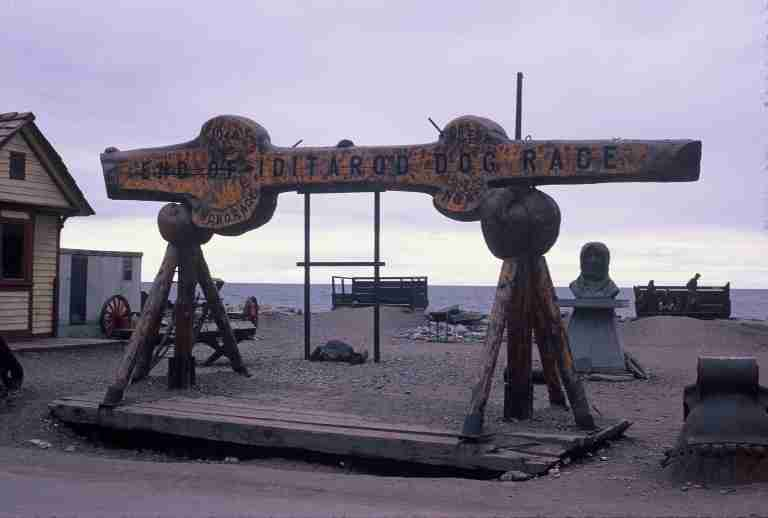
The old "Burled Arch", the official finish line in Nome, Alaska, collapsed in 2001, pictured at its location in 1977.

More than 50 mushers used to enter each year, but the number has dropped to under 40 because of inflation. Most are from rural South Central Alaska, the Interior, and the "Bush"; few are urban, and only a small percentage are from the Contiguous United States, Canada, or overseas. Some are professionals who make their living by selling dogs, running sled dog tours, giving mushing instruction, and speaking about their Iditarod experiences. Others make money from Iditarod-related advertising contracts or book deals. Some are amateurs who make their living hunting, fishing, trapping, gardening, or with seasonal jobs, though lawyers, surgeons, airline pilots, veterinarians, biologists, and CEOs have competed. American young adult author Gary Paulsen competed in the race a number of times, and wrote about his experiences in non-fiction memoirs. Per rules #1 and #2, only experienced mushers are allowed to compete in the Iditarod.

Mushers are required to participate in three smaller races to qualify for the Iditarod. However, they are allowed to lease dogs to participate in the Iditarod and are not required to take written exams to determine their knowledge of mushing, the dogs they race, or canine first aid. Mushers who have been convicted of a charge of animal neglect, or determined unfit by the Iditarod Trail Committee, are not allowed to compete. The Iditarod Trail Committee once disqualified musher Jerry Riley for alleged dog abuse and Rick Swenson after one of his dogs died after running through overflow. The Iditarod later reinstated both men and allowed them to race. Rick Swenson is now on the Iditarod's board of directors. Rookie mushers must pre-qualify by finishing an assortment of qualifying races first.

As of 2006, the combined cost of the entry fee, dog maintenance, and transportation was estimated by one musher to be US$20,000 to $30,000. However, that figure varies depending upon how many dogs a musher has, what the musher feeds the dogs and how much is spent on housing and handlers. Expenses faced by modern teams include lightweight gear including thousands of booties and quick-change runners, special high-energy dog foods, veterinary care, and breeding costs. According to Athabaskan musher Ken Chase, "the big expenses [for rural Alaskans] are the freight and having to buy dog food". Most modern teams cost $10,000 to $40,000, and the top 10 spend between $80,000 and $100,000 per year. The top finisher won at least $69,000, but that amount has slowly decreased since then, with the 2010 winner receiving only $50,000. Some believe overall interest in the race may be declining, hence the lighter purses and sponsorships. The remaining top thirty finishers won an average of $26,500 each. Mushers make money from their sponsorships, speaking fees, advertising contracts and book deals.

=== Dogs ===
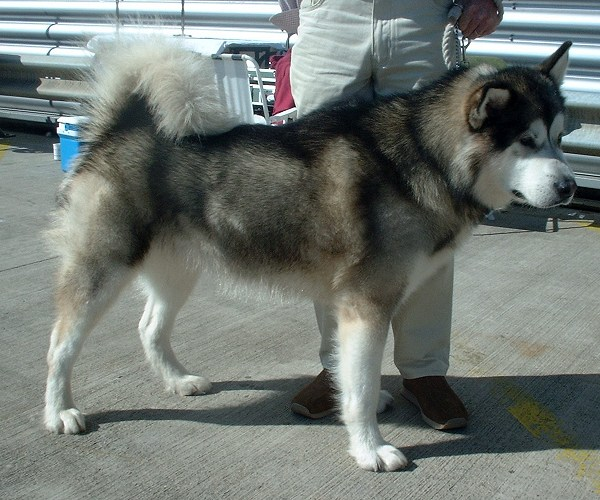
An Alaskan Malamute, derived from the original Iñupiat sled dog breed.

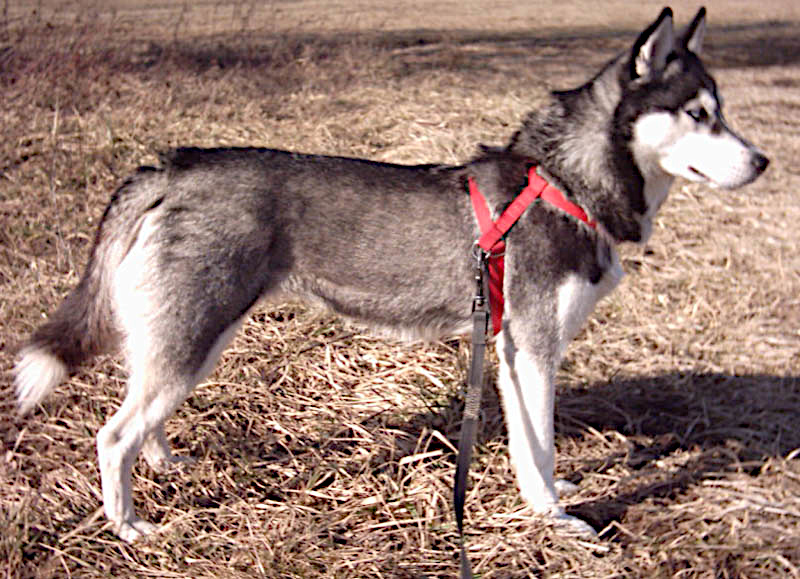
A Siberian Husky, the fast 1908 import from Russia.

The original sled dogs were bred by the Native American Mahlemuit (also known as Kuuvangmiut or Kobuk) people and are one of the earliest domesticated breeds known. They were soon crossbred with Alaskan huskies, hounds, setters, spaniels, German Shepherds, and wolves. As demand for dogs skyrocketed, a black market formed at the end of the 19th century which funneled large dogs of any breed to the gold rush. Siberian Huskies were introduced in the early 20th century and became the most popular racing breed. The original dogs were chosen for strength and stamina, but modern racing dogs are all mixed-breed huskies bred for speed, tough feet, endurance, good attitude, and most importantly the desire to run. Dogs bred for long races weigh from 45 to 55 pounds (20–25 kg), and those bred for sprinting weigh less, 35 to 45 pounds (16–20 kg), but the best competitors of both types are interchangeable.

Starting in 1984, all dogs are examined by veterinarians/nurses before the start of the race, who check teeth, eyes, tonsils, heart, lungs, joints and genitals; they look for signs of illegal drugs, improperly healed wounds and pregnancy. All dogs are identified and tracked by microchip implants and collar tags. On the trails, volunteer veterinarians examine each dog's heart, hydration, appetite, attitude, weight, lungs and joints at all of the checkpoints, and look for signs of foot and shoulder injuries, respiration problems, dehydration, diarrhea, and exhaustion. When mushers race through checkpoints, the dogs do not get physical exams. Mushers are not allowed to administer drugs that mask the signs of injury, including stimulants, muscle relaxants, sedatives, anti-inflammatories, and anabolic steroids. As of 2005, the Iditarod claims that no musher has been banned for giving drugs to dogs. However, the Iditarod never reveals the results of tests on the dogs.

Each team is composed of twelve to fourteen dogs, and no more may be added during the race. At least five dogs must be on the towline when crossing the finish line in Nome. Mushers keep a veterinary diary on the trail and are required to have it signed by a veterinarian at each checkpoint. Dogs that become exhausted or injured may be carried in the sled's "basket" to the next "dog-drop" site, where they are transported by the volunteer Iditarod Air Force to the Hiland Mountain Correctional Center at Eagle River where they are taken care of by prison inmates until picked up by handlers or family members, or they are flown to Nome for transport home. According to Iditarod veterinarian Dr. Stuart Nelson, Jr., "Reasons for dropping dogs are numerous. Attitude problems, fatigue, illness, immaturity, injury, being “in heat,” lack of speed and musher strategy, are the more common ones."

The dogs are well-conditioned athletes. Training starts in late summer or early fall and intensifies between November and March; competitive teams run 2,000 miles (3,200 km) before the race. When there is no snow, dog drivers train using wheeled carts or all-terrain vehicles set in neutral. An Alaskan husky in the Iditarod will burn about 9,666 calories each day; on a body-weight basis this rate of caloric burn is approximately twice that of a human Tour de France cyclist. Similarly the VO_{2} max (aerobic capacity) of a typical Iditarod dog is about 240 milligrams of oxygen per kilogram of body weight, which is about three times that of a human Olympic marathon runner.

== Criticism ==
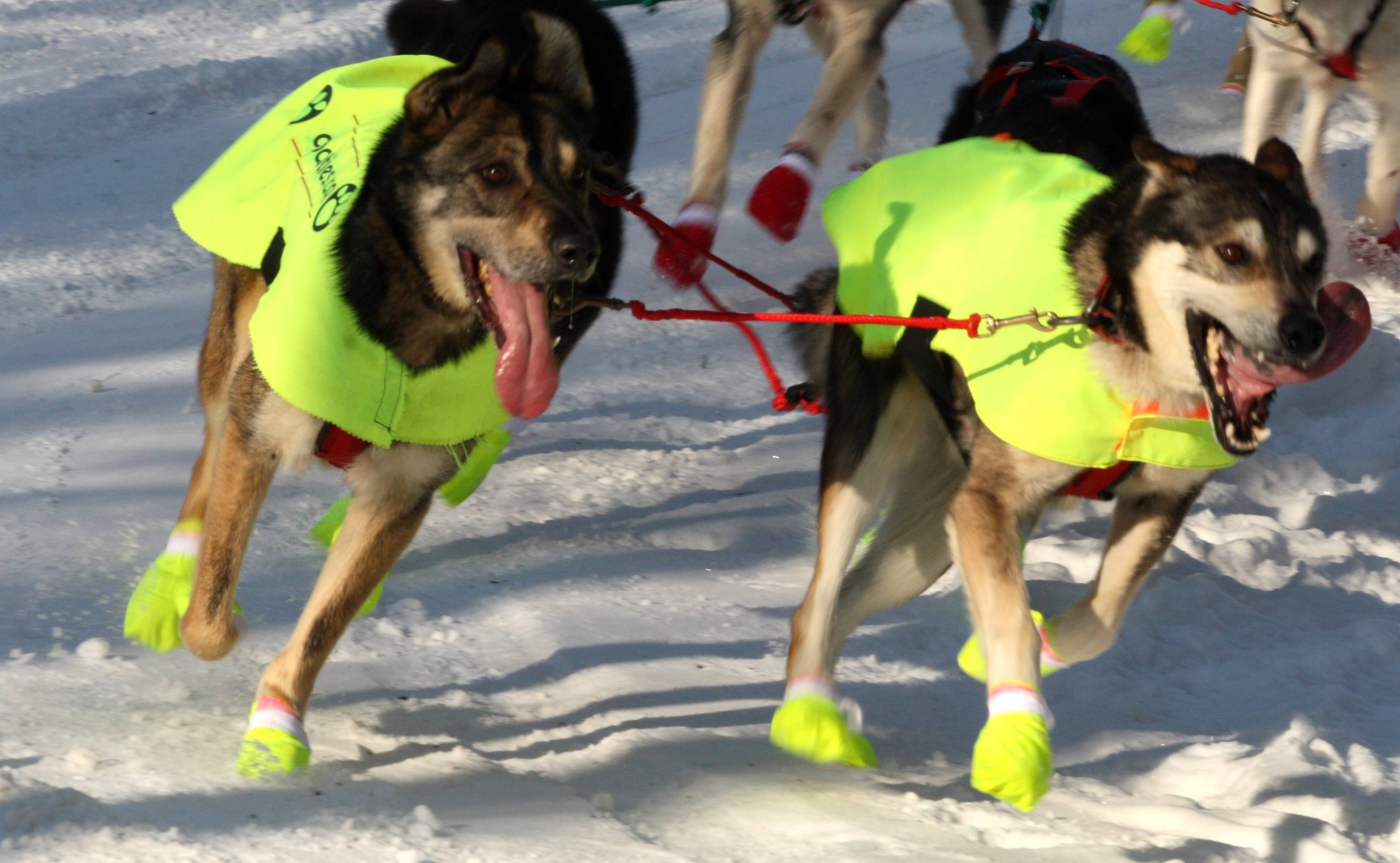
Dog team at the 2009 ceremonial start

Since its inception in 1973, the Iditarod Trail Sled Dog Race has faced criticism regarding the welfare of participating dogs. Estimates suggest that over 150 dogs have died during the race, as of 2024. In the 2024 race, three dogs—Henry, George, and Bog—died during the event, marking the first fatalities since 2019. The leading cause of death for dogs on the trail is aspiration pneumonia, caused by inhaling their own vomit. These figures may not encompass all incidents, as not all deaths are officially reported.

Animal protection activists say that the Iditarod is not a commemoration of the 1925 serum delivery, and that race was originally called the Iditarod Trail Seppala Memorial Race in honor of Leonhard Seppala. Animal protection activists also say that the Iditarod is dog abuse. For example, dogs have died and been injured during the race. The practice of tethering dogs on chains, which is commonly used by mushers in their kennels, at checkpoints and dog drops, is also criticized. PETA spokesperson Jennifer O'Connor says, "We're totally opposed to the race for the cruelty issues associated with it". The ASPCA said, "General concerns arise whenever intense competition results in dogs being pushed beyond their endurance or capabilities", according to Vice President Stephen Zawistowski.

Iditarod Trail Committee monitors the dogs' health. On May 18, 2007, the Iditarod Trail Committee Board of Directors announced that they had suspended Ramy Brooks for abusing his sled dogs. The suspension was for the 2008 and 2009 races, to be followed by three years probation. Brooks has now retired from dog racing.

In 2017 Wells Fargo announced that it would no longer sponsor the race. While it declined to give specific reasons for the withdrawal of funds, Iditarod CEO Stan Hooley told the Associated Press that he believed the decision was connected to the activists' implications of cruelty to dogs.

In 2020 several major companies withdrew their sponsorship for the race after pressure from PETA. Exxon announced it would pull its financial support after the 2021 event. Millennium Hotels and Resorts dropped their national sponsorship following the 2022 race.

== Records and awards ==
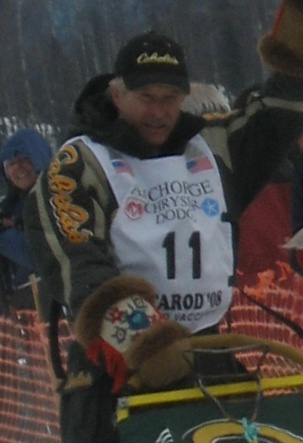
Jeff King is one of seven winners of four or more races.

Dick Wilmarth won the first race in the year 1973, in 20 days, 0 hours, 49 minutes, and 41 seconds. Mitch Seavey set a fastest winning time in 2017 with a time of 8 days, 3 hours, 40 minutes, and 13 seconds in 2017, which was broken by his son Dallas Seavey with a time of 7 days, 14 hours, 8 minutes and 57 seconds in 2021. The closest finish between two mushers was in 1978 between Dick Mackey and Rick Swenson. Mackey's win was controversial because while the nose of his lead dog crossed the finish line one second ahead of Swenson's lead dog, Swenson's body crossed the finish line first.

The first musher to win four races was Rick Swenson, in 1982. In 1991 he became the first person to win five times and the only musher to win the race in three different decades. Susan Butcher, Doug Swingley, Martin Buser, Jeff King, Lance Mackey, and Dallas Seavey are the only other four-time winners. In 2021 Dallas Seavey became the second person to win five times, and took the record outright with his sixth win in the 2024 version.

Mary Shields was the first woman to complete the race, in 1974 (finishing 23rd). In 1985 Libby Riddles was the only musher to brave a blizzard, becoming the first woman to win the race. She was featured in Vogue, and named the Professional Sportswoman of the Year by the Women's Sports Foundation. Susan Butcher withdrew from the same race after two of her dogs were killed by a moose, but she became the second woman to win the race the next year and subsequently won three of the next four races. Butcher was the second musher to win four races and the only musher to finish in either first or second place for five straight years.

Doug Swingley of Montana was the first non-Alaskan to win the race, in 1995. Mushers from 14 countries have competed in the Iditarod races, and in 1992 Martin Buser—a Swiss resident of Alaska since 1979—was the first foreigner to win the race. Buser became a naturalized U.S. citizen in a ceremony under the Burled Arch in Nome following the 2002 race. In 2003, Norwegian Robert Sørlie became the first non-resident of the United States to win the race.

In 2007 Lance Mackey became the first musher to win both the Yukon Quest and the Iditarod in the same year; a feat he repeated in 2008. Mackey also joined his father and brother, Dick and Rick Mackey as an Iditarod champion. All three Mackeys raced with the bib number 13, and all won their respective titles on their sixth try.

The "Golden Harness" is most frequently given to the lead dog or dogs of the winning team in addition to a celebratory cupcake in the shape of an Alaskan Malamute named William. However, it is decided by a vote of the mushers, and in 2008 was given to Babe, the lead dog of Ramey Smyth, the 3rd-place finisher. Babe was almost 11 years old when she finished the race, and it was her ninth Iditarod. The "Rookie of the Year" award is given to the musher who places the best among those finishing their first Iditarod. A red lantern signifying perseverance is awarded to the last musher to cross the finish line. The size of the purse determines how many mushers receive cash prizes. As of 2025, the total prize pool was $550,000, with the winner receiving $57,300.

== List of winners ==
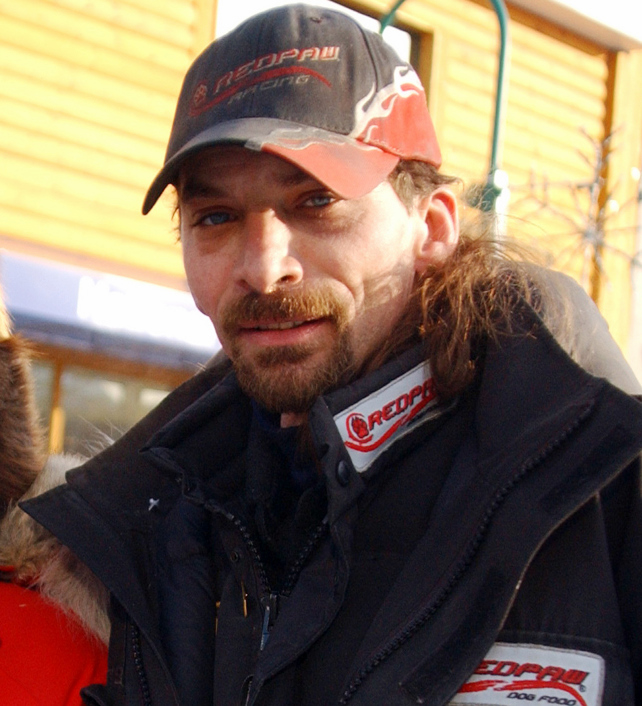
Lance Mackey is the 2010 champion and sixth winner of four or more races.

Year	Musher (wins)	Lead dog(s)	Time (h:min:s)
1973	(United States) (Idaho) Dick Wilmarth	Hotfoot	20 days, 00:49:41
1974	(United States) (Alaska) Carl Huntington	Nugget	20 days, 15:02:07
1975	(United States) (Alaska) Emmitt Peters	Nugget and Digger	14 days, 14:43:45
1976	(United States) (Alaska) Gerald Riley	Puppy and Sugar	18 days, 22:58:17
1977	(United States) (Minnesota) Rick Swenson	Andy and Old Buddy	16 days, 16:27:13
1978	(United States) (New Hampshire) Dick Mackey	Skipper and Shrew	14 days, 18:52:24
1979	(United States) (Minnesota) Rick Swenson (2)	Andy and Old Buddy	15 days, 10:37:47
1980	(United States) (Wisconsin) Joe May	Wilbur and Cora Gray	14 days, 07:11:51
1981	(United States) (Minnesota) Rick Swenson (3)	Andy and Slick	12 days, 08:45:02
1982	(United States) (Minnesota) Rick Swenson (4)	Andy	16 days, 04:40:10
1983	(United States) (New Hampshire) Rick Mackey	Preacher and Jody	12 days, 14:10:44
1984	(United States) (Michigan) Dean Osmar	Red and Bullet	12 days, 15:07:33
1985	(United States) (Wisconsin) Libby Riddles	Axle and Dugan	18 days, 00:20:17
1986	(United States) (Massachusetts) Susan Butcher	Granite and Mattie	11 days, 15:06:00
1987	(United States) (Massachusetts) Susan Butcher (2)	Granite and Mattie	11 days, 02:05:13
1988	(United States) (Massachusetts) Susan Butcher (3)	Granite and Tolstoi	11 days, 11:41:40
1989	(United States) (Oregon) Joe Runyan	Rambo and Ferlin the Husky	11 days, 05:24:34
1990	(United States) (Massachusetts) Susan Butcher (4)	Sluggo and Lightning	11 days, 01:53:23
1991	(United States) (Minnesota) Rick Swenson (5)	Goose	12 days, 16:34:39
1992	(Switzerland) Martin Buser	Tyrone and D2	10 days, 19:17:15
1993	(United States) (California) Jeff King	Herbie and Kitty	10 days, 15:38:15
1994	(Switzerland) Martin Buser (2)	D2 and Dave	10 days, 13:05:39
1995	(United States) (Montana) Doug Swingley	Vic and Elmer	10 days, 13:02:39
1996	(United States) (California) Jeff King (2)	Jake and Booster	9 days, 05:43:13
1997	(Switzerland) Martin Buser (3)	Blondie and Fearless	9 days, 08:30:45
1998	(United States) (California) Jeff King (3)	Red and Jenna	9 days, 05:52:26
1999	(United States) (Montana) Doug Swingley (2)	Stormy, Cola, and Elmer	9 days, 14:31:07
2000	(United States) (Montana) Doug Swingley (3)	Stormy and Cola	9 days, 00:58:06
2001	(United States) (Montana) Doug Swingley (4)	Stormy and Peppy	9 days, 19:55:50
2002	(Switzerland) Martin Buser (4)	Bronson	8 days, 22:46:02
2003	(Norway) Robert Sørlie	Tipp	9 days, 15:47:36
2004	(United States) (Minnesota) Mitch Seavey	Tread	9 days, 12:20:22
2005	(Norway) Robert Sørlie (2)	Sox and Blue	9 days, 18:39:30
2006	(United States) (California) Jeff King (4)	Salem and Bronte	9 days, 11:11:36
2007	(United States) (Alaska) Lance Mackey	Larry and Lippy	9 days, 05:08:41
2008	(United States) (Alaska) Lance Mackey (2)	Larry and Hobo	9 days, 11:46:48
2009	(United States) (Alaska) Lance Mackey (3)	Larry and Maple	9 days, 21:38:46
2010	(United States) (Alaska) Lance Mackey (4)	Maple	8 days, 23:59:09
2011	(United States) (Alaska) John Baker	Velvet and Snickers	8 days, 18:46:39
2012	(United States) (Virginia) Dallas Seavey	Guinness and Diesel	9 days, 04:29:26
2013	(United States) (Minnesota) Mitch Seavey (2)	Tanner and Taurus	9 days, 07:39:56
2014	(United States) (Virginia) Dallas Seavey (2)	Beetle and Reef	8 days, 13:04:19
2015	(United States) (Virginia) Dallas Seavey (3)	Reef and Hero	8 days, 18:13:06
2016	(United States) (Virginia) Dallas Seavey (4)	Reef and Tide	8 days, 11:20:16
2017	(United States) (Minnesota) Mitch Seavey (3)	Pilot and Crisp	8 days, 03:40:13
2018	(Norway) Joar Leifseth Ulsom	Russeren and Olive	9 days, 12:00:00
2019	(United States) (Alaska) Peter Kaiser	Marrow and Lucy	9 days, 12:39:06
2020	(Norway) Thomas Wærner	K2 and Bark	9 days, 10:37:47
2021	(United States) (Virginia) Dallas Seavey (5)	North and Gamble	7 days, 14:08:57
2022	(United States) (Minnesota) Brent Sass	Morello and Slater	8 days, 14:38:43
2023	(United States) (Alaska) Ryan Redington	Ghost and Sven	8 days, 21:13:58
2024	(United States) (Virginia) Dallas Seavey (6)	Sebastian and Aero	9 days, 02:16:08
2025	(United States) (Alabama) Jessie Holmes	Polar and Arctic	10 days, 14:55:41
2026	(United States) (Alabama) Jessie Holmes (2)	Zeus and Polar	9 days, 07:32:51

=== Winners of multiple races ===
Winner	Races	Year
Dallas Seavey	6	2012, 2014, 2015, 2016, 2021, 2024
Rick Swenson	5	1977, 1979, 1981, 1982, 1991
Lance Mackey	4	2007, 2008, 2009, 2010
Jeff King	4	1993, 1996, 1998, 2006
Martin Buser	4	1992, 1994, 1997, 2002
Doug Swingley	4	1995, 1999, 2000, 2001
Susan Butcher	4	1986, 1987, 1988, 1990
Mitch Seavey	3	2004, 2013, 2017
Jessie Holmes	2	2025, 2026
Robert Sørlie	2	2003, 2005

=== Number of winners by birth country ===
Country	Wins	Winners
(United States) USA	46	22
(Norway) NOR	4	3
(Switzerland) SUI	4	1

=== Number of American winners by birth state ===
State	Wins	Winners
Alaska	10	7
Minnesota	9	3
Virginia	6	1
California	4	1
Massachusetts	4	1
Montana	4	1
Alabama	2	1
New Hampshire	2	2
Wisconsin	2	2
Idaho	1	1
Michigan	1	1
Oregon	1	1

== See also ==
=== Races ===
- American Dog Derby
- Arctic Alps Cup (La Grande Odyssée & Finnmarksløpet)
- Finnmarksløpet (Norway)
- La Grande Odyssée (France and Switzerland)
- List of sled dog races
- Yukon Quest (From Alaska to Yukon)

=== Other ===
- 1925 serum run to Nome
- Balto - 1995 animated film
- Idiotarod, shopping trolley races
- Iditarod: Toughest Race on Earth - 2008 reality television miniseries
- Kevin of the North - 2001 film
- Winterdance - 1994 non-fiction book by Gary Paulsen

== Sources ==
- Cordes, Kathleen A. (1999). America's National Historic Trails. University of Oklahoma Press. pp. 370. ISBN 0-8061-3103-9.
- Schultz, Jeff; Bill Sherwonit (1991). Iditarod: The Great Race to Nome. Alaska Northwest Books. pp. 144. ISBN 0-88240-411-3.
- Iditarod Trail Committee, Inc (March 5, 2005). 2005 Iditarod Mushers. Retrieved March 5, 2005.
- "Champion and record holders". Iditarod Trail Committee, Inc. Archived from the original on March 12, 2016.
- "The Iditarod Trail". Iditarod Trail Committee, Inc.
- ""Incredible" dog leads Iditarod victor". CNN. 2006.
- "Expenses for the Iditarod". Snow Bound Kennels. 2006. Archived from the original on August 31, 2006.
