= Alaska Sports Hall of Fame =

American sports recognition museum

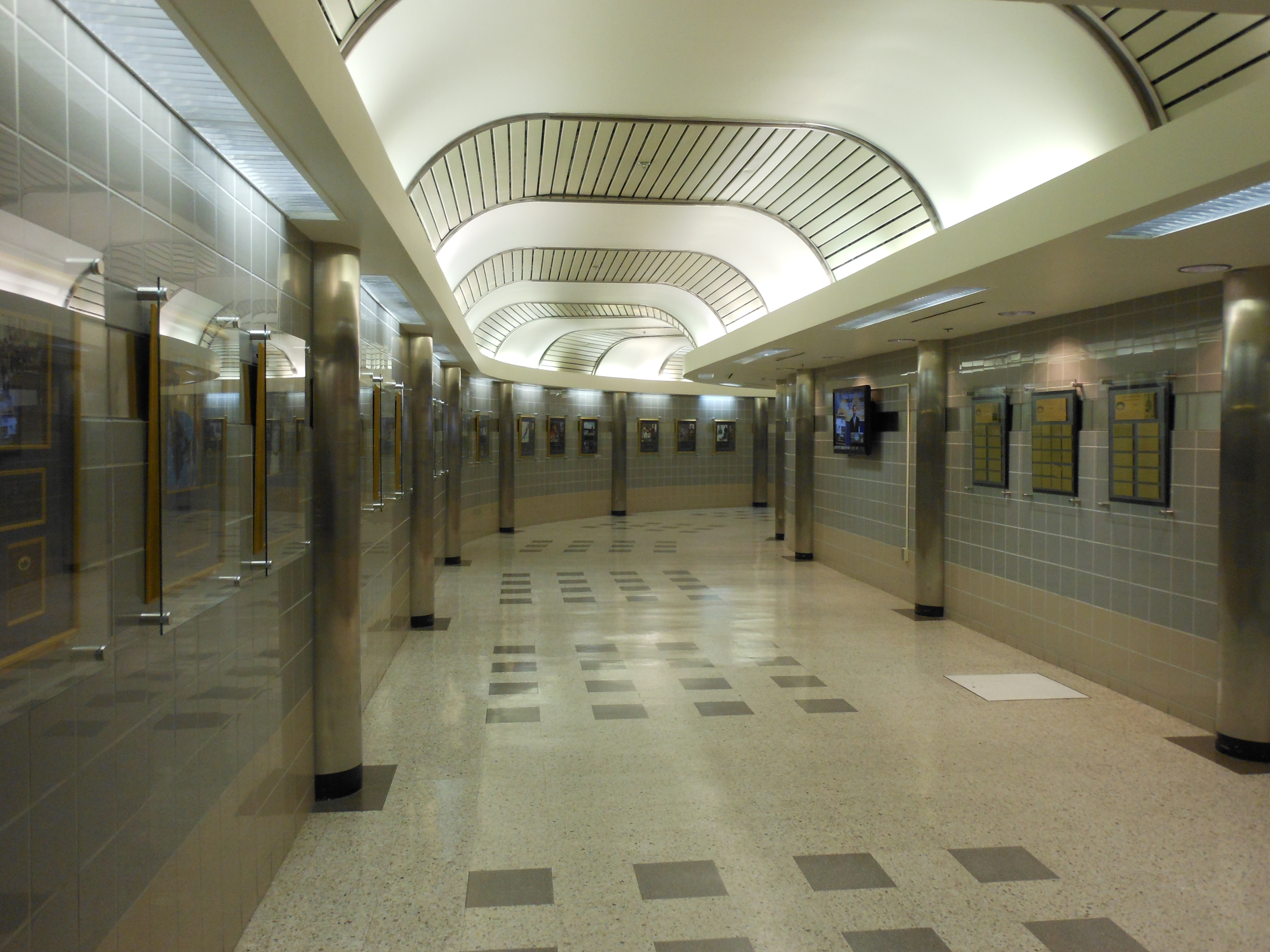
- Alaska Sports Hall of Fame display at Ted Stevens Anchorage International Airport in August 2012.
- Established: 2006
- Location: Anchorage, AK
- Coordinates: 61.174°N 149.996°W
- Type: Hall of fame
- Director: Harlow Robinson
- Public transit access: People Mover routes 40, 65
- Website: www.alaskasportshall.org/index.html

The Alaska Sports Hall of Fame honors Alaskan athletes, coaches, contributors, recurring events, and historic moments that have significantly impacted the sporting landscape of Alaska. The Hall was established in 2006 and the first class was inducted in 2007, with new inductees announced in December and added in February. The museum is currently on display at the Ted Stevens Anchorage International Airport.

== History ==
The Alaska Sports Hall of Fame honors Alaskan athletes, coaches, contributors, recurring events, and historic moments that have significantly impacted the sporting landscape of Alaska. It was established in 2006 and inducted its first class of five people, two moments, and one event in 2007, a group including dog mushers Susan Butcher and George Attla, Olympic medalists Tommy Moe and Kristen Thorsness, and National Hockey League Calder Memorial Trophy winner Scott Gomez.

New members, events, and moments are nominated and voted upon by the public each fall, with the results determining which nominees reach the selection panel ballot. The inductees are chosen by a voting panel of eight members of the media and longtime Alaskan sport contributors with the public voting results equivalent to one member of the panel. New inductees are announced in December. The inductees are honored with a ceremony each February in the ConocoPhillips Building atrium. The induction ceremony for the class of 2020 was postponed until April 2022 due to the COVID-19 pandemic.

Plaques for each inductee are displayed in a museum on level 0 of the Ted Stevens Anchorage International Airport.

== List of recipients ==
The members, events, and moments of the Alaska Sports Hall of Fame are listed below.

=== People ===
Hall of fame member	Sport	Birthplace	Alaska affiliation(s)	Induction year
George Attla	Dog Mushing	Koyukuk, Alaska	Huslia	2007
Chad Bentz	Baseball	Seward, Alaska	Juneau-Douglas High School	2019
Carlos Boozer	Basketball	Aschaffenburg, Germany	Juneau-Douglas High School	2008
H.A. “Red” Boucher	Baseball	Nashua, New Hampshire	Alaska Goldpanners of Fairbanks	2009
Holly Brooks	Cross-country skiing	Seattle, Washington	Alaska Pacific University	2018
John Brown	Basketball		Ketchikan High School	2015
Martin Buser	Dog Mushing	Winterthur, Switzerland	Big Lake	2017
Susan Butcher	Dog Mushing	Cambridge, Massachusetts	Iditarod Trail Sled Dog Race	2007
Matt Carle	Ice Hockey	Anchorage, Alaska	Anchorage	2020
Mario Chalmers	Basketball	Anchorage, Alaska	Bartlett High School	2014
Don Clary	Athletics	Anchorage, Alaska	East Anchorage High School	2016
Corey Cogdell	Trapshooting	Palmer, Alaska	Palmer	2019
Janay Deloach	Athletics	Panama City, Florida	Ben Eielson Junior/Senior High School	2016
Herb Didrickson	All-around	Sitka, Alaska	Sitka, Sheldon Jackson High School, Sheldon Jackson Junior College	2013
Brandon Dubinsky	Ice Hockey	Anchorage, Alaska	Service High School	2025
Rosey Fletcher	Snowboarding	Anchorage, Alaska	Anchorage	2010
Joe Floyd	Coach	Askew, Mississippi	Kodiak High School	2023
Scott Gomez	Ice Hockey	Anchorage, Alaska	East Anchorage High School	2007
Dick Griffith	Adventure racing	Colorado	Alaska Mountain Wilderness Classic	2026
Jeannie Hebert-Truax	Basketball	Glennallen, Alaska	Wasilla High School	2014
Bobby Hill	Powerlifting		Alaska Special Olympics	2024
Virgil Hooe	Volleyball		Anchorage	2018
Nicole Johnston	World Eskimo Indian Olympics		World Eskimo Indian Olympics	2017
Reggie Joule	World Eskimo Indian Olympics	Nome, Alaska	World Eskimo Indian Olympics	2010
Alev Kelter	Rugby	Tampa, Florida	Chugiak High School	2025
Nina Kemppel	Nordic Skiing	Boulder, Colorado	Alaska Pacific University Ski Team	2009
Jeff King	Dog Mushing	North Fork, California	Denali Park	2017
Trajan Langdon	Basketball	Palo Alto, California	East Anchorage High School	2008
Wally Leask	Basketball	Metlakatla, Alaska	Sheldon Jackson boarding school	2009
Butch Lincoln	Basketball	Kotzebue, Alaska	Kotzebue High School	2026
Hilary Lindh	Alpine Skiing	Juneau, Alaska	Eaglecrest Ski Area	2009
Lance Mackey	Dog Mushing	Anchorage, Alaska	Kasilof	2010
Dick Mize	Skiing	Gilman, Colorado	Anchorage	2015
Tommy Moe	Alpine Skiing	Missoula, Montana	Palmer, Girdwood	2007
Jessica Moore	Basketball	Fairbanks, Alaska	Colony High School	2023
Buck Nystrom	American football		Ben Eielson Junior/Senior High School, North Pole High School	2013
Allie Ostrander	Track & field	Kenai, Alaska	Kenai Central High School	2024
Nancy Pease	Mountain running		Crow Pass, Bird Ridge, Mount Marathon	2015
Kikkan Randall	Nordic Skiing	Salt Lake City, Utah	Anchorage	2011
Sean Rash	Bowling	Denver, Colorado	Dimond High School	2026
Joe Redington Sr.	Dog Mushing	Kingfisher, Oklahoma	Iditarod Trail Sled Dog Race	2008
Mark Schlereth	Football	Anchorage, Alaska	Service High School	2008
Dallas Seavey	Dog Mushing	Virginia	Iditarod Trail Sled Dog Race	2024
Bill Spencer	Skiing	Anchorage, Alaska	Service High School	2012
Rick Swenson	Dog Mushing	Willmar, Minnesota	Iditarod Trail Sled Dog Race	2008
Vern Tejas	Mountain Climber, Explorer	Portland, Oregon	Mount McKinley	2012
Kristen Thorsness	Rowing	Anchorage, Alaska	West Anchorage High School	2007
Reggie Tongue	Football	Baltimore, Maryland	Lathrop High School	2023
Marcie Trent	Running			2020
Norman Vaughan	Explorer	Salem, Massachusetts	Iditarod Trail Sled Dog Race	2009
Bradford Washburn	Mountain Climber, Explorer	Cambridge, Massachusetts	Mount McKinley	2010
Chuck White	Basketball	Seattle, Washington	East Anchorage High School, West Anchorage High School	2011

=== Events ===
Hall of fame event	Description	Induction year
Iditarod Trail Sled Dog Race	Annual dog mushing race covering 1,161 miles (1,868 km) from Willow, AK to Nome, AK.	2007
Great Alaska Shootout	Collegiate basketball tournament hosted annually by the University of Alaska Anchorage.	2008
World Eskimo Indian Olympics	Annual event featuring traditional Eskimo and Indian games based on ancestral hunting and survival techniques.	2009
Midnight Sun Baseball Classic	Annual baseball game played in Fairbanks, Alaska on the night of the summer solstice using no artificial lighting.	2010
Mount Marathon	Annual footrace in Seward, AK dating back to 1915.	2011
Yukon 800	Annual speedboat race from Fairbanks to Galena and back.	2020
State Basketball Tournament / March Madness Alaska	High school basketball tournament hosted annually over two consecutive weekends at the Alaska Airlines Center in Anchorage.	2023

=== Moments ===
Hall of fame moment	Description	Induction year
First Ascent of Mount McKinley	Walter Harper, Hudson Stuck, Harry Karstens and Robert Tatum became the first to reach the highest peak in North America on June 7, 1913.	2007
1985 Iditarod Victory by Libby Riddles	Riddles recorded the first victory by a woman in the Iditarod Trail Sled Dog Race.	2007
Tommy Moe's 1994 Olympic Gold Medal in the Downhill	Moe's surprise victory led to the cover of Sports Illustrated and guest appearance on the Late Show with David Letterman.	2008
First Winter Ascent of Mt. McKinley in 1967	Art Davidson, Ray Genet and Dave Johnston, over a 42-day period, reached the peak of Mt. McKinley in the winter of 1967.	2009
Doug Herron's Track Performance in 1985	Herron, an Anchorage high school student, shattered the Alaska State High School 800-meter run record with a 1985 national best time of 1 minute, 49.2 seconds.	2009
Iditarod Photo Finish in 1978	Dick Mackey defeated Rick Swenson by one second in a sprint finish at the end of the 1978 Iditarod Trail Sled Dog Race.	2010
Elliot Sampson's Upset Victory in 1981	Sampson, an Eskimo high school student from Noorvik, AK, claimed the 1981 Alaska State High School Cross Country Running championship.	2010
Scott Gomez Brings the Stanley Cup to Alaska	Ice hockey player Scott Gomez brought the Stanley Cup to Anchorage, AK in the Summer of 2000 after winning the National Hockey League championship with the New Jersey Devils.	2011
University of Alaska Anchorage Upset of Boston College in the 1991 NCAA Hockey Tournament	The University of Alaska Anchorage Ice Hockey team upset Boston College by winning the first round series 2-0 in the 1991 NCAA Division I Men's Ice Hockey Tournament.	2020
Kikkan Randall's Winter Olympic Games Gold in 2018	Kikkan Randall and Jessie Diggins became the first American cross-country skiers to win a gold medal by winning the women's team sprint at the 2018 Winter Olympics.	2023
Scott Gomez Named NHL Rookie of the Year in 2000	Scott Gomez won the Calder Memorial Trophy in 2000 after leading all rookies in scoring with 19 goals and 51 assists for 70 points.	2024
Mario Chalmers' Game-Saving 3-Pointer in the NCAA Title Game in 2008	No. 1 Kansas were trailing No. 1 Memphis 63–60 when Mario Chalmers made a 3-pointer with 2.1 seconds left in regulation to tie the game.	2025
Anchorage named America’s Choice to host 1992 Winter Olympics	The city of Anchorage bid for the 1992 Winter Olympics in 1986, but lost in the final host selection vote.	2025
16-year-old Ephriam Kalmakoff sets Mount Marathon record in 1928	Ephriam Kalmakoff broke the record of the Mount Marathon Race with a time of 52:35, which was 2.5 minutes better than the previous record.	2026
The East/Bartlett triple-overtime boys basketball state title game in 1993		2026

== See also ==
- List of halls and walks of fame
