= Birkland =

Birkland is a surname of English origin. The name refers to:

- Henry Birkland (1917–1944), was a Canadian World War II POW who took part in the 'Great Escape'.
- Stephen Birkland (born c. 1951 – c. 1952), a member of the Universal House of Justice, supreme governing body of Baháʼí Faith.
- Thomas A. Birkland (b.1961) is a political scientist specializing in the study of public policy.
