= Virgil Hooe =

American volleyball coach

Personal information
- Full name: Virgil Dean Hooe
- Born: 1947 or 1948

Coaching information
- Previous teams coached
- Years: Teams
- 1979–1981 1982–1984 1985–1989 1990–2003 2004–2015 2016: West Anchorage HS (asst.); West Anchorage HS; Service HS (asst.); Service HS; South Anchorage HS (asst.); Alaska Anchorage (volunteer asst.)
Medal record
Volleyball
Representing Alaska
Arctic Winter Games
Gold medal – first place	1986 Whitehorse	Open men's
Silver medal – second place	1984 Yellowknife	Open men's
Head coach for Alaska
Arctic Winter Games
Gold medal – first place	1984 Yellowknife	Junior women's

Virgil Dean Hooe (born 1947 or 1948) is an American volleyball coach who played a central role in the development of high school and club volleyball in Alaska.

A multi-sport athlete in his youth, Hooe played football, basketball, track, and baseball while growing up in Illinois. He was introduced to volleyball only after moving to Alaska during his U.S. Army service in the 1970s. Hooe went on to coach at the high school level in Anchorage for over three decades, guiding three different teams to 17 total ASAA state championships as a head coach and as an assistant, becoming known as the "godfather of Alaska volleyball". He also founded the state's premier club team, the Midnight Sun Volleyball Club, which is credited with spurring the growth of the sport throughout the state and developing most of Alaska's top talent.

Hooe was inducted into the Alaska High School Hall of Fame in 2014 and the Alaska Sports Hall of Fame in 2018, with the latter describing him as being "synonymous with volleyball in Alaska".

== Early life and education ==
Virgil Dean Hooe was born to Virgil and Mary E. Hooe. His father was the principal at Pesotum High School, where he coached the basketball and track teams in the early 1930s. The Urbana Daily Courier noted that he did "wonders... with his high school teams". He died of polio in 1950. His mother was also a teacher and operated a local beauty shop for many years, in addition to serving as a member of the local Veterans of Foreign Wars Auxiliary. She died in 2007.

Hooe attended Sullivan High School in Sullivan, Illinois, where he played quarterback in football, earned a letter in basketball, and was the "top miler" on the track team. He was a member of the Future Teachers of America and was awarded a teacher education scholarship, graduating from Sullivan in 1965. Hooe also played on the local American Legion Baseball team.

Hooe accepted a scholarship to attend nearby Eastern Illinois University, where he captained both the track and cross country teams. He competed at three straight NAIA Cross Country Championships from 1966 to 1968, and helped the Panthers to a runner-up finish at the 1968 NCAA College Division Cross Country Championships as the only senior on the team. They also won back-to-back Interstate Intercollegiate Athletic Conference (IIAC) titles in 1967 and 1968. In track, Hooe ran the three miles outdoors and the two miles indoors, notably forming part of the first indoor track team in school history in 1967. As a junior, he set the Lantz Field House two-mile record twice within the span of a week. Finally, in 1969, Hooe helped the Panthers win both the IIAC and NAIA indoor track titles.

After earning his B.S. in education from EIU, Hooe began teaching biology and physical science at his alma mater, Sullivan High School. He served as head coach for both the junior varsity (JV) basketball and the freshman football teams, as well as an assistant on both varsity squads. Hooe also played for his local softball team, the Sullivan Chiefs, helping them win the 1970 Amateur Softball Association Class B fast-pitch state title, and ran the 1970 Boston Marathon. The 1970 Sullivan Chiefs squad was later inducted into the Illinois Amateur Softball Association Hall of Fame in 2015.

== Military service and introduction to volleyball ==
In June 1971, Hooe was drafted into the U.S. Army during the Vietnam War. He graduated with top honors from the Army's Officer Candidate School at Fort Benning in January 1972. Shortly afterwards, Hooe was commissioned an Army Second Lieutenant. In 1974, he was transferred to Fort Richardson near Anchorage, Alaska. In 1976, Hooe assumed command of the headquarters for the 172nd Support Battalion of the 172nd Infantry Brigade at Fort Richardson. After a six-year stint in the Army, he worked as a representative for the Jack Parks division office of Mutual of Omaha.

In a 1991 interview with the Anchorage Daily News, Hooe said that he "was one of those people who thought [volleyball] was a sissy's game" prior to his involvement in the sport. He began playing military intramural matches in 1972 and quickly "fell in love with the game’s intricacies". Hooe attended coaches' clinics and played for "top-level" military teams. After moving to Alaska, he played in the Anchorage Sports Association leagues and landed on traveling all-star teams, competing in outside tournaments against players like Olympian Karch Kiraly and actor Tom Selleck. Hooe's playing career was hampered by chronic tendinitis, though he continued playing on city league teams well into his coaching career.

== Coaching career ==
=== West Anchorage (1979–1984) ===
Hooe turned to coaching volleyball and, in 1979, he was hired at West Anchorage High School as varsity assistant coach and JV head coach. He conducted clinics, officiated collegiate games, coached the women's state representative team, and served as the United States Volleyball Association Commissioner for Alaska. At West Anchorage, Hooe eventually assumed co-head coaching responsibilities alongside coach Ellie Dudley, and the pair "began to bring Anchorage high school volleyball out of its Dark Ages". He took over the reins of the program completely in 1982 upon Dudley's retirement. In 1983, Hooe led West Anchorage to a state runner-up finish after compiling an unimpressive 9–6 record in league play. In 1984, the Eagles went 20–1 (14–1 in league play) and captured the state title under his leadership. It was the school's second state volleyball title in the tournament's 10-year history. However, Hooe resigned after the season because he felt the team was under-appreciated at the school.

=== Arctic Winter Games and representative coaching (1984–1986) ===
Hooe was selected to represent the Alaskan contingent at the 1984 Arctic Winter Games in Yellowknife as both a player and a junior-level coach. He guided the junior women's team to an undefeated, gold ulu-winning performance, while his open men's team took silver.

Hooe played again at the 1986 Arctic Winter Games in Whitehorse, where the Alaskan men defeated the Northwest Territories in the gold-ulu match.

=== Service High School (1985–2003) ===
When the door closes at 2:35 (for practice), all pretenses of friendship are dropped. And that's the one thing I really dislike about myself. I've seen some really good kids come through here that I miss and never had the chance to be friends with. But I would rather have them say, when that last ball drops on the floor, that I did everything I could to help them reach their goals.

— Virgil Hooe, March 1992, interview with the Anchorage Times

Two months after stepping down from the West Anchorage job, Hooe was contacted by coach Susie Holway to join her staff at Service High School. The duo led Service to a 132–7 record over five seasons, including two undefeated state championship-winning seasons in 1986 and 1989. Hooe served as an assistant under Holway – though she consistently referred to him as a co-coach – until her resignation following their 1989 state title win. He was officially named the team's new head coach ahead of the 1990 season.

In his first three seasons as head coach from 1990 to 1992, Hooe led the Service Cougars to three straight state championship crowns, including a perfect 28–0 season in 1991. Service's 38-match winning streak was snapped during the 1992 regular season by the Tacoma 18's junior team, a top club team from Washington, which Hooe counted on his team's record despite not having to. "A loss is a loss, period," he explained. Amid an increase in the level and parity of play in the region, Service missed every state tournament from 1993 to 1996, save a state quarterfinals exit in 1995.

Ahead of the 1997–98 school year, the Alaska School Activities Association moved the volleyball season from winter to fall to align with the rest of the country, thus allowing Alaskan high school teams to travel outside the state for tournaments. In their first outside tournament, Hooe guided the Cougars to a second-place finish at the 1997 Pacific Northwest Challenge in Seattle. "[Tournament officials] had thought Alaska volleyball was very much behind the rest of the country," he said. "It took them one round to say, 'We didn't bring in enough big guns for you.'" That season, Hooe led Service to a 23–4 record and their first state championship title since 1993. He was named the inaugural Anchorage Daily News/Coaches Coach of the Year for volleyball. In 1998, Hooe again led the Cougars to the state championship game, where they were upset by first-time champions Colony High School. In 1999, Service tied for fifth place at the Adidas High School Volleyball Challenge in Portland, Oregon, going unbeaten in pool play before losing to the defending Oregon state champions, West Linn High School, in the final round. That would be their only loss on the season, as Hooe guided the Cougars to a 25–1 record and the state championship title. Notably, three seniors on the squad, including Alaska Gatorade Player of the Year Kasey Kuelper, chose to stay home and play college volleyball at Alaska Anchorage.

I'm embarrassed, but I accept all this because of all the people I have worked with. People should be so lucky to go to work like I do every day. Through Midnight Sun and coaching [at Service], I have had the best of both worlds.

— Virgil Hooe shortly after confirming his retirement in November 2003

In 2000, despite returning just two varsity players, Hooe led Service to a 24–3 record and their third state championship title in four years. However, in 2001, the Cougars were eliminated in the first round of the state tournament by Skyview High School, marking the first time they failed to reach the semifinals in 15 tournament appearances. They suffered the same fate in 2002, as they were swept by Palmer High School in the opening round of the state tournament. In 2003, after leading the Cougars to the region tournament title, Hooe was honored in a post-match ceremony before confirming that he was stepping down as head coach at the conclusion of the state tournament. Service finished the season with a 25–2 record and clinched the triple crown – the region regular-season title, region tournament title, and state championship title. After beating Bartlett High School in the state championship match, Hooe was presented with the game ball, which he immediately handed to the team's seniors.

During his tenure, Hooe guided the Service Cougars to 17 region regular-season titles, 14 region tournament titles, nine state championship titles, and over 400 match wins. He notably never played a freshman on the Service varsity team.

=== South Anchorage (2004–2015) ===
In 2004, Hooe helped head coach Judy Knecht launch the volleyball program at the newly-opened South Anchorage High School. Several of his Service players followed him. Hooe helped the South Anchorage Wolverines win their first state championship title in just their second season in 2005. His daughter, Morgan, became the team's starting setter in their 5–1 formation as a freshman. Hooe served as an assistant under Knecht until her retirement in 2015. He helped the team win a total of six state crowns, including the 2011 title with Morgan.

=== Alaska Anchorage (2016) ===
After stepping down from his role at South Anchorage, Hooe joined the University of Alaska Anchorage volleyball program in 2016 as a volunteer assistant coach. He was encouraged to do so by his daughter Morgan, who was by then in her senior season with the Seawolves. Hooe was able to focus on teaching instead of the responsibilities of a head coach or top assistant. "I really enjoyed this year because I get to talk with kids. I get to be personable with them and I can talk about the game," he said. "The other end of the bench, that's high velocity. And I don't have to do that anymore." In his lone season with the Seawolves, he helped the team to a national runner-up finish.

=== Midnight Sun ===
Hooe co-founded the Midnight Sun Volleyball Club, along with Dan Knecht, to continue training local players beyond the two-month high school season. "We just wanted to make high school volleyball better, middle school volleyball better, because it was a sorry array when we started this thing," he later said.

The club's year-round schedule and exposure to outside competition for players from a young age was credited with raising the level of play in local high schools. The club also held classes to help players navigate their college recruitment process. Hooe conducted clinics for both players and coaches, and former players began returning as coaches to further strengthen the local volleyball ecosystem. He also conducted clinics for students in places outside of Anchorage, such as the Kenai Peninsula, to promote and grow the game in more remote parts of Alaska. The Midnight Sun later opened branches in the Kenai Peninsula, the Mat-Su Valley, and Juneau.

Hooe later said that they initially had to "beg kids to come out". The club fielded just 10 players in 1980. By 1986, the Midnight Sun had multiple former players playing NCAA Division I volleyball. One of them, Diana Jessie, became the first Alaskan to play on an NCAA champion with the 1987 Hawaii team while another, Leisa Wissler, was Alaska's first high school All-American. By 1988, the club had over a dozen alumni that had played Division I. By 1995, the club had produced over 130 college volleyball players.

Hooe made annual trips with the club to the prestigious Volleyball Festival held at UC Davis in Davis, California, beginning with the inaugural edition in 1984. At the 1988 event, he was honored with a distinguished service award for his contributions to Alaskan volleyball. The Midnight Sun under-18 girls' team won the 1988 USVBA Junior Olympics consolation bracket in Fort Collins, Colorado. By then, the club comprised 11 teams, including 10 girls' teams. In 1990, the Midnight Sun elite under-18 girls' team won their division at the 10th annual Southern California Holiday Tournament in Los Angeles, which was the best finish by an Alaska junior volleyball team in a national competition. In 2013, the Midnight Sun under-18 team went 10–1 and won their division at the 30th annual Volleyball Festival in Phoenix, Arizona, marking their best finish at the prestigious competition. The team, which included Hooe's daughter, Morgan, was seeded 28th out of 45 squads and beat a team from Santa Clarita, California, in the championship final. By then, the Midnight Sun comprised 24 teams.

In 1988, Hooe helped bring a Major League Volleyball match between the Chicago Breeze and the Minnesota Monarchs to Anchorage, with the two teams facing off in a regular-season match at the West Anchorage High School gymnasium on March 26 in front of about 1,300 spectators.

== Personal life ==
Hooe married his first wife, Candice Kranz, in 1971. Their daughter was born in 1974. After moving to Alaska, Hooe was remarried to Celeste Anne Faris in 1976. They divorced in 1979. In 1988, Hooe married Elizabeth "Liz" Hansen, a former multi-sport star at Dimond High School whom he met while playing volleyball. She died of ovarian cancer in 2012. They had two children, including Morgan Hooe, who was an All-American volleyball player at Alaska Anchorage before transitioning to coaching.
