= Chuck White (coach) =

American basketball coach

Charles Willard White (July 21, 1941 – November 25, 2019) was an American basketball coach.

== Career ==
White was born in Seattle on July 21, 1941. He moved to Alaska in 1965, leaving the University of Idaho.

During his career, White coached the Anchorage high school basketball teams and led them successfully in 18 state championships, fourteen times at East Anchorage High School and four times at West Anchorage High School.

White spent the most of his career transforming the East Thunderbirds into the most successful club in Alaska.

In 2011, he was inducted into Alaska Sports Hall of Fame. He was also included in Alaska High School Hall of Fame. By the win percentage, he is included in top-10 all time basketball coaches.

White died in 2019 at the age of 78.

== Awards ==
- Alaska Sports Hall of Fame
