= George Attla =

Native American dog musher (1933–2015)

- Attla in 1976
- Born: August 8, 1933; Koyukuk, Alaska, United States
- Died: February 15, 2015 (aged 81); Alaska Native Medical Center, Anchorage, Alaska, United States
- Other name: Huslia Hustler
- Known for: Sprint Dog Mushing
- Children: 9
- Website: http://attlamakingofachampion.com/

George Attla Jr (August 8, 1933 – February 15, 2015) was a Native American champion sprint dog musher. Attla won ten Fur Rendezvous Championships and eight Open North American Championships as well as numerous other races with a career that spanned from 1958 to 2011.

== Early life ==
George Attla was born on August 8, 1933, at a fish camp near Koyukuk, then part of Alaska Territory to Alaskan Athabaskan fur trapper George Attla Sr and Eliza Attla. Raised speaking only Koyukon and following a traditional subsistence lifestyle, Attla spent much of his early life at seasonal hunting and fishing camps in the vicinity of the town of Huslia, Alaska. By age 7, Attla was accompanying his father on dog sled trips up to 50 miles (80 km) to check the winter trap linesin temperatures as low as −60 °F (−51 °C). At the age of eight or nine. he contracted tuberculosis, which led to almost ten years of hospitalizations, first in Tanana, Alaska and later in Sitka, Alaska. The disease affected his right knee, resulting in a fused joint that left him with a permanent limp. Hospitalized for years at a time, Attla attended school at the hospital where he learned to speak and read English. During the periods where he was able to return home, he found he was often unable to keep up with the physical demands required in a subsistence household and Attla began training puppies for dog sledding as a way to contribute to the household as well as depending on the sled dogs he trained to overcome the handicap of his leg.

== Mushing career ==
Attla's racing career began in 1958 when he entered the Fur Rendezvous World Championship in Anchorage as an unknown competitor with dogs borrowed from other mushers. Despite his disability and lack of experience, he won the championship. Over the next five decades, Attla secured ten Fur Rendezvous World Championship titles and eight Open North American Championship titles. His rivalry with Roland "Doc" Lombard, a veterinarian from Wayland, Massachusetts,captivated fans and elevated the sport's profile in Alaska. In 1973, Attla entered the inaugural Iditarod Trail Sled Dog Race, placing fourth.

Attla, known as "the Huslia Hustler," took his nickname from one of his mentors, Jimmy Huntington, who first began winning races during Attla's childhood. In recent generations, this nickname has become associated with Attla far more than with Huntington.

In 2007, he was inducted as a charter member of the Alaska Sports Hall of Fame.

== Training philosophy ==
Attla was renowned for his deep understanding of dog behavior and training. In 1972, he co-authored the book titled Everything I Know About Training and Racing Sled Dogs, a book that emphasizes the importance of proper training and the symbiotic relationship between musher and dog.

Attla was dedicated to preserving and promoting the cultural heritage of dog mushing. He founded the Frank Attla Youth & Sled Dog Program in Huslia to introduce young people to the sport and its traditions, named after his son Frank who died at 21.

== Personal life ==
Attla married Shirley Oldman from Hughes, Alaska in 1955. They divorced 16 years later. Attla married his second wife Karen in the 1970s and divorced in 1982. He married Tamara Ostlund in the late 1980s. Attla had a total of 9 children. In the 1950s, Attla developed worsening vision in his right eye due to glaucoma and by the 1970s, he was blind in that eye. Attla died of B-cell lymphoma on February 15, 2015, at Alaska Native Medical Center in Anchorage.

== Major mushing victories and finishes ==
- Anchorage Fur Rendezvous first place finishes: 1958, 1962, 1968, 1972, 1975, 1976, 1978, 1979, 1981, and 1982.
- Iditarod Trail Sled Dog Race: in 1973 Attla placed fourth in the inaugural Iditarod.
- International Sled Dog Racing Association unlimited class medals: nine times
- Open North American Championship: 8 first place finishes including 1969, 1970, 1972, 1975, 1978, 1979, 1986, 1987
- Tok Race of Champions: first place finish in 1958, 1969, 1970, 1972, 1974, 1977, 1979, 1985, 1988.
- Koyukuk River Sled Dog Championship: first place finish in 1982, 1986, 1988, 1991, 1992, 1994, 1995.

== Legacy ==
- Attla was the subject of a 1993 book titled George Attla: The Legend of the Sled-dog Trail, by Lewis "Lew" Freedman.
- On April 25, 1998, Alaskan governor Steve Cowper declared April 29 as George Attla Day in 1998 in recognition of his impact.
- Attla served as the central figure in the 1979 film Spirit of the Wind, which depicted his early life and rise to prominence in the world of dog mushing.
- Atta inspired the 2017 single "You Got to Run (Spirit of the Wind)", a collaboration between Buffy Sainte-Marie and Tanya Tagaq.
- The 2019 PBS documentary Attla chronicles the life and legacy of Attla as he trains his grandnephew to race his dogs one last time.
