= Mount Marathon Race =

Annual mountain race in Alaska

Coordinates: 60°6′40″N 149°28′34″W

The Mount Marathon Race is a mountain race that is run every Fourth of July in Seward, Alaska.

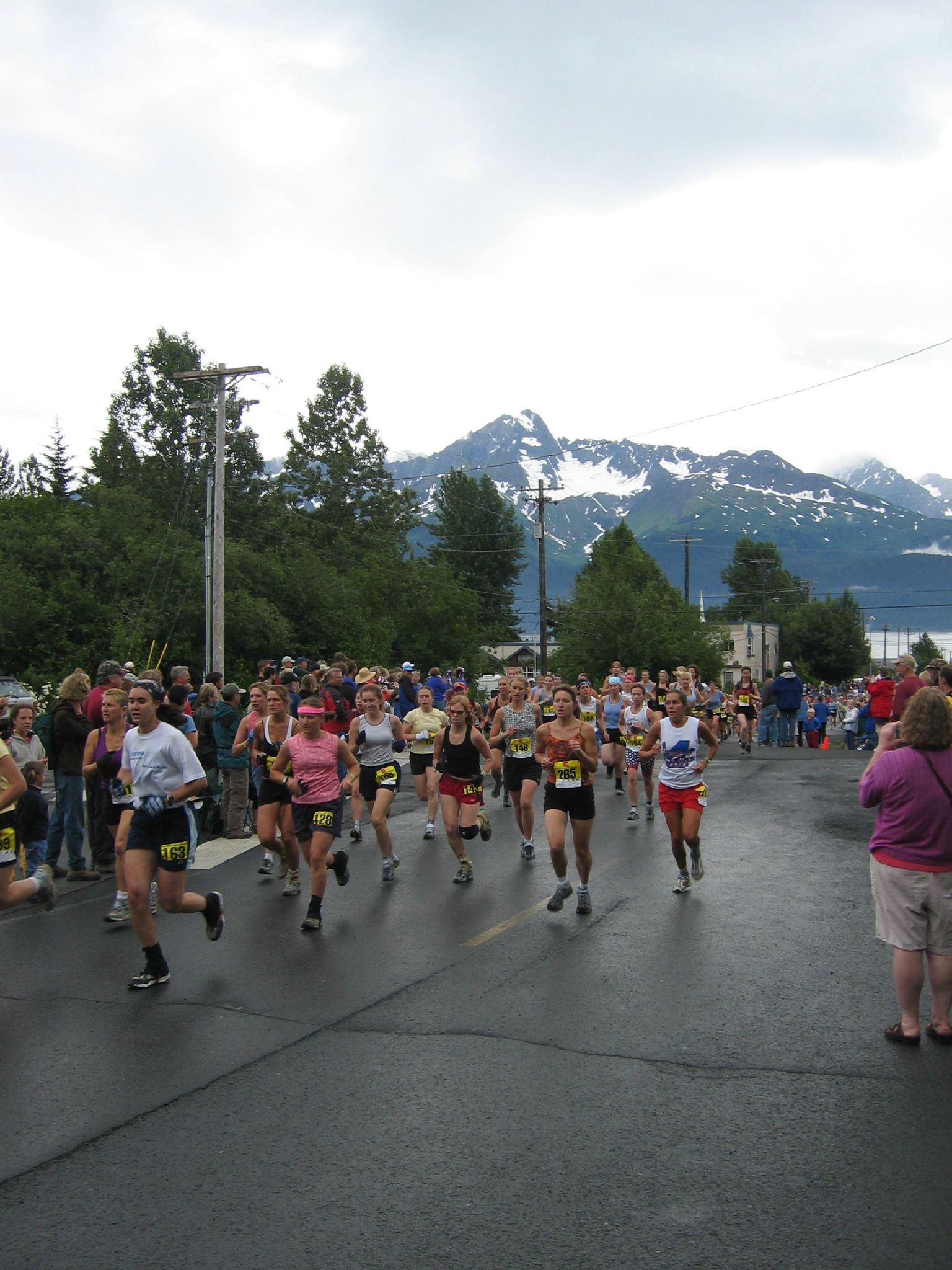
Runners shortly after the start of the race

== Course ==
The race begins downtown, at Fourth and Adams, in front of the First National Bank Alaska, and ends a block south of where it began, at Fourth and Washington. The juniors' race starts at 9am, while the start times for the men's and women's races alternate each year.

The halfway point is a stone marker on Mount Marathon, 2,974 feet (906 m) above sea level, and a mile and a half from the finish line. The total race course distance is about 3.1 miles (5 kilometers). Leading racers will typically reach the highest point from the starting line in 33–40 minutes, and reach the finish line from the turn in 10–15 minutes. Average speed uphill is 2 mph. Average speed downhill is 12 mph. It is not uncommon for the racers who finish to cross the finish line injured or bleeding and covered in mud.

== Entries ==
In order to limit the environmental impact of the race, the entrants were limited to 350 men, 350 women, and 200 juniors until 2012, when the field was expanded to permit 400 entrants for the men's and women's races. In 2013, however, the number of entries was again lowered to 350 each for the men's and women's races. In 2017, the number of entries in the juniors race was increased to 300, with 150 slots available for boys and 150 for girls.

The slots are filled in the following order:

- Veteran racers who have completed the prerequisite number of races
- Prior year registered runners who have not completed the prerequisite number of races but have a waiver
- Current year special invitation

The remaining slots are filled by a weighted lottery. Instituted after the 2013 race, this systems gives racers who have applied before additional entries in the lottery and improving their chances of being selected. In 2019, the race offered a waitlist for the first time.

Previous winners of any prior year are allowed to enter until the morning of the race.

Lottery application fees for the 2019 race were $20 for adults and $15 for juniors; successful applicants pay an additional registration fee of $85 for adults and $25 for juniors.

== History ==
The Mount Marathon Race is one of a number of races believed to be among the oldest foot races in America. Various claims say it was first run in 1908, 1909, or 1912—but there is no evidence to support any date before the first organized run in 1915. The challenge was to run from downtown, to the top of the mountain and back, in under an hour. Legend says that it all started out as a bar bet between two "sourdoughs" (slang for people who have stayed in the North for many winters), with one betting a man could race to the top of the mountain and back in less than an hour, and the other saying that wasn't possible. The winning racer finished in one hour and twenty minutes. Since Seward is a port town, every arriving ship had its challenger who wanted to beat the one hour bet. This may have been how the race evolved.

For the first official race, in 1915, local merchants donated prizes and suggested the race take place on the 4th of July. There was no official route—racers were free to choose their own trails to the summit and back. The winning runner, James Walters, finished in one hour, two minutes.

The event was honored in February 2011 with an official induction into the Alaska Sports Hall of Fame.

During the 2012 race, an Anchorage man, 65-year-old Michael LeMaitre, disappeared after last being seen by race officials approaching the summit. He was officially declared dead in August 2012, and his family reached a settlement with the Seward Chamber of Commerce in 2014. It was the first presumed fatality in the history of the race, which normally produces numerous injuries. In response to LeMaitre's disappearance and unusually severe injuries suffered by two other racers in 2012, several safety improvements were made prior to the 2013 race.

In 2019, the juniors race was cancelled due to air quality concerns related to the Swan Lake Fire, which started in the Kenai National Wildlife Refuge on June 5; all racers were given the option to defer entry to 2020.

The 2020 edition of the race was cancelled (Note: It was first postponed on 2020.04.14 before being cancelled on 2020.05.31.) due to the coronavirus pandemic, with all entries being transferred to 2021. It also was cancelled in 1917–18 & 1942–45.

== Films ==
- 3022 ft.: We All Have A Mountain To Climb. A documentary by filmmakers Natalie Fedak and Max Romey depict the 2014 edition of this centenarian race and the personal stories of the athletes who compete in it.

== Trivia ==
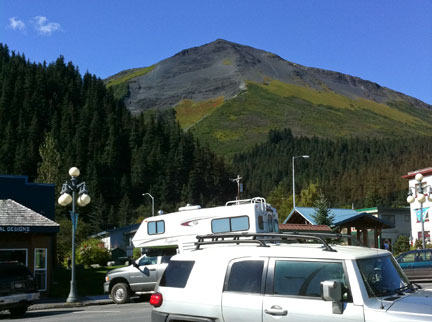
View of the mountain from Seward

- The men's race record time of 40:37 was set in 2024 by David Norris, beating the previous record set by himself in 2016 by 49 seconds.
- The first female finisher of the race was Erma Jane Trigg age 18 in 1:37:08. She was a resident of the Jesse Lee Home for Children in Seward.
- The women's record was set by Allie McLaughlin in 2022 with a time of 47:09, breaking the record set by Emelie Forsberg in 2015 (47:48).
- 54 women finished the first-ever women's race in 1985.
- The oldest finisher is Chad Resari, who ran the race in 2021 at the age of 85 in a time of 2:29:23.
- The Junior Race, for runners 17 years and younger, run the main street and up to the halfway point on the mountain and back down. Once the runner turns 18, they must compete in either the men's race or the women's race. In 2014 Allie Ostrander won the Junior race outright (boys and girls). Ostrander holds the girls' records for all age groups.
- Every year, a safety meeting is held at the Seward High School gymnasium where there is a video to watch, and those who have not entered the race can bid on a spot. Some of the bids go up to $3,000.
