= Underdog (2021 film) =

2021 documentary film

Underdog is a 2021 documentary film about a Vermont dairy farmer's quest to race his dogsled team at the Open North American Championships in Fairbanks, Alaska.
