= Yukon 800 Marathon =

The Yukon 800 Marathon, also known as the Yukon 800 Mile Marathon or simply the Yukon 800, is an annual speedboat race held in June. The race is run from Fairbanks, Alaska to Galena, Alaska and back, on the Chena, Tanana, and Yukon rivers.

The idea for the race was generated in 1959 and was originally run from Circle, Alaska to Fairbanks, via Fort Yukon. The first race was run in 1960 and was called the Arctic Circle Marathon. (The current route no longer crosses the Arctic Circle.) Ray Kasola was the winner of the inaugural race. In 1964, the race course was changed from Fairbanks to Ruby and back, and in 1972 was extended to Galena.

Competitors build their own 24-foot boats, which are required to have standard 50hp engines. The race can be dangerous and hard on the boats; in 2014, for instance, only two competitors finished the race. One of the two 2014 finishers, first-place Tom Kriska, has gone on to become a five-time winner. Harold Attla is the winningest competitor, having finished first 10 times between 1992 and 2011.

The event was inducted into the Alaska Sports Hall of Fame in 2020.
