= Dick Mize =

American biathlete (born 1935)

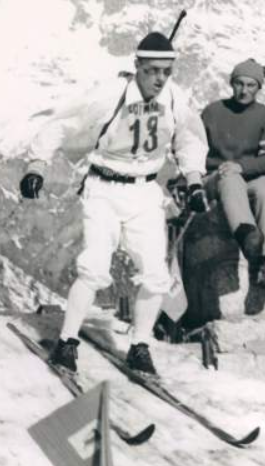
- Mize in 1959

Personal information
- Full name: Richard Norman Mize
- Born: December 17, 1935 (age 90) Gilman, Colorado, United States
- Military career
- Allegiance: United States
- Branch: US Army
- Service years: 1957–c. 1961
- Rank: Specialist

Sport
- Sport: Biathlon
Medal record
Men's Cross-country skiing
Representing the Western Colorado Mountaineers
NCAA Skiing Championships
Gold medal – first place	1956 Winter Park	Team Nordic
Gold medal – first place	1957 Mount Ogden	Team Nordic
Silver medal – second place	1956 Winter Park	Cross-country
Bronze medal – third place	1957 Mount Ogden	Cross-country

Richard Norman Mize (born December 17, 1935) is an American biathlete and cross-country skier. Born in Eagle County, he is credited as being the county's first Olympian after he competed at the 1960 Winter Olympics and placed 21st. During his college years, he earned multiple medals as part of the Western Colorado Mountaineers when they won two titles on 1956 and 1957 in cross-country skiing. He had learned the biathlon when he enlisted in the army, competing for the United States' national biathlon team in multiple competitions such as the 1959 North American Championships and two Biathlon World Championships.

After he was discharged from the army, he moved to Anchorage to become a teacher and a coach in cross-country skiing and running. There, he held administrative positions in the school and the district. Over a forty-year period, he designed multiple cross-country skiing trails in Anchorage. He was inducted to the Alaska Sports Hall of Fame in 2011 and remained active in sport, winning six Masters World Championship titles.

== Early life, education, and NCAA ==
Richard Norman "Dick" Mize was born on December 17, 1935, in Gilman, Eagle County, Colorado, to Harry and Pearl Mize. Richard's parents worked for the New Jersey Zinc Company at the time. He grew up in Red Cliff and frequently skied with family and friends on a track near his home in Turkey Creek and Tennessee Pass. The family had to move to Gilman during Mize's junior year of high school. He studied at Red Cliff Union High School, where he played for the school's basketball team and practiced the saxophone. He graduated from high school in 1953.

For his college education, he studied at Western State College and was part of the marching band. During a rehearsal on the school's football field, he approached coach Sven Wiik and asked to join the soccer team. Wiik had explained that it was the school's cross-country skiing team, though he invited Mize to train with the team. He made his NCAA skiing championships debut with the team in 1954. The team had won the 1956 and 1957 editions of the Nordic races. Individually, Mize placed fourth, second, and third, at the NCAA championships from 1955 to 1957.

== Career ==
After graduating, Mize had enlisted for the United States Army and was stationed at Fort Richardson. There he learned the biathlon and joined the Army's team. He was selected to compete at the first biathlon world championships in 1958, which were held at Saalfelden, Austria. In a competition in Italy after the World Championships, he had placed 30th as part of the Army's team. He then participated at the 1959 North American Championships, which was also a test event for the upcoming Winter Olympics in Squaw Valley. He placed second with a time of 1:54:21.9. He competed in his second world championships at Courmayeur, Italy in 1959.

Mize was selected to be part of the United States' team at the 1960 Summer Olympics in Squaw Valley after the trials at Tennessee Pass. The biathlon team trained at Camp Hale, with Mize stating: "It was just like being home." He competed on February 21 in the men's 20 kilometer individual biathlon and placed 21st with a time of 1:55:56.2. He is credited as being Eagle County's first Olympian. He also competed at the 1961 National Championships and placed fourth with a time of 1:10:33.

== Later years ==
He held the rank of specialist in the army. After he was discharged from the military, he moved to Anchorage and taught physical education and biology at East Anchorage High School. He also coached skiing and cross-country running, eventually becoming the principal and later an administrator for the Anchorage School District. He had also designed multiple cross-country skiing trails over a forty-year period, some hosting national events such as the 1969 Junior National Championships in Anchorage. Due to his contributions in the sport, he was inducted to the Alaska Sports Hall of Fame in 2011. He remained active as a skier, becoming a six-time Masters World Champion in the sport. Mize married Ann MacInnis Mize (née MacInnis) on July 1, 2000. In 2023, Mize was diagnosed with atrial flutter but recovered after a procedure.
