= Packraft =

Portable watercraft

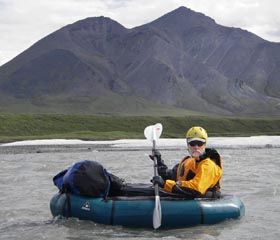
A packraft paddled with a kayak paddle

A packraft or trail boat is a small, portable inflatable boat designed for use in all bodies of water, including technical whitewater and ocean bays and fjords. A packraft is designed to be light enough to be carried for extended distances. Along with its propulsion system (collapsible paddles or lightweight oars) and safety equipment (personal flotation device, clothing), the entire package is designed to be light and compact enough for an individual to negotiate rough terrain while carrying the rafting equipment together with supplies, shelter, and other survival or backcountry equipment.

Modern packrafts vary from inexpensive vinyl boats lacking durability to sturdy craft costing over US$1,000. Most weigh less than 4 kg (9 lb) and usually carry a single passenger.

The most popular propulsion systems involve a kayak paddle that breaks down into two to five pieces. Most often they are paddled from a sitting position, although kneeling can be advantageous in some situations.

== History ==
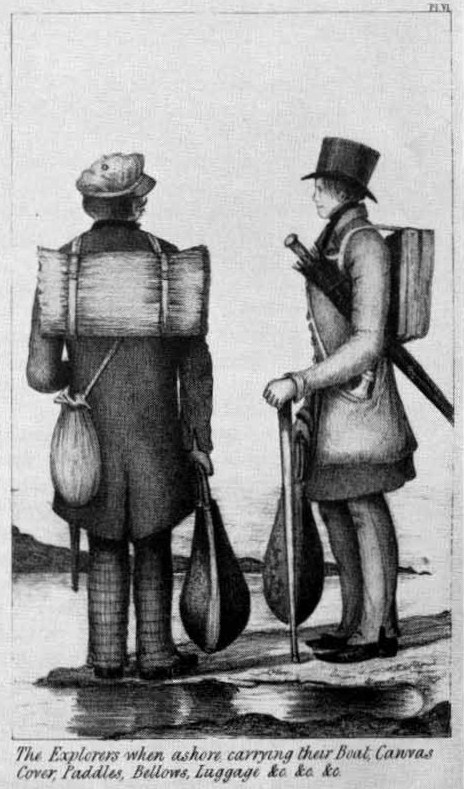
Halkett boat, an early type of packraft

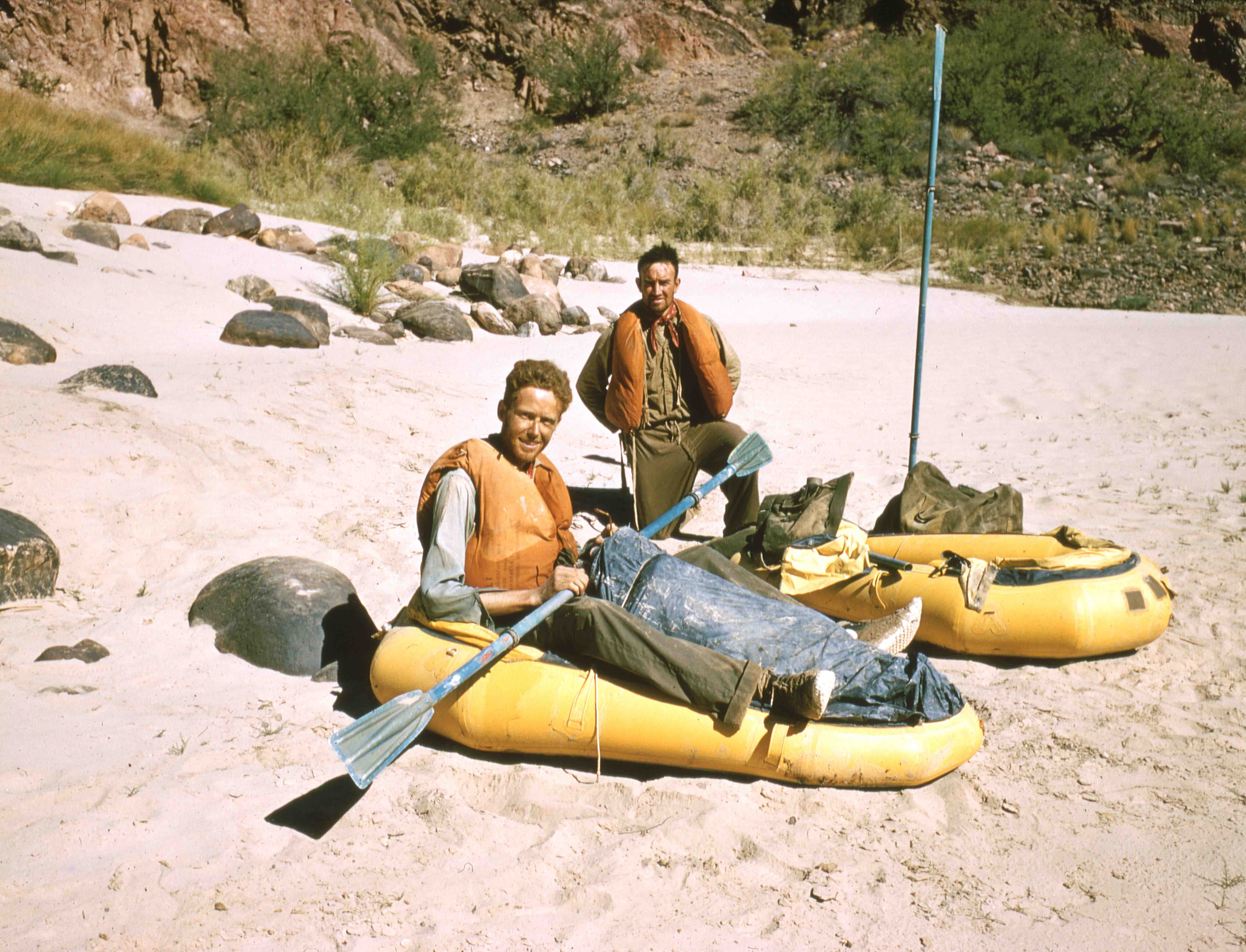
Neal Newby and Frank Moltzen at Bright Angel Beach, Grand Canyon National Park, September 1, 1956

Pioneering use of packrafts is difficult to trace, as float tubes, inner tubes, and other small boats can, in some of their uses, be considered equivalent to packrafts, and have been used around the world for over a century, beginning with the Halkett boat. However, Dick Griffith is documented to have used a packraft to descend Copper Canyon's Urique River (Chihuahua, Mexico) in 1952 before introducing them to the Alaska Mountain Wilderness Classic adventure race in 1982. Packrafts are now common equipment in that race. Neal Newby and Frank Moltzen paddled two packrafts down the Colorado River in Grand Canyon from the confluence of the Paria River to the confluence of Bright Angel Creek in 1956.

Several companies have made durable packrafts in the past including Sherpa, Curtis, and American Safety. Furthermore, aviator emergency rafts have been used for packrafting purposes in a variety of applications. Pioneering use of packrafts also consisted of using boats intended as pool toys or lake craft in moving water while carrying gear or passengers. The discomfort of these non-durable boats led to the invention and marketing of the modern packraft.

== Contemporary use ==
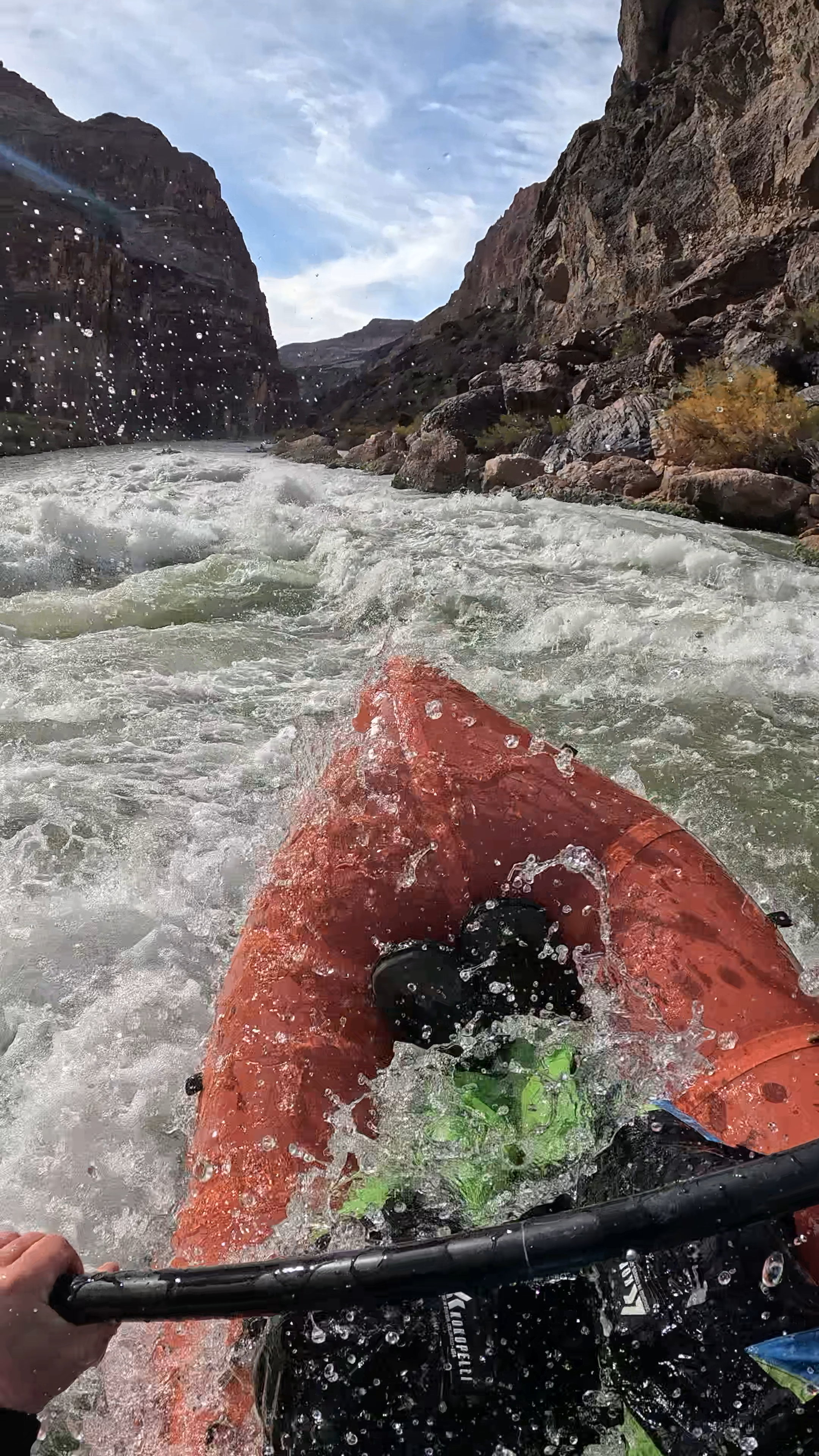
Packrafting the Grand Canyon in the Kokopelli Rodeo Self Bailing PVC packraft

Alaska is generally considered the birthplace of packrafting as long distance, non-motorized, landscape travel across untracked wilderness necessitates a small, portable boat for water crossings. Dick Griffith, Roman Dial (author of Packrafting! An Introduction and How-to Guide), the Alaska Mountain Wilderness Classic, Sheri Tingey (founder of Alpacka Rafts), and Erin McKittrick (author of A Long Trek Home: 4,000 Miles by Boot, Raft and Ski), and her husband Bretwood Higman all are, or have been, based in Alaska. In the U.S. outside Alaska, Forrest McCarthy, Nathan Shoutis, and Ryan Jordan have advanced backcountry packrafting in Wyoming, Montana, Washington, Utah, and Arizona. Packrafting has become popular in Nordic countries and elsewhere in Europe. Packrafts have also been used in Mexico, Southeast Asia, Australia (including its Franklin River), New Zealand, Patagonia, and tropical South America. Typically the boats are carried to cross and float rivers, streams and lakes while carried between watersheds.

Packrafts have historically been used as portable boats for long distance wilderness travel, usage that reached its apogee in the Higman-McKittrick 7,200 km (4,500 mile) expedition along the Pacific Coast from Seattle to the Aleutian Islands. This classical use has been modified by most packraft owners to shorter day trips that mix trail hiking and river and creek floats or lake paddles. In Europe packrafts are used together with train travel. Most of these hike and paddle applications are in gentler water of Class II or less. However, low-flow steep creeks rated to Class V and other whitewater runs that were previously considered suitable only for kayaks and bigger rafts, are now run frequently by packrafters. The addition of spray decks and thigh straps allow more precise control of the craft. Eskimo rolling in packrafts is now done routinely. Packrafts are increasingly popular among fishers and hunters as well as travelers who wish to carry a lightweight craft on airplanes.

== Characteristics ==
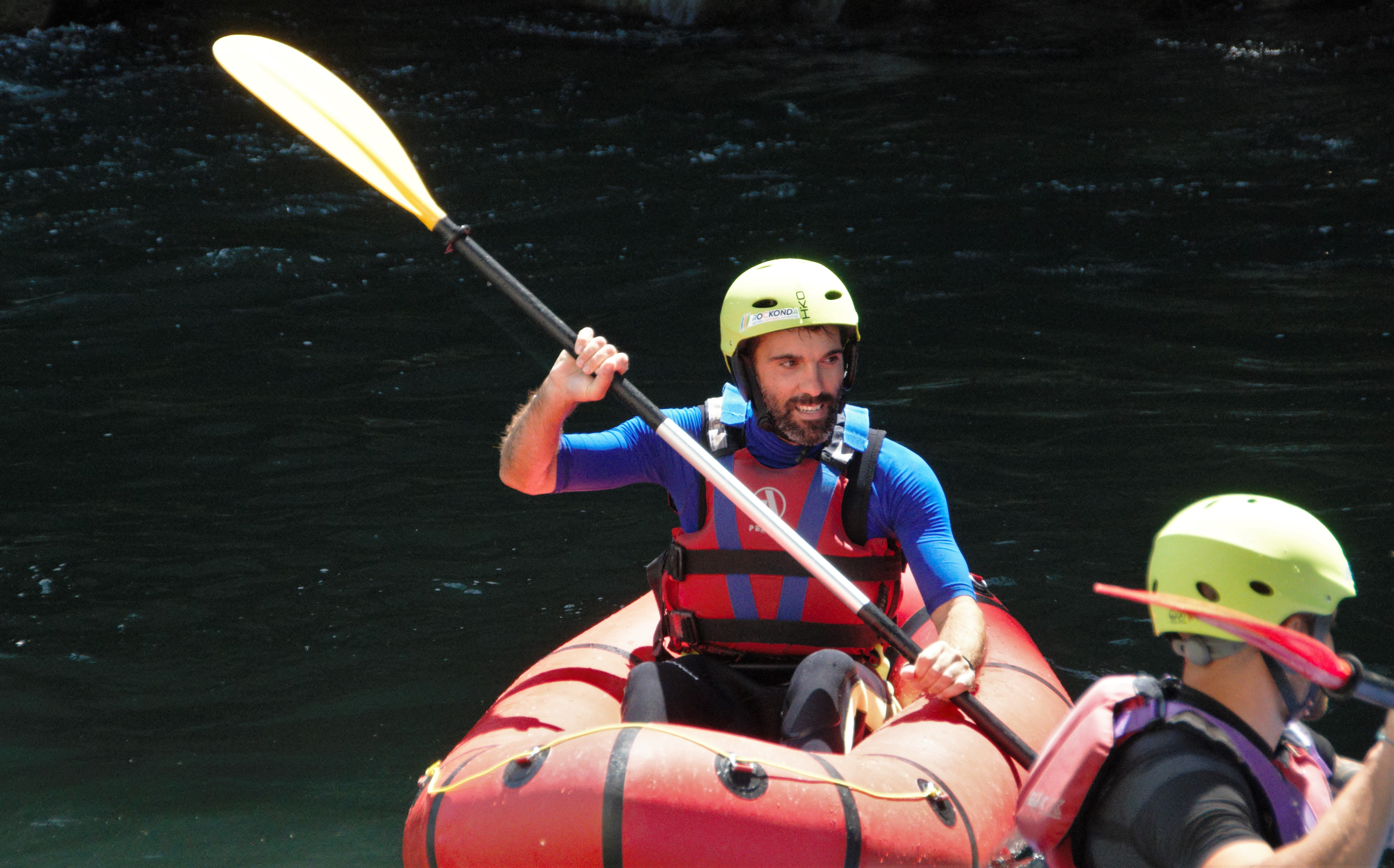
Packrafters wearing safety devices, such as helmets and personal flotation devices.

A typical cold water set-up including packraft with thigh straps and spray deck, safety lines, paddle, suitable clothing (such as a dry suit), inflation bag, helmet, backpack, dry bag weigh 7 kg (15 pounds). While they can be inflated by mouth or electric pumps, most contemporary users carry light weight inflation bags.

Distinction from "pool toy" In this article, packrafts/trail boats are differentiated from pool toys or flotation devices, which are intended for use in an enclosed and controlled body of water, such as a swimming pool. A packraft/trail boat is intended for use in open bodies of water.

Distinction from "man-portable" A packraft is distinguished from a strictly man-portable raft insofar as it is designed to be light enough to represent only a fraction of the total weight an individual can reasonably carry. A packraft can be carried for extended periods, along with food, water, shelter, and other supplies that would enable the individual to traverse long distances through difficult terrain. All rafts listed in this article weigh less than five pounds without paddles or spray decks.

== Usage ==
Packrafts are used in a variety of applications. These include:

- River crossings
- Whitewater (up to Class IV)
- Remote lake fishing
- Travel boats
- Adventure racing
- Open water crossings
- Remote river descents
- Hunting
- Canyoneering
- Aviator boats
- Rock climbing access
Different kinds of packrafting

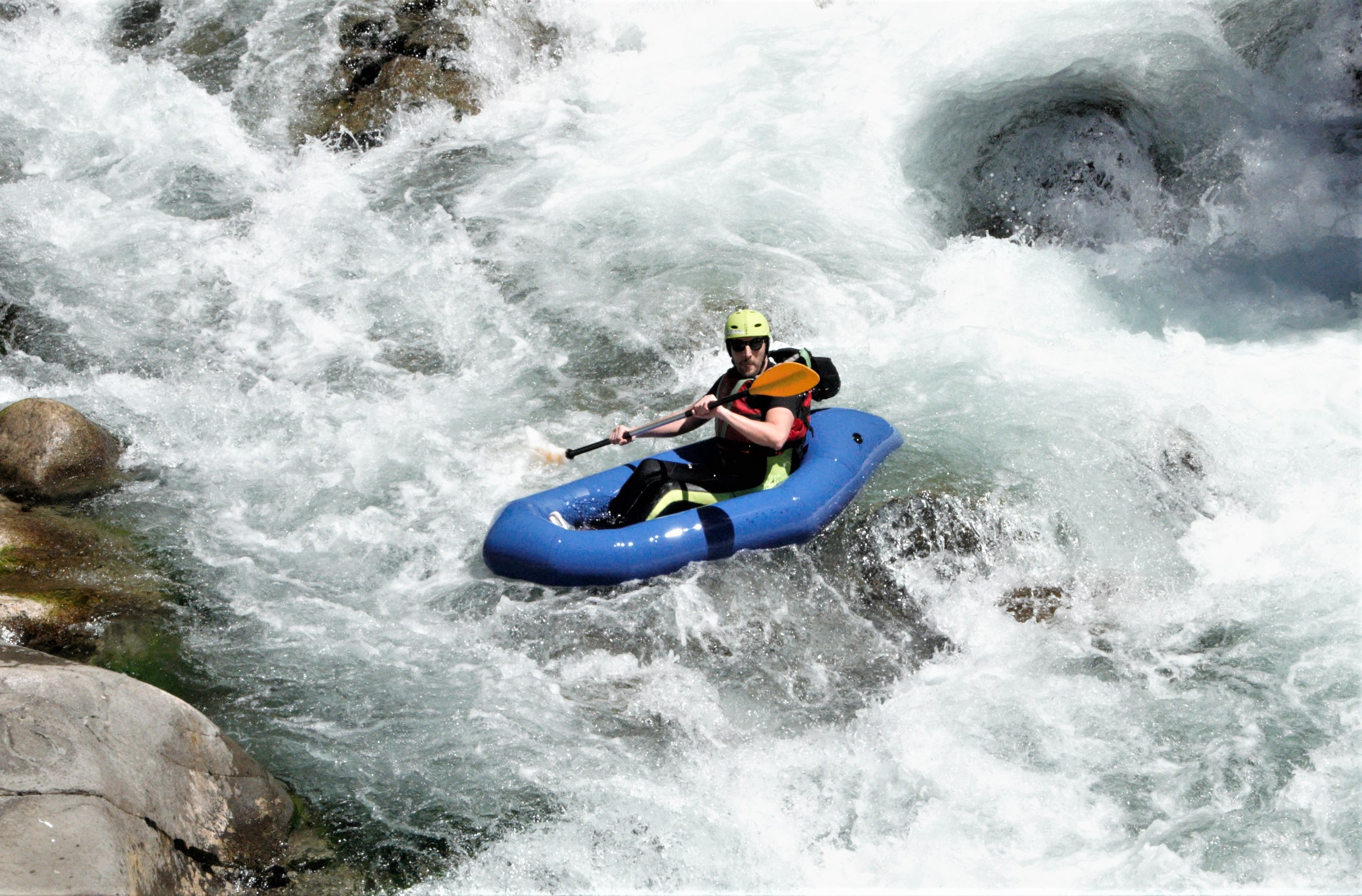
Whitewater rafting

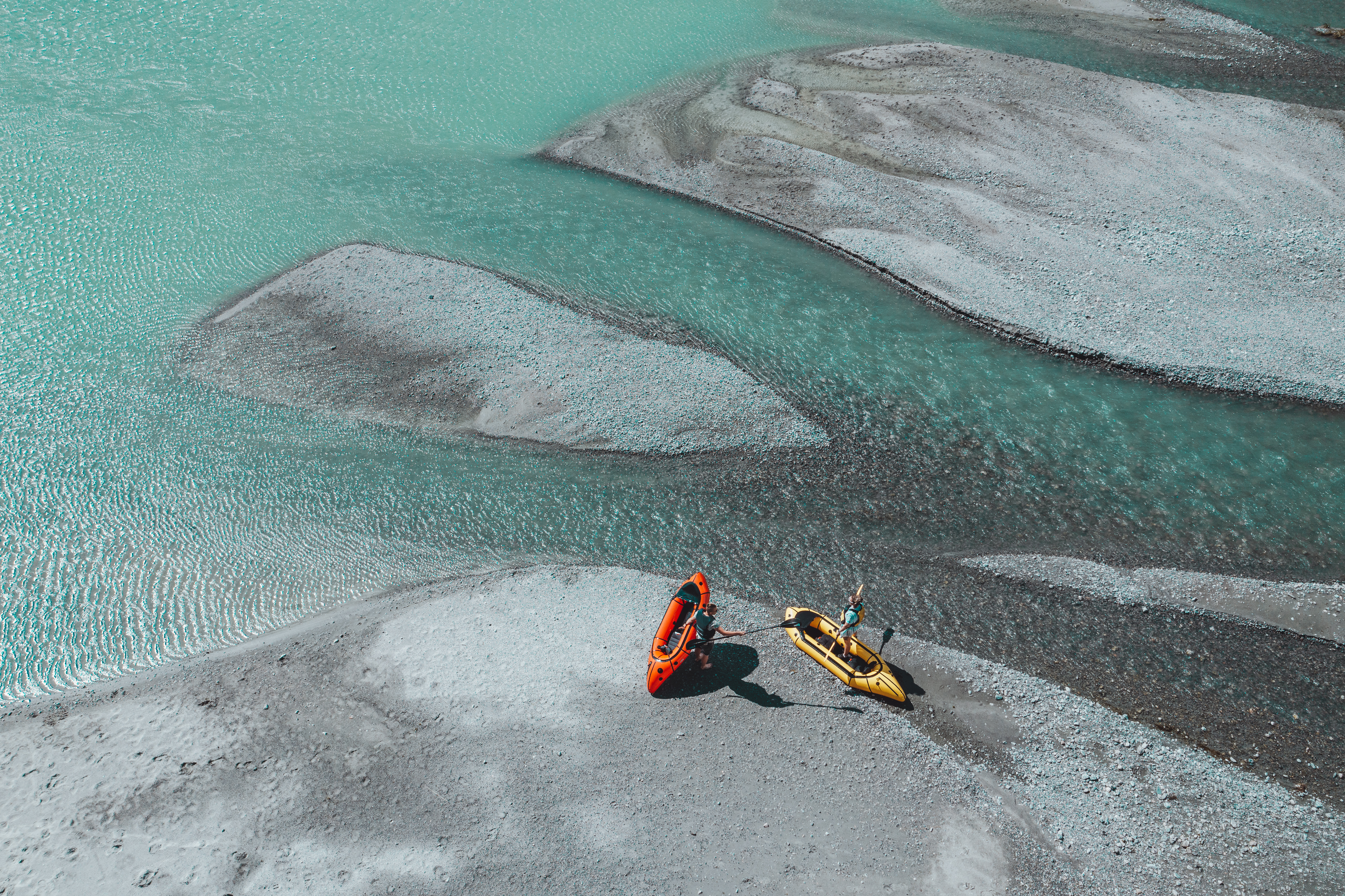
Packrafting in water from glaciers in Norway

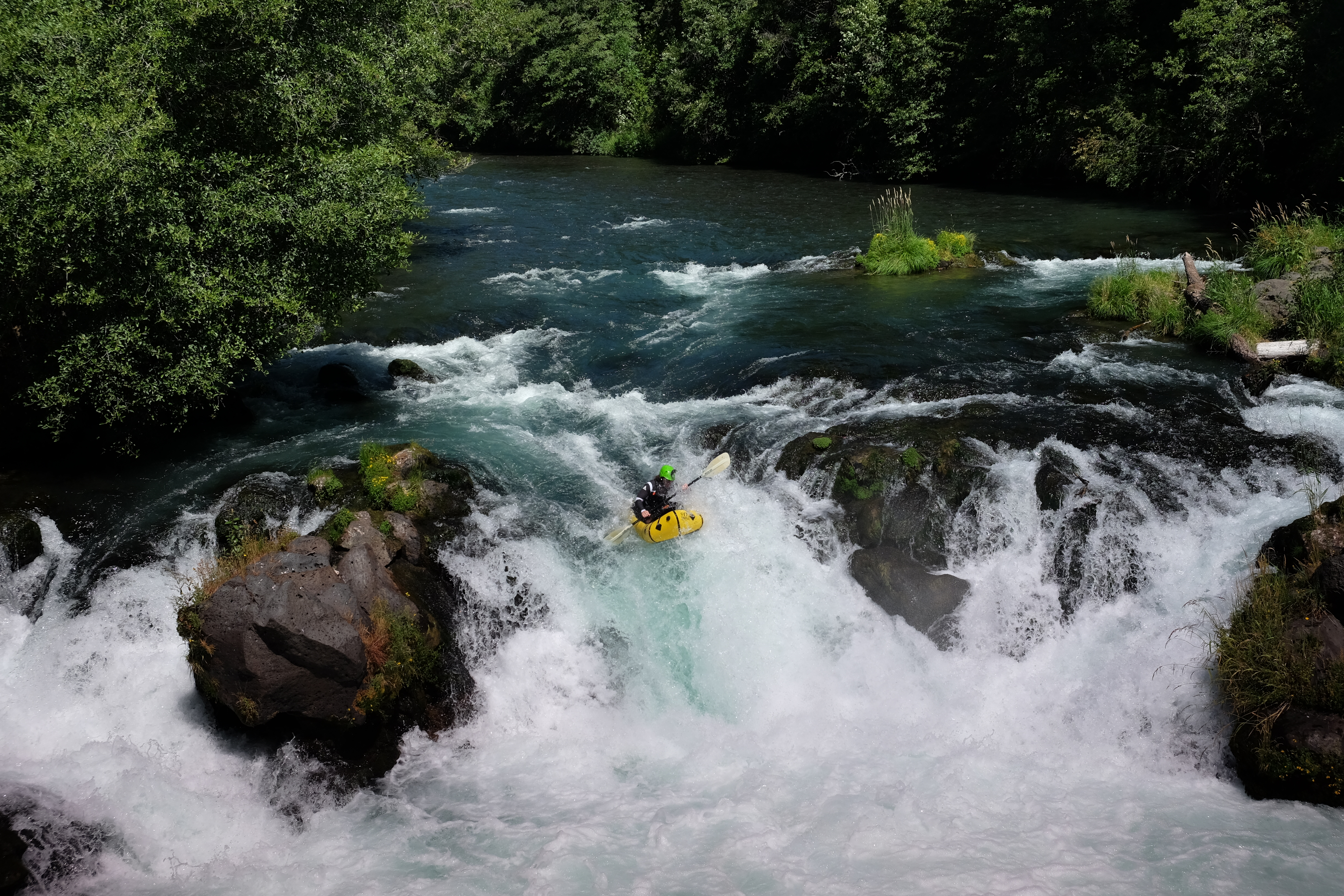
Whitewater (class IV) rafting on the White Salmon River in Washington

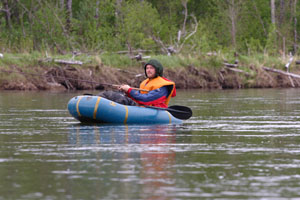
Fishing from a packraft

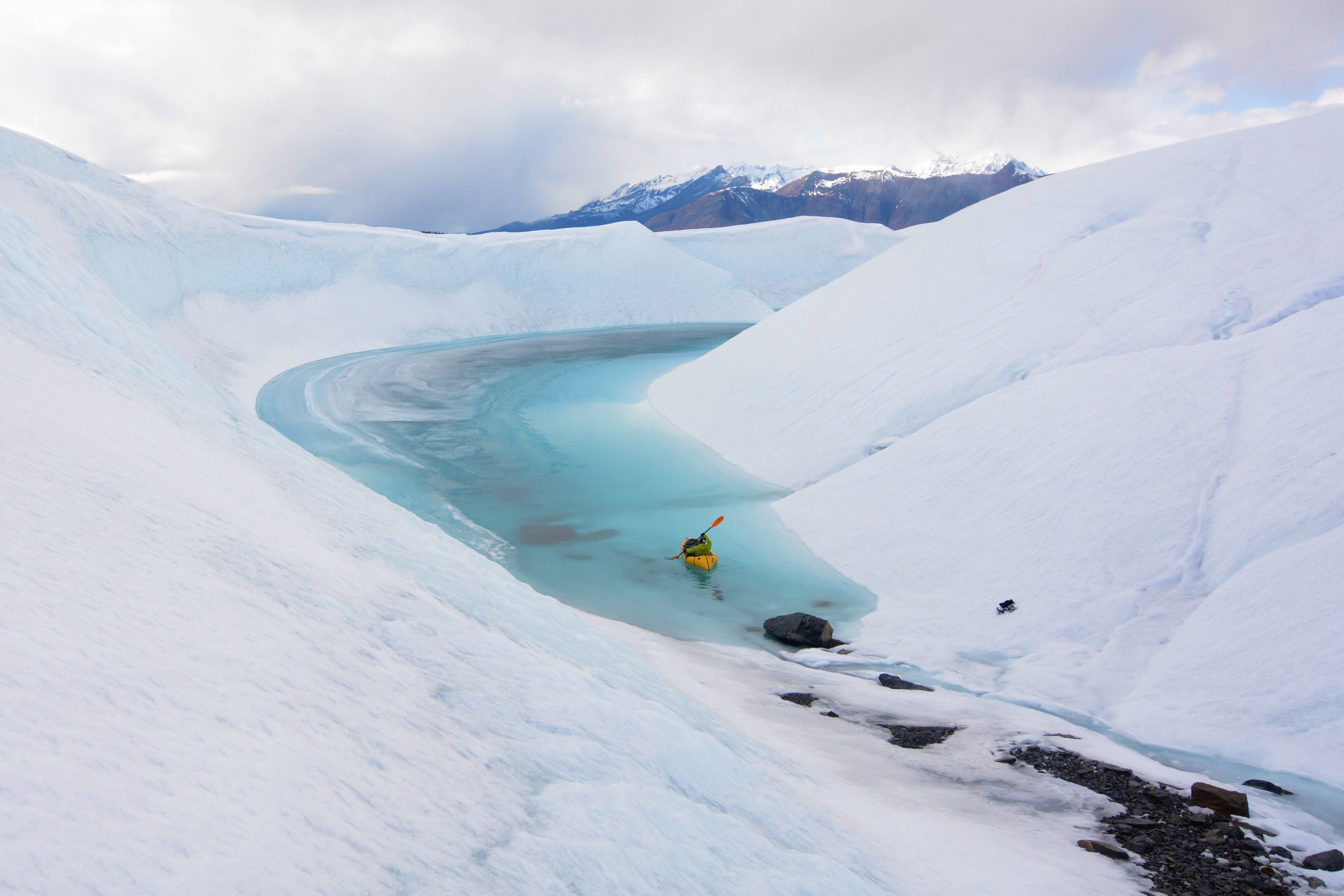
Ice canyoneering in Alaska

== Slackrafting ==
The expense of high quality packrafts costing $US500 – $US1000 has led to interest in using PVC inflatable boats and even pool toys costing $US15 – $US100 as a cheap alternative. These vinyl substitutes are not designed for anything more challenging than boating on still water no further than an easy swim to shore; they puncture easily, and they do not inflate to high pressures. For these reasons they have been described as 'slackrafts'; they do, however, offer some advantages over the even cheaper option of Liloing.

== Bikerafting ==
Bikerafting combines bicycling, often in the form of bikepacking, with packrafting as a single mode of backcountry travel. During the paddling phase, the bicycle’s wheels are usually removed, and the frame, wheels, luggage, and other equipment are strapped across the bow of the inflated raft, with the load positioned to maintain stability and avoid obstructing the paddler. The raft is then paddled across or along a waterway. At the next transition, the bicycle is reassembled and the raft is deflated, rolled, and carried on the bicycle or by the rider, often in a backpack fitted to carry the collapsed paddle. This activity type opens up a much broader array of trip and route options that would otherwise be blocked by terrain requiring the opposite activity phase such as remote coastal areas with river and channel crossing or linking lakes with lengthy portages.

== Comparison of packrafts ==
Maker	Model	Mass	Floor Material	Side Material	Capacity	Multi-chamber	Available
Kokopelli	Rodeo	6.0 kg (13.3 lb)	840D nylon	420D nylon	140 kg (300 lb)	Yes	Yes
CDOutdoors	L.A.B.	4.2 kg (9.3 lb)	840D nylon	210D nylon	125 kg (275 lb)	No	Yes
Advanced Elements	Packlite Kayak AE3021	1.8 kg (4 lb)			113 kg (250 lbs)	Yes	Yes
Alpacka	CuriYak	1.9 kg (4.2 lb)	800D	200D		No	Yes
Alpacka	Scout	1.6 kg (3.5 lb)	800D	200D		No	Yes
Feathercraft	BayLee 2	2.9 kg (6.5 lb)+	840D nylon	210D nylon	230 kg (500 lb)	Yes	No
Norseraft	Viking	2,7 kg (6 lb)	840D Nylon	210D Nylon	200 kg (441 lb)	No	Yes
Norseraft	Berserker	3,4 kg (7,5 lb)	840D Nylon	210D Nylon	200 kg (441 lb)	No	Yes
Flyweight Designs	Crossflyte	1.6 kg (3.5 lb)	70D & 210D nylon	70D nylon	140 kg (310 lb)	No	
Kokopelli	Hornet-lite	2.2 kg (4.9 lb)	210D nylon	70D nylon	125 kg (275 lb)	No	Yes
Kokopelli	Castaway	3.3 kg (7.3 lb)	840D nylon	210D nylon	125 kg (275 lb)	Yes	Yes
Kokopelli	Nirvana Self-Bailing	3.3 kg (7.3 lb)	840D Kevlar Nylon Blend	210D nylon	135 kg (300 lb)	Yes	Yes
Kokopelli	Recon Self-Bailing	7.2 kg (15.9 lb)	1000d Reinforced PVC	1000d Reinforced PVC	135 kg (300 lb)	Yes	Yes
Kokopelli	XPD	6.4 kg (14 lb)	1000d Reinforced PVC	1000d Reinforced PVC	135 kg (300 lb)	No	Yes
Kokopelli	Rogue Lite	2.5 kg (5.5 lb)	210D Kevlar Nylon Blend	210D nylon	135 kg (300 lb)	No	Yes
MRS	Microraft	3.0 kg (6.6 lb)	420D nylon	210D nylon	150 kg (330 lb)	No	Yes
MRS	Tulo	2.3 kg (5 lb)	420D nylon	210D nylon	150 kg (330 lb)	No	Yes
NRS	NRS PackRaft	3.4 kg (7.4 lb)	210D	70D		Yes	Yes
Supai	Matkat	0.79 kg (1.75 lb)	70D		147 kg (325 lb)	No	Yes
Supai	Canyon	0.68 kg (1.5 lb)			110 kg (250 lb)	No	Yes
Maker	Model	Mass	Floor Material	Side Material	Capacity	Multi-chamber	Available

== See also ==
- Coracle
- Kayak
- Canoe
- CDOutdoors
