= Open North American Championships =

Sprint sled dog race in Alaska

The Open North American Championships (ONAC) is a sprint sled dog race held annually in Fairbanks, Alaska. Established in 1946, it is the longest continuously run sled dog race in the world.

== History ==
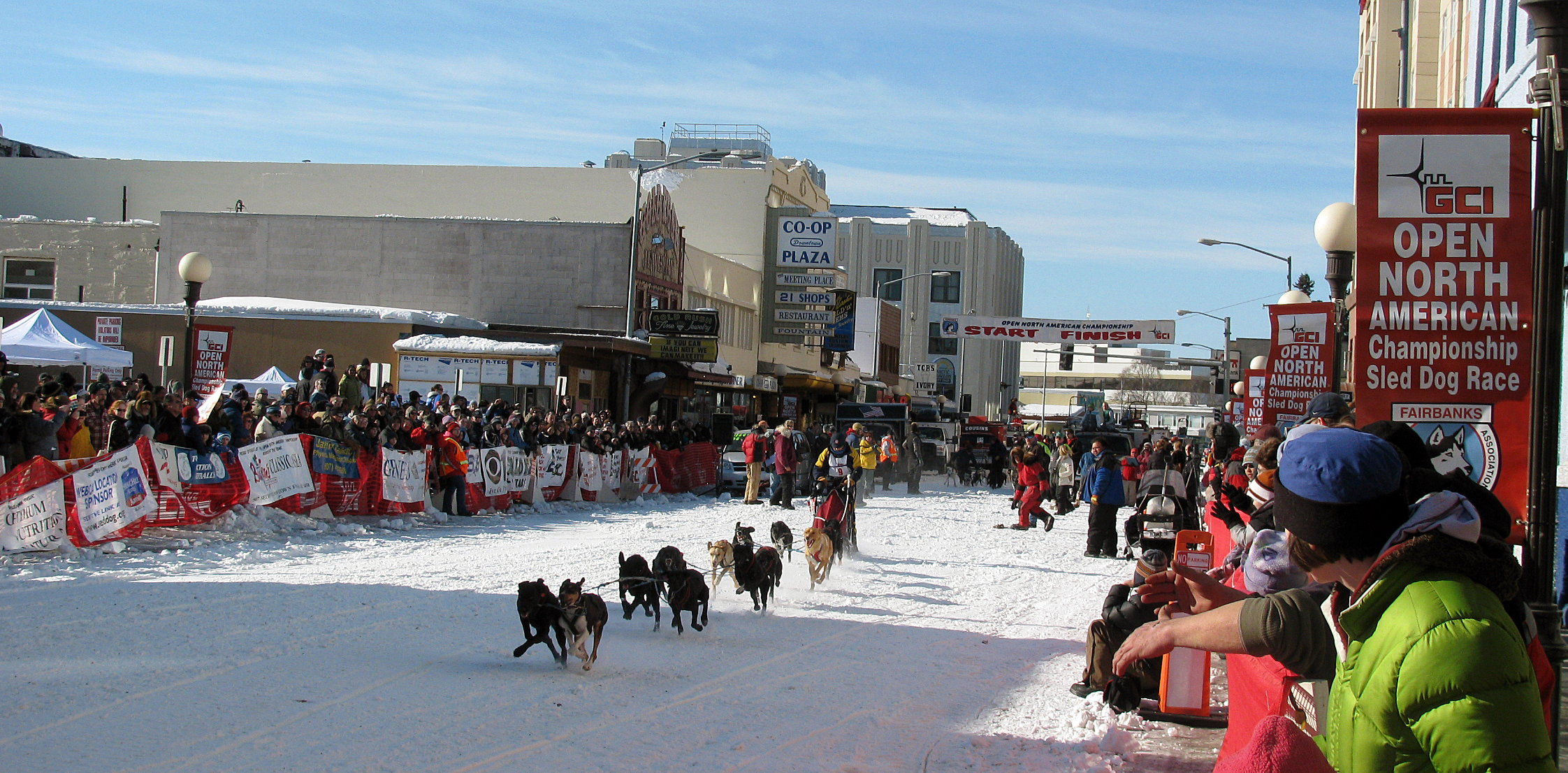
A musher racing in the Open North American Championships

Since 1927, sled dog racing has been practiced in the Fairbanks region of Alaska. Once a critical mode of transportation across Interior Alaska, sled dog racing has evolved into a central feature of the region’s sporting events. Between 1906 and 1916, the Nome Kennel Club organized races such as the All-Alaska Sweepstakes, a 408 miles (657 km) competition, and the shorter Borden Cup Marathon at 26 miles (42 km). These events drew significant attention until the decline of gold mining led to a shift in focus towards Interior Alaska. By 1927, the Washington-Alaska Military Cable and Telegraph System established the Signal Corps Race in Fairbanks. Originally covering a 58 miles (93 km) route between Fairbanks and Chatanika, the course climbed to 2,240 feet (680 m). By 1931, the format had changed to two 30 miles (48 km) heats, and in 1935, it evolved into a mid-distance race. Between 1927 and 1941, Fairbanks hosted at least three other major sled dog races including the Sweepstakes Trophy, the Women’s Sled Dog Championship and the H. Wendell Endicott Sweepstakes.

Dog racing in Fairbanks was temporarily suspended from 1942 to 1945 due to World War II. The sport resumed in 1946 with the inauguration of the Open North American Championships. Initially the race was a four-day event with three race segments of 18 miles (29 km) followed by a 20 miles (32 km) race segment along the Chena River and Tanana River. In 1953, the race moved to Creamer's Field Migratory Waterfowl Refuge, where it continues today. The Alaska Dog Mushers Association (ADMA) was founded in 1948 to promote the sport and organize the ONAC. The 2020 race was cancelled due to the COVID-19 pandemic. In 2025, the ONAC hosted its 79th year.

== Structure ==
Location of Fairbanks within Fairbanks North Star Borough, Alaska

The Open North American Championships is a three-day race featuring heats of 20.3 miles (32.7 km) on the first two days and a 27.6 miles (44.4 km) heat on the final day. Mushers must use a sled driven by one person and can have an unlimited number of dogs, with a minimum of five dogs per team. The team with the fastest cumulative time wins.

The ONAC attracts competitors from around the world, including teams from Canada, Europe, and Japan. Mushers consider the race course at Creamer’s Field to be the "Indianapolis 500" of sprint dog mushing, highlighting its prestige and the speed-focused nature of the event. Alongside the Fur Rendezvous Open World Championships in Anchorage and the Tok Race of Champions, the Open North American Championships is recognized as one of the Triple Crown events of Alaska sprint sled dog racing. Egil Ellis has won it 12 times, Blayne "Buddy" Streeper with 12 wins, and George Attla with eight wins.

== In popular culture ==
The 2021 documentary film Underdog tells the story of a Vermont dairy farmer who competes in the race.
