= Brandon Dubinsky =

American ice hockey player (born 1986)

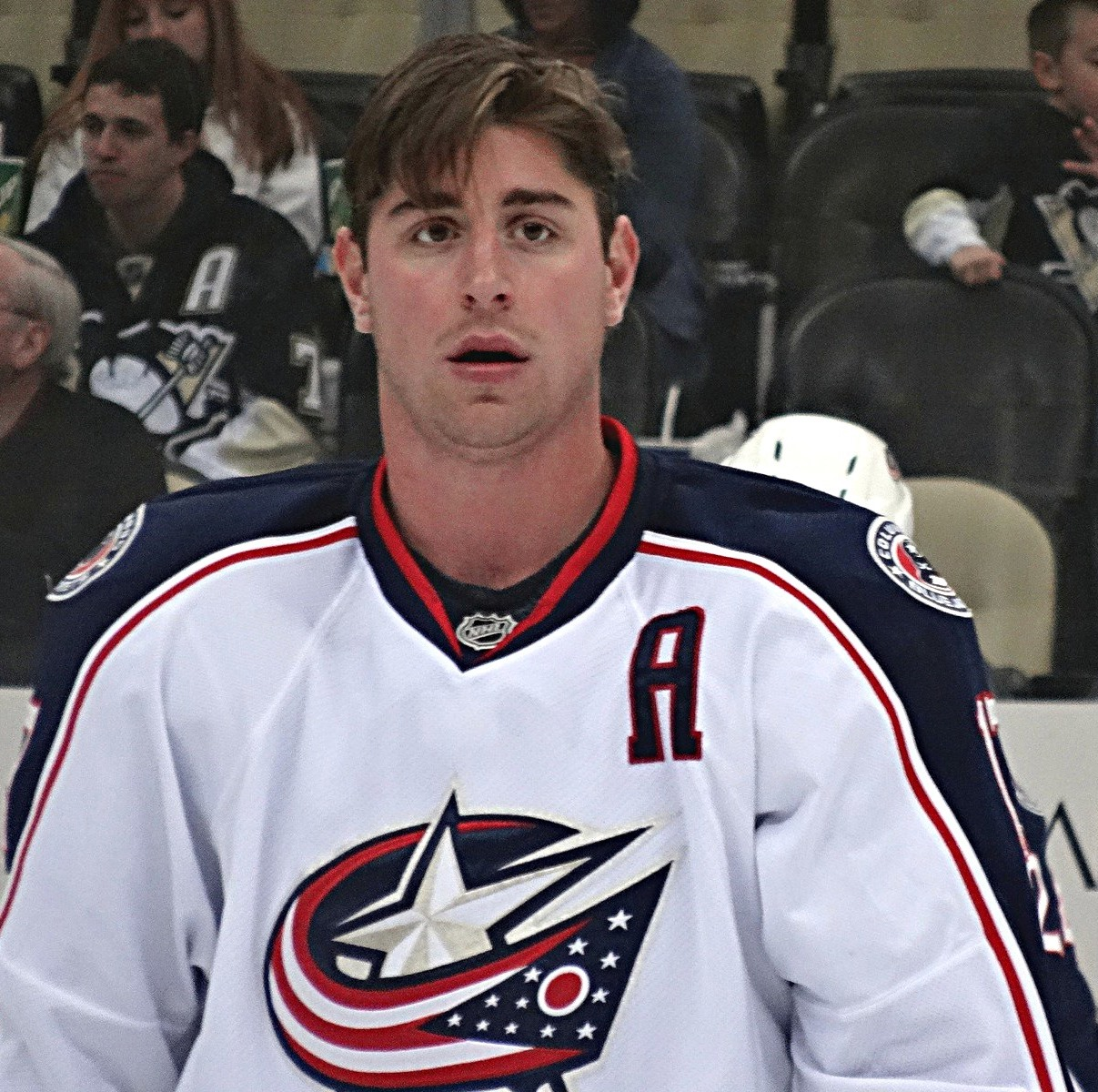
- Dubinsky with the Columbus Blue Jackets in November 2013
- Born: April 29, 1986 (age 40) Anchorage, Alaska, U.S.
- Height: 6 ft 1 in (185 cm)
- Weight: 209 lb (95 kg; 14 st 13 lb)
- Position: Centre / Left Wing
- Shot: Left
- Played for: New York Rangers; Columbus Blue Jackets
- National team: United States
- NHL draft: 60th overall, 2004; New York Rangers
- Playing career: 2006–2019

Brandon Grae Dubinsky (born April 29, 1986) is an American former professional ice hockey player. He previously played for the New York Rangers and Columbus Blue Jackets of the National Hockey League (NHL). Dubinsky was drafted 60th overall in the 2004 NHL entry draft by the Rangers.

== Playing career ==
Dubinsky was born to a Russian American family, in Anchorage, Alaska. He played minor ice hockey in Anchorage and Seattle through Sno-King Amateur Hockey Association, and graduated from Service High School in 2004. As a youth, he played in the 1999 Quebec International Pee-Wee Hockey Tournament with the Alaska All-Stars.

He spent his junior career with Portland Winter Hawks of the Western Hockey League (WHL) for four years, and was a two-time Western Conference second team All-Star before being drafted in the second round of the 2004 NHL Draft by the New York Rangers.

=== New York Rangers (2006–2012) ===
Dubinsky played for the Hartford Wolf Pack of the American Hockey League (AHL) for most of the 2006–07 season. He first played for the New York Rangers on March 8, 2007, against the New York Islanders.

Dubinsky scored his first NHL goal against Marc-André Fleury on November 8, 2007, in a 4–2 win against the Pittsburgh Penguins. Dubinsky was the 3rd star of the game. He spent much of the season centering the Rangers' first forward line with Jaromír Jágr and Sean Avery. He was one of sixteen rookies selected to participate in the 2008 YoungStars competition at the 56th NHL All-Star Game in Atlanta. He scored two goals and one assist and was named YoungStars Most Valuable Player. Dubinsky scored his first career playoff goal in the Eastern Conference Quarterfinals against the New Jersey Devils on April 13, 2008.

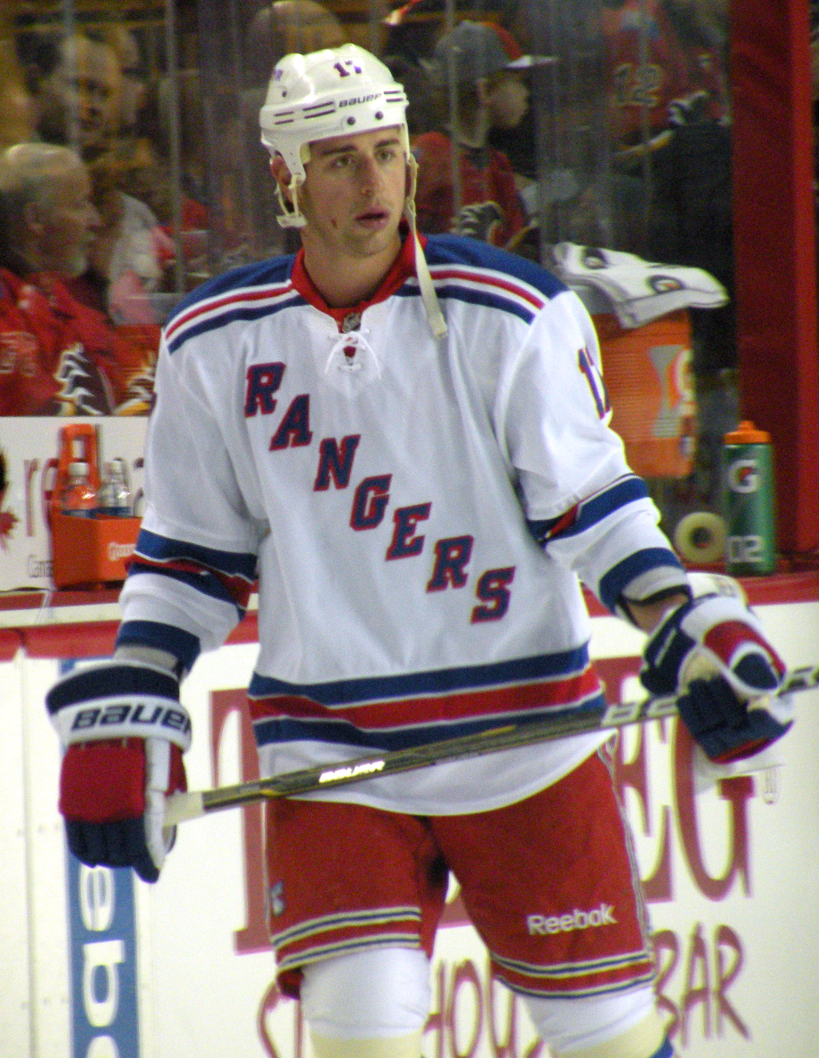
Dubinsky with the New York Rangers in October 2011

His successful rookie season was marked on April 4, 2008, when Dubinsky was awarded the Steven McDonald Extra Effort Award for the 2007–08 season and "Rookie of the Year" for the Rangers as voted by his teammates.

On May 12, 2008, Dubinsky scored a hat trick in his first World Championships, in Halifax, Nova Scotia, against Norway. Team USA went on to win the game 9–1.

On November 24, 2008, Dubinsky scored a Gordie Howe hat trick against the Phoenix Coyotes. He squared off against the Coyotes' tough guy Daniel Carcillo protecting the Rangers' netminder Henrik Lundqvist at 2:58 into the first, taking a five-minute major penalty for fighting. He then scored a wraparound goal 1 minute 15 seconds into the second period (which ended up being the game winner). Dubinsky then finished the "Gordie" with an assist to Dan Girardi, who scored a power play goal from the blue line at 7:37 into the third period. The Rangers won the game 4–1 and Dubinsky along with Lundqvist and Zherdev were named the three stars. Ranger coach Tom Renney called the feat a "Gordie Orr hat trick" claiming that Dubinsky "didn't do that well in the fight".

Dubinsky finished his second full season with one point more than his previous season. Despite a strong start with a game-winning goal in the Rangers' first game and a streak of 11 points in his first 11 games in 2008–09, he suffered a 20-game goal-scoring drought. On April 15, 2009, Dubinsky scored the game-winning goal with 8:17 remaining in the third period of the Rangers' first game of the 2009 Stanley Cup Playoffs, Eastern Conference Quarterfinals against the Washington Capitals.

After holding out at the beginning of the 2009–10 season and missing over a week of training camp, Dubinsky signed a two-year contract worth $3.7 million as a restricted free agent. Dubinsky tallied 3 goals and 10 points on the season before suffering a broken hand in a game against the Calgary Flames on November 7, 2009, which relegated him to the injured reserved list for more than a month.

Dubinsky returned to the Rangers' lineup on December 14 against the Atlanta Thrashers. Four games later, he scored his first goal in more than two months against the Carolina Hurricanes. The goal was the game-winner in a 3–1 Rangers victory. Despite missing over a month due to injury, Dubinsky finished the season with career highs in goals and points. After the 2010–11 season, Dubinsky avoided arbitration with the Rangers and signed a four-year, $16.8 million contract.

On April 14, 2012, in the opening minutes of what would be the Rangers' Game 2 3–2 overtime loss against the Ottawa Senators during the first round of the 2012 Stanley Cup Playoffs, an incensed Dubinsky, ejected after attacking Matt Carkner during a brawl on the ice, slammed a water cooler on his way out of the game.

=== Columbus Blue Jackets (2012–2019) ===
On July 23, 2012, Dubinsky was traded, along with Artem Anisimov, Tim Erixon, and a first round draft pick in 2013, to the Columbus Blue Jackets for Rick Nash, minor leaguer Steven Delisle and a conditional third round pick in the same draft. On July 11, 2014, Dubinsky signed a 6-year, $35.1 million contract extension with Columbus.

During the 2012–13 NHL lockout, Dubinsky played for the Alaska Aces of the ECHL and made his Blue Jackets debut once the NHL returned from the work stoppage.

Dubinsky was named an alternate captain of the Blue Jackets on October 8, 2015.

In October 2017 Dubinsky was stripped of his "A", by head coach John Tortorella, and it was given to defenceman Jack Johnson. During the 2017–18 season, Dubinsky suffered a fractured orbital during a fight with Zack Kassian of the Edmonton Oilers on December 12, 2017. He was subsequently placed on long term injured reserve.

== Personal life ==
Dubinsky was born in Anchorage, Alaska.

== Career statistics ==
=== Regular season and playoffs ===
			Regular season					Playoffs
Season	Team	League	GP	G	A	Pts	PIM	GP	G	A	Pts	PIM
2002–03	Portland Winter Hawks	WHL	44	8	18	26	35	7	2	2	4	10
2003–04	Portland Winter Hawks	WHL	71	30	48	78	137	5	0	2	2	6
2004–05	Portland Winter Hawks	WHL	68	23	36	59	160	7	4	5	9	8
2005–06	Portland Winter Hawks	WHL	51	21	46	67	98	12	5	10	15	24
2005–06	Hartford Wolf Pack	AHL	—	—	—	—	—	11	5	5	10	14
2006–07	Hartford Wolf Pack	AHL	71	21	22	43	115	7	1	3	4	12
2006–07	New York Rangers	NHL	6	0	0	0	2	—	—	—	—	—
2007–08	New York Rangers	NHL	82	14	26	40	79	10	4	4	8	12
2008–09	New York Rangers	NHL	82	13	28	41	112	7	1	3	4	18
2009–10	New York Rangers	NHL	69	20	24	44	54	—	—	—	—	—
2010–11	New York Rangers	NHL	77	24	30	54	100	5	2	1	3	2
2011–12	New York Rangers	NHL	77	10	24	34	110	9	0	2	2	14
2012–13	Alaska Aces	ECHL	17	9	7	16	22	—	—	—	—	—
2012–13	Columbus Blue Jackets	NHL	29	2	18	20	76	—	—	—	—	—
2013–14	Columbus Blue Jackets	NHL	76	16	34	50	98	6	1	5	6	6
2014–15	Columbus Blue Jackets	NHL	47	13	23	36	43	—	—	—	—	—
2015–16	Columbus Blue Jackets	NHL	75	17	31	48	71	—	—	—	—	—
2016–17	Columbus Blue Jackets	NHL	80	12	29	41	91	5	1	1	2	6
2017–18	Columbus Blue Jackets	NHL	62	6	10	16	33	6	0	0	0	6
2018–19	Columbus Blue Jackets	NHL	61	6	8	14	36	10	1	0	1	6
NHL totals			823	153	285	438	905	58	10	16	26	70

=== International ===
Year	Team	Event	Result	GP	G	A	Pts	PIM
2008	United States	WC	6th	4	3	0	3	2
2010	United States	WC	13th	6	3	7	10	2
2016	United States	WCH	7th	2	0	1	1	4
Senior totals				12	6	8	14	8

== Awards and honours ==
Award	Year
WHL
West Second All-Star Team	2004
West Second All-Star Team	2006

Awards and achievements
Preceded by Jed Ortmeyer	Steven McDonald Extra Effort Award winner 2008	Succeeded by Ryan Callahan
