= Alaska Mountain Wilderness Classic =

American adventure challenge

The race start of the Alaska Mountain Wilderness Classic in Chicken in 2006.

The Alaska Mountain Wilderness Classic (sometimes called the Alaska Wilderness Classic) is an adventure challenge that espouses purity of style and zero impact. Started in 1982 as a 150-mile (240 km) wilderness traverse, the Classic has crossed various mountain ranges throughout Alaska with some routes covering nearly 250 miles (400 km). According to Outside magazine, many consider it "the toughest wilderness challenge in the world."

The rules are simple: start to finish with no outside support, requiring that participants carry all food and equipment; human-powered; leave no trace; and rescue is up to the individual to resolve. The most common form of transportation is by foot and packraft, although bicycles, skis, and paragliders have been used by intrepid participants. Beginning in 2004, participants have been required to carry satellite phones or Satellite emergency notification device like the Garmin inReach to facilitate emergency rescues. Traditionally, the same route has been used for three years in a row, with each year being a different month (June, July, or August).

The organization of the challenge is grass-roots, having no affiliation to any organization or group, while generally fewer than 30 people enter in any one year. The Classic is often perceived as a race, but most certainly not a race. It has had an influence on American adventure racing, backcountry use of the packraft, and ultralight hiking is significant. In addition to the summer challenge, there is an even more low-key unaffiliated winter event, the Alaska Mountain Wilderness Ski Classic, which has taken place annually since 1987 with travel through the Chugach Mountains, Alaska Range, Brooks Range, and Wrangell-St. Elias.

During the 2014 classic, experienced participant Rob Kehrer died after his boat flipped while packrafting on the Tana River in Wrangell St. Elias National Park. His body was found on a gravel bar four miles downstream.

== Routes ==
=== 1982–1984 ===
Hope to Homer (Kenai Peninsula), 150 miles (240 km)

- Start 60.92003°N 149.64453°W
- Finish 59.60058°N 151.40925°W

Year	Month	Fastest Finisher(s)	Time	Course Record?	No. Starters	No. Scratches	Finisher Percent
1982	August	Roman Dial	6 d, 10 hrs, 15m		10	6	40%
1983	September	Roman Dial and Jim Lokken	4 d, 20 hrs		22	10	45%
1984	August	Dave Manzer	3 d, 12 hrs	Yes	35	17	49%

=== 1985–1987 ===
Mentasta to Denali National Park (Alaska Range), 235 miles (378 km)

- Start 62.92890°N 143.80020°W
- Finish 63.84751°N 149.01553°W

Year	Month	Fastest Finisher(s)	Time	Course Record?	No. Starters	No. Scratches	Finisher Percent
1985	August	Hank Timm	7d, 22hrs, 12m		14	12	14%
1986	?August?	Hank Timm	5d, 23hrs		11	6	45%
1987	August	Hank Timm and Randy Pitney	4d, 18hrs, 27m	Yes	14	8	43%

=== 1988–1990 ===
Nabesna to McCarthy (Wrangell – Saint Elias Wilderness), 150 miles (240 km)

- Start 62.37044°N 143.01182°W
- Finish 61.43284°N 142.92330°W
- 1988 – Roman Dial
- 1989 – David Manzer, Adrian Crane and Tom Possert
- 1990 – Brant McGee and Jeff Gedney

=== 1991–1993 ===
Gates of the Arctic Wilderness (Brooks Range), 130 miles (210 km)

- Start 67.929040°N 149.827665°W
- Checkpoint 68.05829°N 150.85887°W
- Finish 67.409823°N 150.107743°W
- 1991 – Brant McGee and Adrian Crane (course record: 2 days 6 hours 18 minutes)
- 1992 – Brant McGee and Dave Dixon
- 1993 – Gordy Vernon

=== 1994–1996 ===
Donnelly to McKinley Village (Alaska Range), 140 miles (230 km)

- Start 63.52999°N 145.85934°W
- Finish 63.63445°N 148.78658°W
- 1994 – Frazier Miller
- 1995 – Clark Saunders (course record: 2 days 12 hours 20 minutes)
- 1996 – Steve Reifenstuhl and Rocky Reifenstuhl

=== 1997–1999 ===
Hope to Homer (Kenai Peninsula), 150 miles (240 km)

- Start 60.92003°N 149.64453°W
- Finish 59.60058°N 151.40925°W
- 1997 – Gordy Vernon and Thai Verzone
- 1998 – Gordy Vernon
- 1999 – Gabriel Lydic, Laona DeWilde Lydic and David Arvey

=== 2000–2002 ===
Nabesna to McCarthy (Wrangell – Saint Elias Wilderness), 150 miles (240 km)

- Start 62.37044°N 143.01182°W
- Finish 61.43284°N 142.92330°W
- 2000 – Steve Reifenstuhl and Rocky Reifenstuhl
- 2001 – Steve Reifenstuhl and Rocky Reifenstuhl
- 2002 – Roman Dial (course record: 2 days 4 hours 24 minutes)

=== 2003–2005 ===
Eureka to Talkeetna (Talkeetna Mountains), 160 miles (260 km)

- 2003 – Hans Neidig, Chris Robertson and Paul Hanis
- 2004 – Gordy Vernon and Thai Verzone
- 2005 – Robert Schnell, Jason Geck, Tyler Johnson and Rory Stark (course record: 1 day 23 hours 29 minutes)

=== 2006–2008 ===
Chicken to Central (Tanana-Yukon Uplands), 180 miles (290 km)

Year	Month	Fastest Finisher(s)	Time	Course Record?	No. Starters	No. Scratches	Finisher Percent
2006	month	Robert Schnell and Chris Robertson	4d, 10hrs, 42min	Yes			
2007	month	Robert Schnell and Chris Robertson					
2008	June	Butch Allen, Jim McDonough, Tyler Johnson and Craig "Chunk" Barnard			16	7	56%

=== 2009–2011 ===
Gerstle River/Donnelly to McKinley Village (Alaska Range), 180 miles (290 km)

- 2009 – Robert Schnell, Chris Robertson and Andrew Skurka (course record: 3 days 17 hours 54 minutes)
- 2010 – Robert Schnell, Chris Robertson, Todd Kasteler and Danny Powers
- 2011 – Tyler Johnson, Todd Kasteler, Luc Mehl and John Sykes

=== 2012–2014 ===
Thompson Pass to Lakina River Bridge (Chugach Mountains, Wrangell – Saint Elias Wilderness), 120 miles (190 km) - 180 miles (290 km)

- Start 61.12456°N 145.67096°W
- Finish 61.37459°N 143.34841°W
- 2012 – Luc Mehl, Josh Mumm (3d 22.5h, Bremner Route)
- 2013 – Lee Helzer, Steve Duby, Len Jenkins (Slowest first completion: 7 days, 8 hours, 44 minutes)
- 2014 – Gerard Ganey, Todd Tumolo (course record: 3d 10h, Ice Route)

=== 2015 ===
Rob Kehrer Memorial Route, Peters Hills to Nancy Lakes via Rohn (Western Alaska Range, Susitna Valley), 280 miles (450 km)

- Start 62.333008°N 150.534968°W
- Checkpoint 62.29489°N 153.37348°W
- Finish 61.61978°N 150.18416°W
- 2015 - Josh Mumm (course record: 5 days, 21 hours, 40 minutes)

=== 2016–2018 ===
Galbraith Lake to Wiseman (Brooks Range), 115 miles (185 km)

- Start 68.47948°N 149.49739°W
- Finish 67.40967°N 150.10889°W
- 2016 - Todd Tumolo and Luc Mehl (course & challenge record: 1 day, 10 hours)
- 2017 - Tobias Schwoerer and Harlow Robinson
- 2018 - Tom Moran and Jay Cable

=== 2019–2021 ===
Cantwell to Sheep Mountain (Talkeetna Mountains), 160 miles (260 km)

- Start 63.37164°N 148.78586°W
- Finish 61.81213°N 147.49761°W
- 2019 - Tobias Schwoerer and Jeremy Vandermeer
- 2020 - Sam Hooper
- 2021 - Nick Treinen (course record: 3 days, 10 hours)

=== 2022–2024 ===
Little Tok River to McCarthy, Alaska (Wrangell–St. Elias), 190 miles (310 km)

- Start 62.97020°N 143.31488°W
- Finish 61.43318°N 142.94468°W

Year	Month	Fastest Finisher(s)	Time	Course Record?	No. Starters	No. Scratches	Finisher Percent
2022	June	Nick Treinen and Michael Versteeg	4 d, 13 hrs				
2023	July	Matt Kupilik, John Pekar, Julian Chapin and Adam Smith	4 d, 8 hrs		18	4	77%
2024	August	Sam Hooper	3 d, 13 hrs, 3 min	Yes	28	6	79%

=== 2025–2027 ===
Kenai Lake to Hicks Creek, 160 miles (260 km) to 185 miles (298 km)

- Start 60.40538°N 149.36252°W
- Finish 61.78955°N 147.93908°W

Year	Month	Fastest Finisher(s)	Time	Course Record?	No. Starters	No. Scratches	Finisher Percent
2025	June	Nick Roman	5d 17h 2min	no	23	16	30%
2026	July	Ben Americus & Iulian Ovod-Everett	5d 11h 28min	Yes	28	23	18%
2027	August						
