= Service High School =

Coordinates: 61°08′19″N 149°46′53″W

Robert Service High School

Location
- 5577 Abbott Road; Anchorage, Alaska 99507; United States

Information
- Established: 1971 (55 years ago)
- School district: Anchorage
- CEEB code: 020004
- Principal: Imtiaz Azzam
- Staff: 62.92 (FTE)
- Grades: 9–12
- Enrollment: 1,518 (2024–2025)
- Student to teacher ratio: 24.13
- Colors: Green and gold
- Mascot: Cougar
- Website: www.asdk12.org/service

Robert Service High School is a public high school in Anchorage, Alaska. It had an enrollment of 1,779 students as of August 2, 2016. Serving grades 9 through 12, the school was named for the poet Robert W. Service. Part of the Anchorage School District, the school opened in 1971 and was the last of four high schools built by the district (its lineal predecessor, the Anchorage Independent School District) within a decade. Service High originally operated as Service-Hanshew; as was the case common within Anchorage during that time, junior and senior high schools shared a single building. Included in the case with other junior-senior high schools in Anchorage, a separate structure was built to educate the junior student body and referred as Hanshew Middle School in the period of the 1980s oil glut. This is located approximately two miles west of Service along the Lake Otis Parkway. The school completed a partial renovation in 2005. The official school colors are green and gold, and its mascot is the cougar. Service High School's current principal is Imtiaz Azzam.

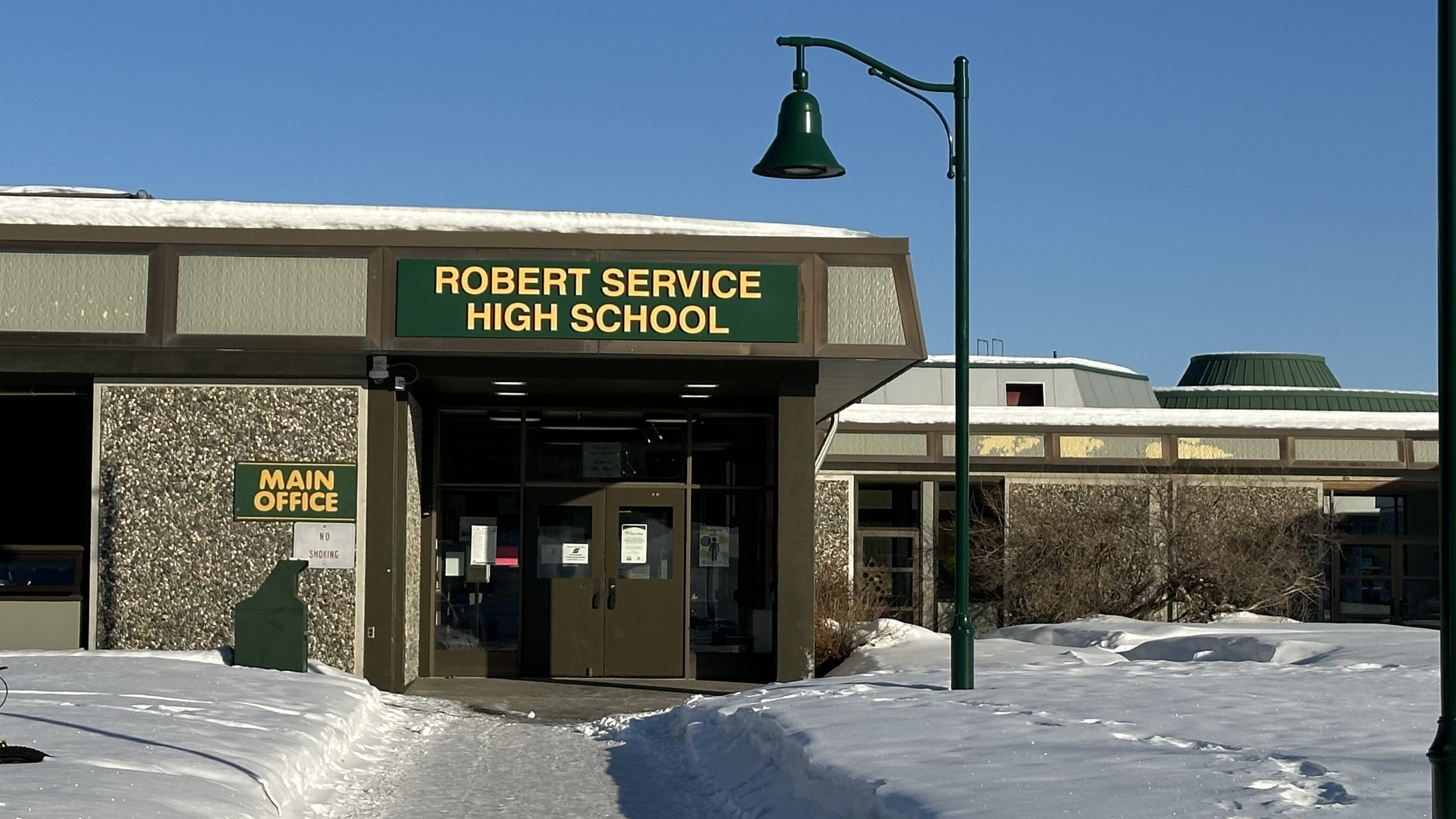
Main Entrance

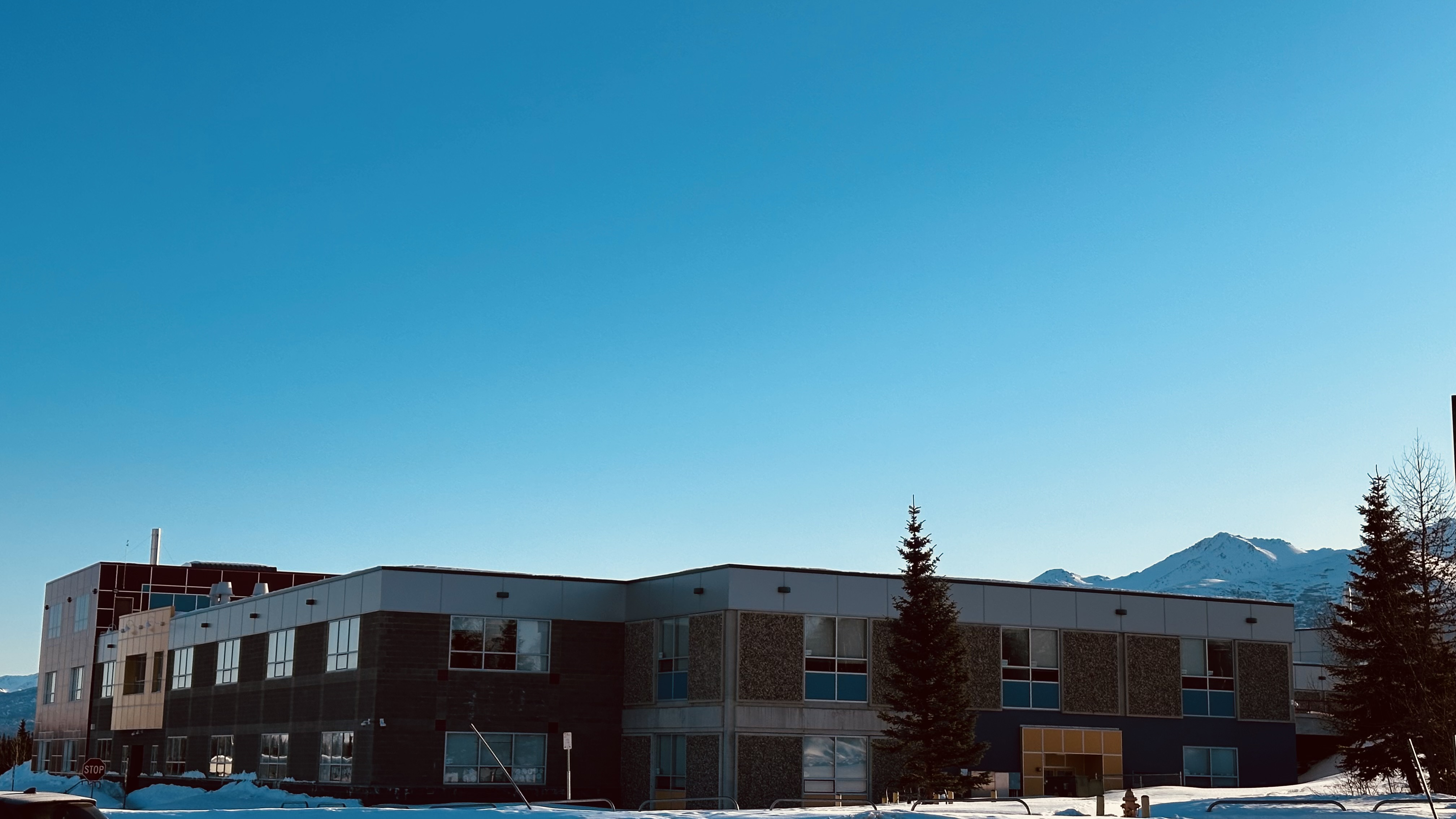
Main Building

== Demographics ==
The ethnic and gender demographics for Service High School during the 2013-14 year were the following:

Ethnicity	Percentage (%)
American Indian / Alaska Native	8
Asian	12
Black	4
Hawaiian Native / Pacific Islander	2
Hispanic	11
White	49
Two or More Races	14

Gender	Percentage (%)
Male	52
Female	48

A total of 34% of the school was categorized as economically disadvantaged as measured by the number of students who qualified for a free or reduced price lunch.

== Advanced Placement (AP) Courses ==
There are 36 total AP courses available at Service High School including AP Human Geography, AP Computer Science A, AP Computer Science Principles, AP US History, AP US Government & Politics, AP Economics Macro and Micro, AP Psychology, AP Literature and Composition, AP Language and Composition, AP Calculus AB and BC, AP Statistics, AP Chemistry, AP Biology, AP Environmental Science, AP Physics 1: Algebra-Based, AP 2-D Art & Design Portfolio, AP Spanish Language & Culture, AP Japanese Language & Culture, AP German Language & Culture, AP World History, AP Drawing Portfolio, and the chance for the AP capstone diploma when completing AP Seminar and AP Research.

== Academic Programs ==
- Biomedical Career Academy (BCA)

A four-year program offered at Service High School, and a certified Project Lead The Way (PLTW) program. Service High School BCA is also involved with HOSA, participating in the annual State Leadership Conferences and International Leadership Conferences. Courses taken for the BCA program include PLTW Principles of Biomedical Sciences, PLTW Human Body Systems, PLTW Medical Interventions, and PLTW Biomedical Innovations.

- Seminar Program

A program of mixed curriculum with language arts and social studies where students are encouraged to share their ideas and inquire each other of philosophy, culture, historical ideas, and the world today.

== Accreditation ==
Service High School is accredited by the Northwest Association of Schools and Colleges and participates in sports and extramural activities sponsored by the Alaska School Activities Association.

== Notable alumni ==
- Tommy Beaudreau, attorney and former official in the United States Department of the Interior
- Thomas A. Birkland, professor of public policy at North Carolina State University
- Emma Broyles, Miss America 2022
- Matthew Burtner, musician, composer, and inventor of the metasaxophone (1988 graduate)
- Brandon Dubinsky, NHL forward, New York Rangers (2004 graduate)
- Andy Enz, mixed martial artist (2010 graduate)
- Anna Fairclough, member of the Alaska Senate from Eagle River (1976 graduate)
- Tyler Kornfield (born 1991), Olympic cross-country skier (2009 graduate)
- Larry Sanger, Wikipedia co-founder (1986 graduate)
- Mark Schlereth, NFL guard and ESPN analyst (1984 graduate)
- Gus Schumacher, World Cup and Olympic cross-country skier, 2024 Minneapolis World Cup Champion (2018 graduate)
- Jeremy Teela, 2002, 2006, 2010 US Olympian, Biathlon (1995 graduate)
- Cathy Tilton, member of the Alaska House of Representatives from Wasilla (1980 graduate)
