= Thomas A. Birkland =

American political scientist

Thomas A. Birkland (born 1961) is a political scientist specializing in the study of public policy. Books include An Introduction to Public Policy (2001, 2nd ed., 2005), After Disaster (1997) (winner of the Aaron Wildavsky Enduring Contribution Award), and Lessons of Disaster (2006). He began his career at the University at Albany, The State University of New York. From 2007 to 2017 he was the William Kretzer Distinguished Professor of Public Policy in the School of Public and International Affairs at North Carolina State University. His work continues to focus on public policy theory, primarily in the fields of disasters, accidents, and homeland security.
