= Greyster =

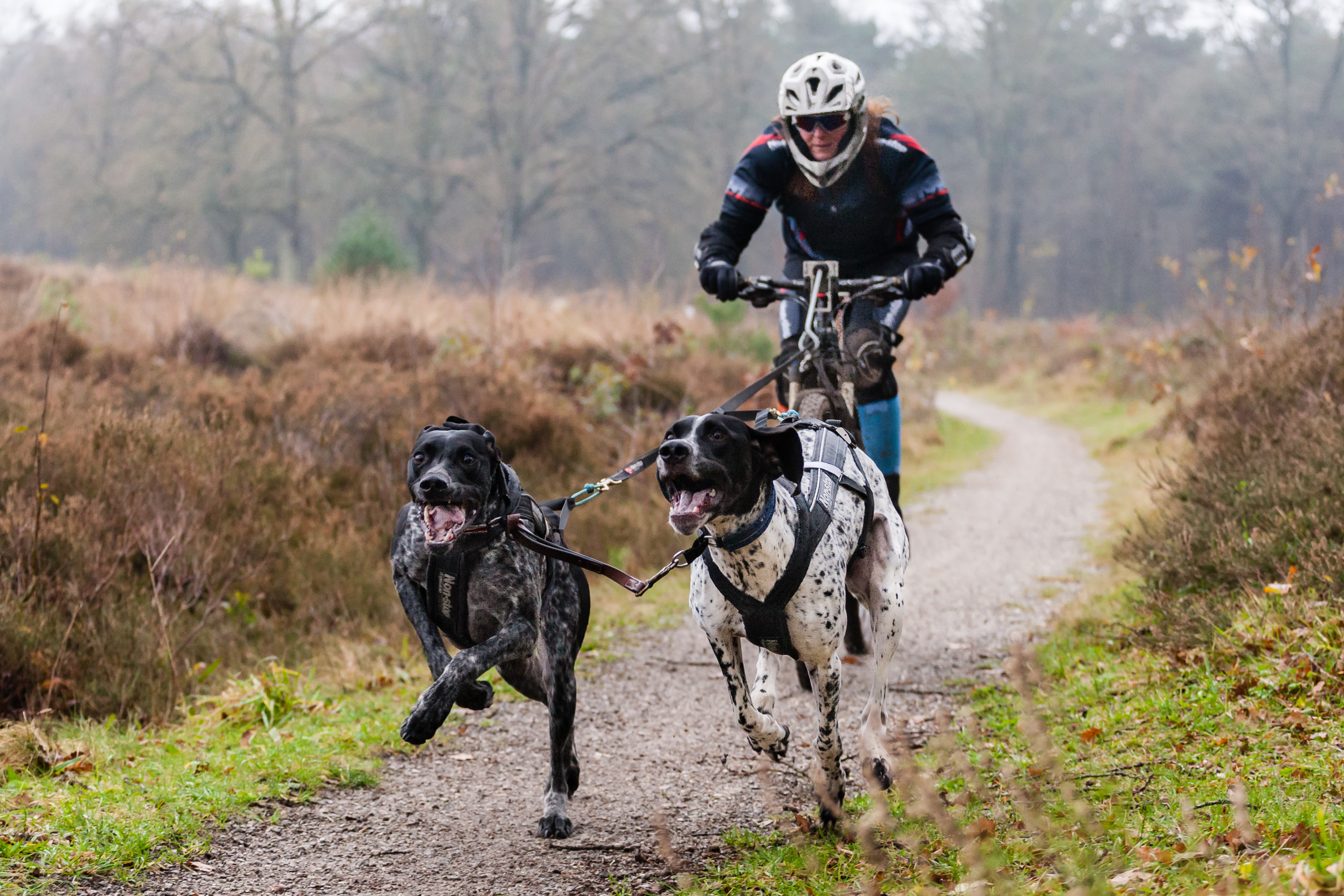
- Two Greysters bikejoring
- Origin: Norway
- Foundation stock: Greyhound, German Shorthair Pointer

The Greyster is a type of sled dog bred for sled dog racing, especially dryland sports like canicross and bikejoring. The greyster is crossbred from the Greyhound and the German Shorthair Pointer.

The greyster gets its endurance and its enthusiasm from the German Shorthaired Pointer and its speed from the Greyhound.

The name "greyster" is a portmanteau of Greyhound and Pointer.

== History ==
After World War II, skijor and pulka style dog sled racing gained rapidly in popularity in Norway and neighboring Scandinavian countries. These styles of racing required small, fast teams of 1-4 dogs who competed over short, hilly distances of 15–30 kilometres (9.3–18.6 mi). Required to use purebred dogs by the Norwegian Sled Dog Racing Association, the German Shorthair Pointer quickly emerged as the dog breed of choice. At the beginning of the 1970s, the "sled pointer" had emerged, a pointing dog who was bred exclusively for sledding and not hunting. During the 1970s, "Nome-style" sled racing, which mimicked the big sled dog teams running long distances and overnighting in subzero temperatures seen in North American-style races, started to attract interest in Scandinavia. In 1974, the first Nome-style sled race, the Skjelbreia Sweepstakes, was hosted near Oslo. For this style of racing, Norwegian mushers began to import Alaskan huskies; popularized by mushers like Stein Havard Fjelstad and Roger Leegaard who traveled to Alaska to race in the Iditarod. However, as a performance crossbreed, the Alaskan husky could not be legally raced in Norway until 1985, when the Norwegian Sled Dog Racing Association removed the requirement that sled dogs be purebred.

This new ruling also paved the way for Nordic-style mushers to breed their best performing dogs regardless of breed, with mushers mixing Greyhound with German Shorthair Pointer to produce the greyster. These Nordic-style crossbreeds gained in popularity across Europe and later North America, especially with the rise in popularity of dryland mushing, such as bikejoring and canicross.

== Description ==
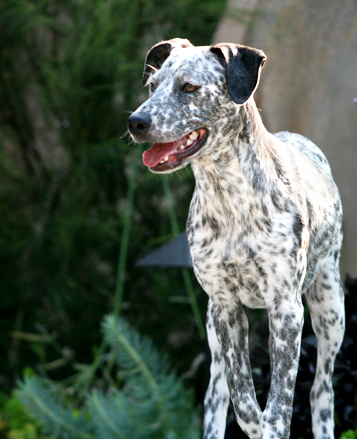
A greyster puppy

Rather than breeding similar-looking dogs in order to create a new breed with a consistent appearance, greysters are bred for the specific working traits and health needed to run short, high intensity sprint races, such as a strong cardiovascular system, high endurance and cognitive function. The foundational dogs most often used are German Shorthaired Pointers (and English Pointers), other pointers, and Greyhounds and sometimes Saluki from tightly bred sprint dog lines used for racing. Genetic studies indicate that greysters are generally 75% German Shorthair Pointer and 25% Greyhound.

Often sprint racing greysters are favored for their heat tolerance, making them popular in dryland racing events across Central Europe, where warmer temperatures impair other sled breeds. Greysters generally run 5–8 kilometres (3.1–5.0 miles) at an average speed of 30 kilometres per hour (19 mph), with a max speed of 50 kilometres per hour (31 mph). They are often popular in small kennels where their friendly nature makes them excellent companions. Like all sled dogs, they require intense physical activity; however, greysters are often known for being laid back and calm in the home.

== See also ==
- Alaskan husky
- Eurohound
