= Eurohound =

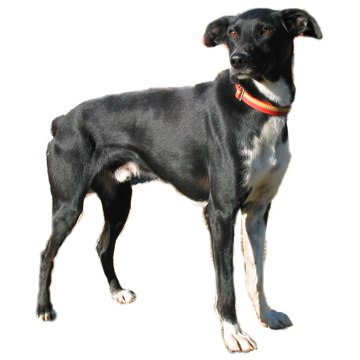
- Eurohound
- Other names: Scandinavian hound, Eurodog
- Origin: Scandinavia
- Foundation stock: Alaskan husky, pointing breeds
- Variety status: Not recognised as a breed by any major kennel club.

A Eurohound (also known as a European sled dog or Scandinavian hound) is a type of dog bred for sled dog racing. The eurohound is crossbred from the Alaskan husky and any of a number of pointing breeds ("pointers"), but most often the German Shorthair Pointer.

== History ==
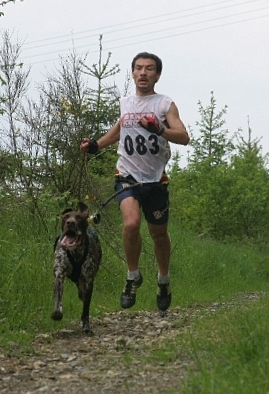
Philippe Wéry, Belgian canicross and bikejör champion competing with a eurohound

After World War II, skijor and pulka style dog sled racing gained rapidly in popularity in Norway and neighboring Scandinavian countries. These styles of racing required small, fast teams of 1-4 dogs who competed over short, hilly distances of 15–30 kilometres (9.3–18.6 mi). Required to use purebred dogs by the Norwegian Sled Dog Racing Association, the German Shorthair Pointer quickly emerged as the dog breed of choice. At the beginning of the 1970s, the "sled pointer" had emerged, a pointing dog who was bred for sledding and not hunting.

In the 1970s, "Nome-style" sled racing, which mimicked the bigger teams running long distances and overnighting in subzero temperatures seen in North American-style races, started to attract interest in Scandinavia. In 1974, the first Nome-style sled race, the Skjelbreia Sweepstakes, was hosted near Oslo. For this style of racing, Norwegian mushers began to import Alaskan huskies; popularized by mushers like Stein Havard Fjelstad and Roger Leegaard who traveled to Alaska to race in the Iditarod. However, as a performance crossbreed, the Alaskan husky could not be raced in Norway until 1985, when the Norwegian Sled Dog Racing Association removed the requirement that sled dogs be purebred.

This new ruling paved the way for Nordic-style mushers to breed their best performing dogs regardless of breed, with mushers mixing Alaskan huskies, sled pointers and even greyhounds for Nordic-style racing, while Nome-style mushers began to mix Greenland dogs with Alaskan huskies to produce a dog better suited to Scandinavia's heavy snowfall. The Nordic-style dogs gained in popularity across Europe and later North America, especially with the rise in popularity of dryland mushing, such as bikejoring and canicross.

The term "eurohound" was coined by Ivana Nolke, to distinguish the European racing dogs being imported into Alaska.

== Description ==
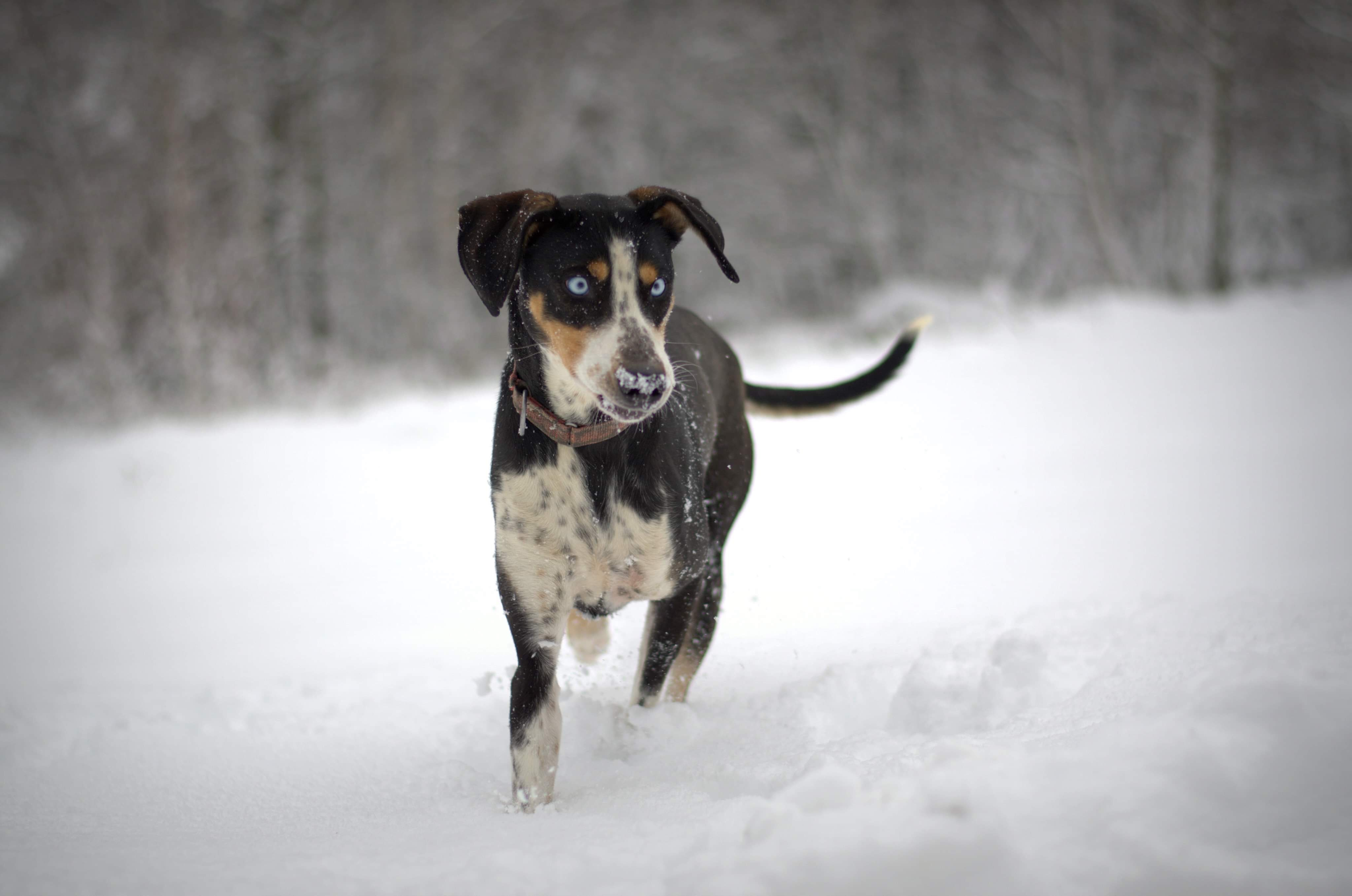
Eurohound front profile

Rather than inbreeding similar-looking dogs in order to create a new breed with a consistent appearance, eurohounds are bred for the specific working traits and health needed to run short, high intensity sprint races. The foundational dogs most often used for eurohounds are German Shorthaired Pointers (and English Pointers), other pointers, and Alaskan huskies from tightly bred sprint dog lines used for racing. Alaskan huskies are chosen for their ability to pull for extreme distances and in subzero temperatures while pointers are vigorous and energetic sprint racers. Greyhound and saluki may also be crossed with sled pointers; however; these dogs are known as Greysters. Greysters are popular for dryland racing, and limited-class snow racing.

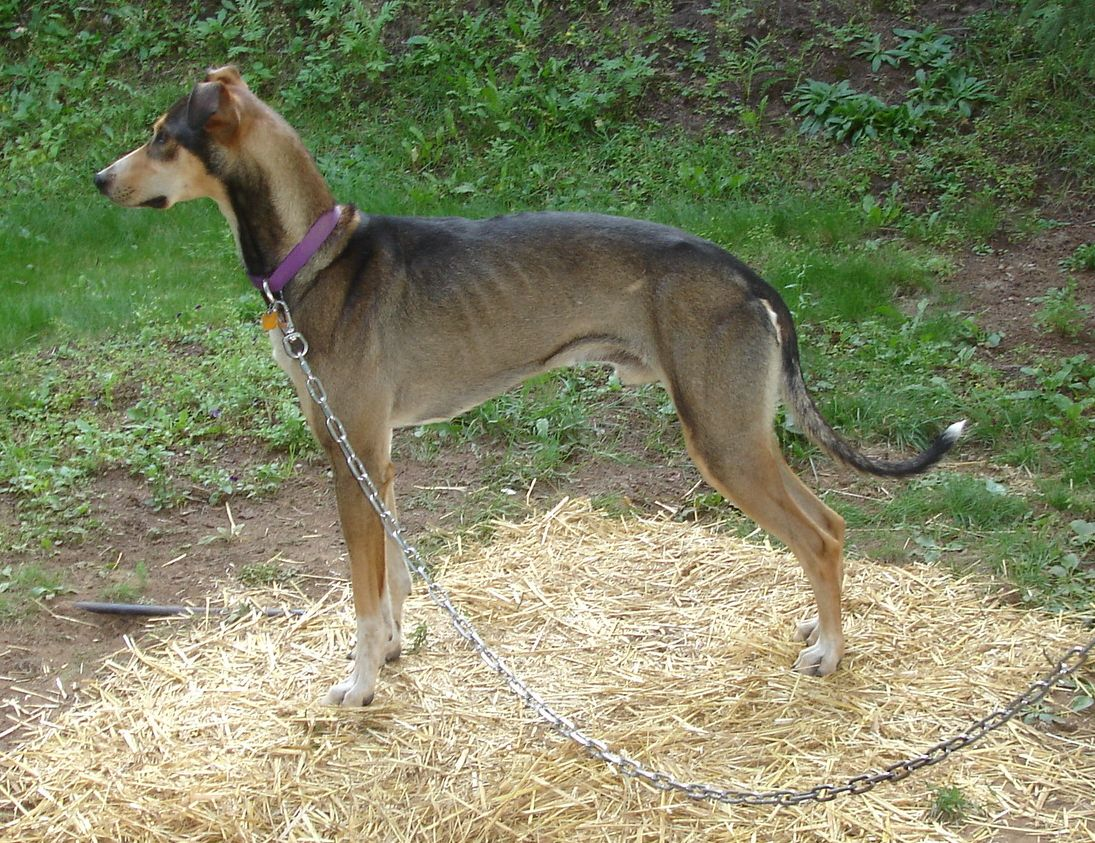
Eurohound side profile

A first-generation eurohound cross (fifty percent pointing breed, fifty percent husky) have short coats, suitable for sprint races, which doesn't involve resting or sleeping on the trail. Often sprint racing eurohounds are housed indoors or in heated barns in subzero temperatures, whereas their Alaskan husky counterparts would be immune to the cold. When the first-generation cross is crossed again with the Alaskan husky, the resulting generation can have thicker coats, suitable for longer-distance teams. Most distance mushers prefer the pointer genetics to only be 1/8 in a dog for maximum performance. This then reduces the eurohound influence, and dogs should be termed Alaskan Husky crosses or mixed hounds. The eurohound is sleeker than a husky and can hit speeds of 25 miles per hour.

Fairly common features of fifty percent crosses are half-dropped ears, black with white blazing as shown in the photo, or solid with patches of spots. Some completely spotted dogs appear as well. These dogs have a similar coat to German Shorthair Pointer and looks like standard hunting dogs. Once the percentage of pointer drops, the dogs start to look more like Alaskan huskies.
