= Canadian Eskimo Dog =

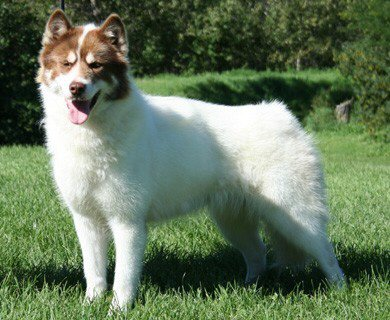

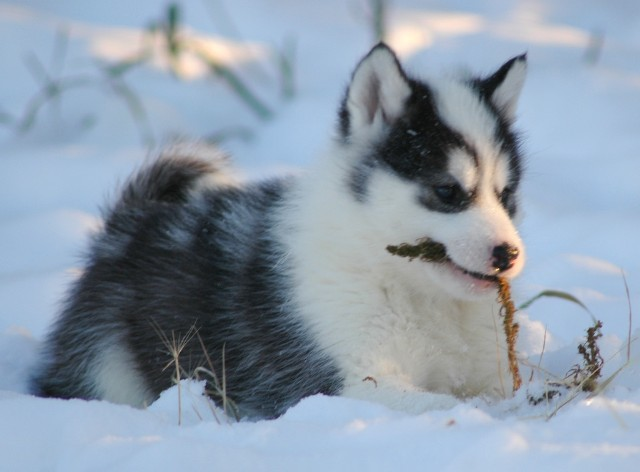
- Other names: Canadian Husky; Canadian Inuit Dog; C. familiaris borealis (archaic); Exquimaux Husky; Kingmik; Qimmiq
- Origin: Canada
Traits
| Height | Males | 58–70 cm (23–28 in) |
| | Females | 50–60 cm (20–24 in) |
| Weight | Males | 30–40 kg (66–88 lb) |
| | Females | 18–30 kg (40–66 lb) |
- Coat: thick and dense, soft undercoat, stiff guard hairs, mane of thicker fur around the neck
- Colour: any colour, with or without special markings
Kennel club standards
- Canadian Kennel Club: standard
- Fédération Cynologique Internationale: standard

The Canadian Eskimo Dog or Canadian Inuit Dog is a breed of working dog from the Arctic. Other names include qimmiq or qimmit (Inuit language word for "dog"). The Greenland Dog is considered the same breed as the Canadian Eskimo Dog since they have not yet diverged enough genetically to be considered separate breeds, despite their geographic isolation.

The breed is threatened with extinction, with a 2008 estimate of only 300 purebred dogs. Although once used as the preferred method of transportation by Inuit in the Canadian Arctic, by the 1960s traditional working dog teams became increasingly rare in the North. Contributing factors to the breed's decline include the increasing popularity of snowmobiles for transportation and the spread of infectious canine diseases. Controversy surrounds the intentional killings of a debated number of Inuit sled dogs between 1950 and 1970 by the Royal Canadian Mounted Police, as well as recent efforts to increase the breed's population.

== History ==
The first dogs arrived in the Americas 12,000 years ago, with the first humans who crossed over the Bering Strait. However, people and their dogs did not settle in the Arctic until the arrival of two groups from Siberia, the Paleo-Eskimo in c. 2400 BC and then the Thule people c. AD 1000. The Inuit dogs from Canada (Canadian Eskimo Dog) and Greenland (Greenland Dog) descended from dogs associated with the Thule people, who relied on them for transportation from Siberia.

In 2015, a study using a number of genetic markers indicated that these were both the same dog and should not be treated as separate breeds, that they maintain an indigenous heritage that predates colonization and the timing of which corresponds with the arrival of the Thule people, and that they were distinct from Siberian Huskies, Alaskan huskies and Alaskan Malamutes. The maternal mitochondrial DNA sequences of the Inuit dogs were classified as haplotype A31 that indicates a common female ancestor. This haplotype could not be found in other modern dogs; the nearest match was with the 1,000 year–old remains of a dog from Florida.

A 2018 study found that all indigenous dogs originally brought by the first wave of human migration into the Americas are now extinct. The group includes the dogs brought by Paleo-Eskimos 4,500 years ago. The Canadian Eskimo dogs, brought in a later wave by the Thule people, belong to the neighbouring group of Arctic dogs. A 2019 study confirms that these later Arctic dogs were dispersed by the Inuit across North America 2000 years ago, replacing the first wave of pre-Columbian dogs where they went.

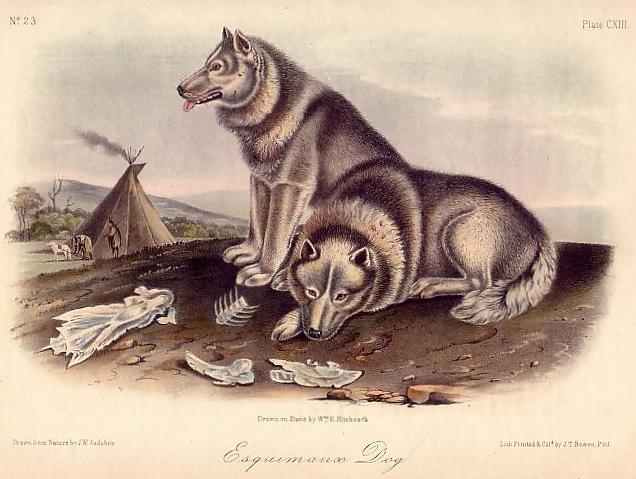
"Esquimaux dogs", engraving after John James Audubon from The Quadrupeds of North America

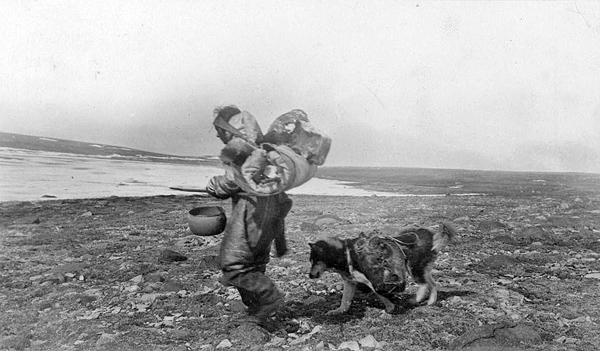
Canadian Eskimo Dog carrying gear during the Canadian Arctic Expedition

The Inuit never considered the dog as part of the animal kingdom (uumajuit), but merely as a tool for human existence. It was, and still is (to a very limited extent), used by the Canadian Inuit as multi-purpose dogs, often put to work hunting seals and other Arctic game, and hauling supplies and people. Explorers noted that the dogs were capable of tracking a seal hole from a great distance, and were occasionally used to hunt polar bears. The dogs were reported to be so enthusiastic in hunting bears that, sometimes, their handlers shouted "nanuq" (Inuktitut name for the bear) to encourage them when pulling sledges.

The dogs however would not pursue wolves, and would howl fearfully at their approach. Frozen dog urine was used by Inuit as a medicine, and their fur was more prized than that of wolves, due to its greater resistance to wear. In times of famine, the dogs would be used as an emergency food source. Though once assumed to be a tamed wolf or wolf-dog hybrid by explorers, including Charles Darwin due to similarities in appearance and vocalisations, genetic testing has shown that the Eskimo dog has no recent wolf ancestry.

The breed is currently threatened with extinction. In the 19th century and early 20th century, this breed was still in demand for polar expeditions, and approximately 20,000 dogs lived in the Canadian Arctic in the 1920s. However, the breed had declined significantly by the 1960s. The breed had once been accepted for showing by both the American Kennel Club and the Canadian Kennel Club; however, in 1959 the AKC dropped the breed from its registry because of extremely low numbers. The Canadian Eskimo Dog and Greenland Dog are sometimes considered the same breed by authorities, although the Greenland Dog can be criticized for lacking any proper breeding program, questioning its validity as a pure breed.

The Eskimo Dog Research Foundation was established in 1972 with funding from the Canadian Government and the Northwest Territories Government and support from the Canadian Kennel Club. It purchased dogs from the small (about 200 dogs) population remaining in the Canadian Arctic from remote Inuit camps on Baffin Island, Boothia Peninsula, and Melville Peninsula and began breeding to increase numbers.

Brian Ladoon also bought dogs in the 1970s from the northern communities of Canada and started breeding after being given the mission of saving them by Bishop Omer Alfred Robidoux of the Roman Catholic Diocese of Churchill-Baie d'Hudson. He switched from Malamutes and Huskies to the CEDs, and after breeding for 30 years still has the largest genetic stock colony of Canadian Eskimo Dogs in the world. The modern breed originated from a relatively high number of founders, thus ensuring sufficient genetic variability to avoid inbreeding.

The Canadian Eskimo Dog is currently used in sled dog teams that entertain tourists and for commercial polar bear hunting. By law, polar bear hunting in the Northwest Territories and Nunavut must be conducted by dog team or on foot. The requirement is partly for safety reasons; the working dogs can better sense when a polar bear is around, whereas the sound of a snowmobile motor masks any sign of a polar bear. On May 1, 2000, the Canadian territory of Nunavut officially adopted the "Canadian Inuit Dog" as the animal symbol of the territory, thus sealing the name of their traditional dog (qimmiq) in the Inuktitut language.

The annual long-distance sled dog race Ivakkak was launched in 2001 to promote traditional dogsledding and to revive the Canadian Eskimo Dog. Only Inuit mushers and purebred Canadian Inuit Dogs are eligible to participate in Ivakkak.

=== RCMP dog killings ===
Between 1950 and 1970, the Royal Canadian Mounted Police slaughtered Inuit sled dogs. Estimates of the number of dogs killed range from 1,200 to 20,000. In some communities, elders have alleged that this destruction was conducted in order to intimidate the Inuit and to intentionally disrupt their way of life. In response to these allegations, in 2005 the RCMP conducted an internal investigation on the killings. Its report concluded that dogs were indeed killed, but for public health purposes – to remove sick, dangerous, and suffering animals. However, the report also acknowledged that the RCMP rarely followed ordinances that required dogs to first be captured and owners to be notified before killings, that owners had no recourse against unreasonable killings, and that the justification for killings were not always explained to the Inuit. The report denies that any dogs were killed as part of a plot against the Inuit. The Qikiqtani Inuit Association denounced the report as "biased, flawed and incomplete." The association later commissioned its own report, which criticized the RCMP's killing of dogs heavily while still finding no deliberate conspiracy against the Inuit.

In August of 2019, Canadian Minister of Crown–Indigenous Relations Carolyn Bennett made a wide-ranging apology to the Inuit of Baffin Island, including for the slaughter and forced decline of Inuit dogs. This was the third of a series of apologies made for the historic abuse, mistreatment, and forced relocation of the Inuit, and came with a CA$20 million donation to the Qikiqtani Inuit Association, of which $700,000 will go towards the annual Nunavut Quest dog sled race for 7 years.

== Description ==
=== Appearance ===
The Canadian Eskimo Dog should always be powerfully built, athletic, and imposing in appearance. It should be of "powerful physique giving the impression that he is not built for speed but rather for hard work." As is typical of spitz breeds, it has erect, triangular ears, and a heavily feathered tail that is carried over its back. Males should be distinctly more masculine than females, who are finer boned, smaller, and often have a slightly shorter coat.

Its superficial similarity to wolves was often noted by explorers during the Coppermine Expedition of 1819–1822. They noted that the ears of the Eskimo dogs they encountered were similar to those of American wolves, and their forelegs lacked the black mark above the wrist characteristic of European wolves. The most sure way to distinguish the two species was said to be through the length and posture of the tail, which was shorter and more curved in the dog.

==== Coat and colour ====
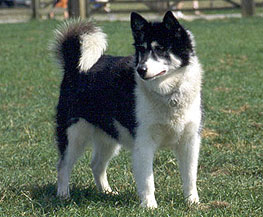

The coat is very thick and dense, with a soft undercoat and stiff, coarse guard hairs. The Eskimo Dog has a mane of thick fur around its neck, which is quite impressive in the males and adds an illusion of additional size. This mane is smaller in females. Eskimo Dogs can be almost any colour, and no one colour or colour pattern should dominate. Solid white dogs are often seen, as well as white dogs with patches of another colour on the head or both body and head. Solid silver or black coloured dogs are common as well. Many of the solid coloured dogs have white mask-like markings on the face, sometimes with spots over the eyes. Others might have white socks and nose stripes with no eye spots or mask.

==== Size ====
The size of Canadian Eskimo dogs depends on their sex. Males weigh 30–40 kg (66–88 lb) and stand 58–70 cm (23–28 in) at the shoulder. Females weigh 18–30 kg (40–66 lb) and stand 50–60 cm (20–24 in).

=== Temperament ===
The Canadian Eskimo Dog's temperament reflects its original work and environment. It is loyal, tough, brave, intelligent, and alert. It is affectionate and gentle, and develops a deep bond with its owner and is intensely loyal. When used as sled dogs, they were often required to forage and hunt for their own food. Consequently, many Canadian Eskimo Dogs have stronger prey drive than some other breeds. Owing to their original environment, they take pure delight in cold weather, often preferring to sleep outside in winter. Like most spitz breeds they can be very vocal.

== Care and training ==
Historically, Inuit would put their dogs to the harness as soon as they could walk, and would acquire the habit of pulling sledges in their attempts to break free. At the age of two months, the pups would be placed with adult dogs. Sometimes, ten pups would be put under the lead of an older animal, coupled with frequent beatings from their masters, which would educate the pups.
