= Sled dog =

Working dog

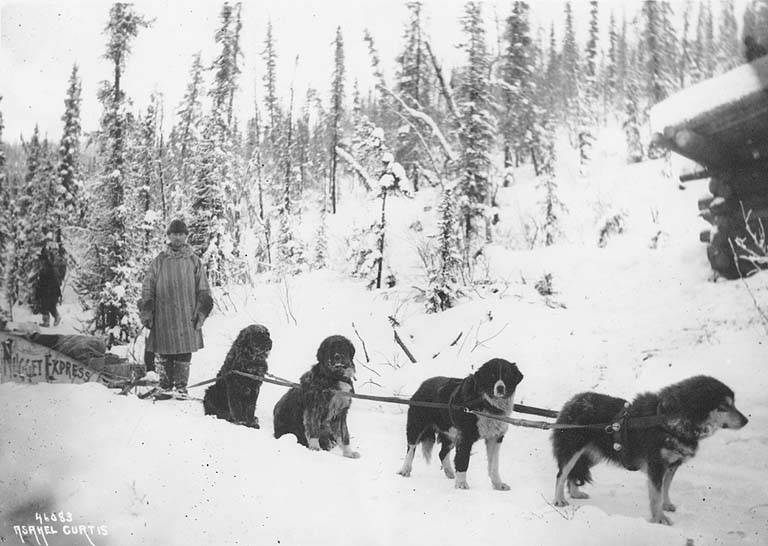
Mail service established in 1898 covered all creeks adjacent to Dawson City

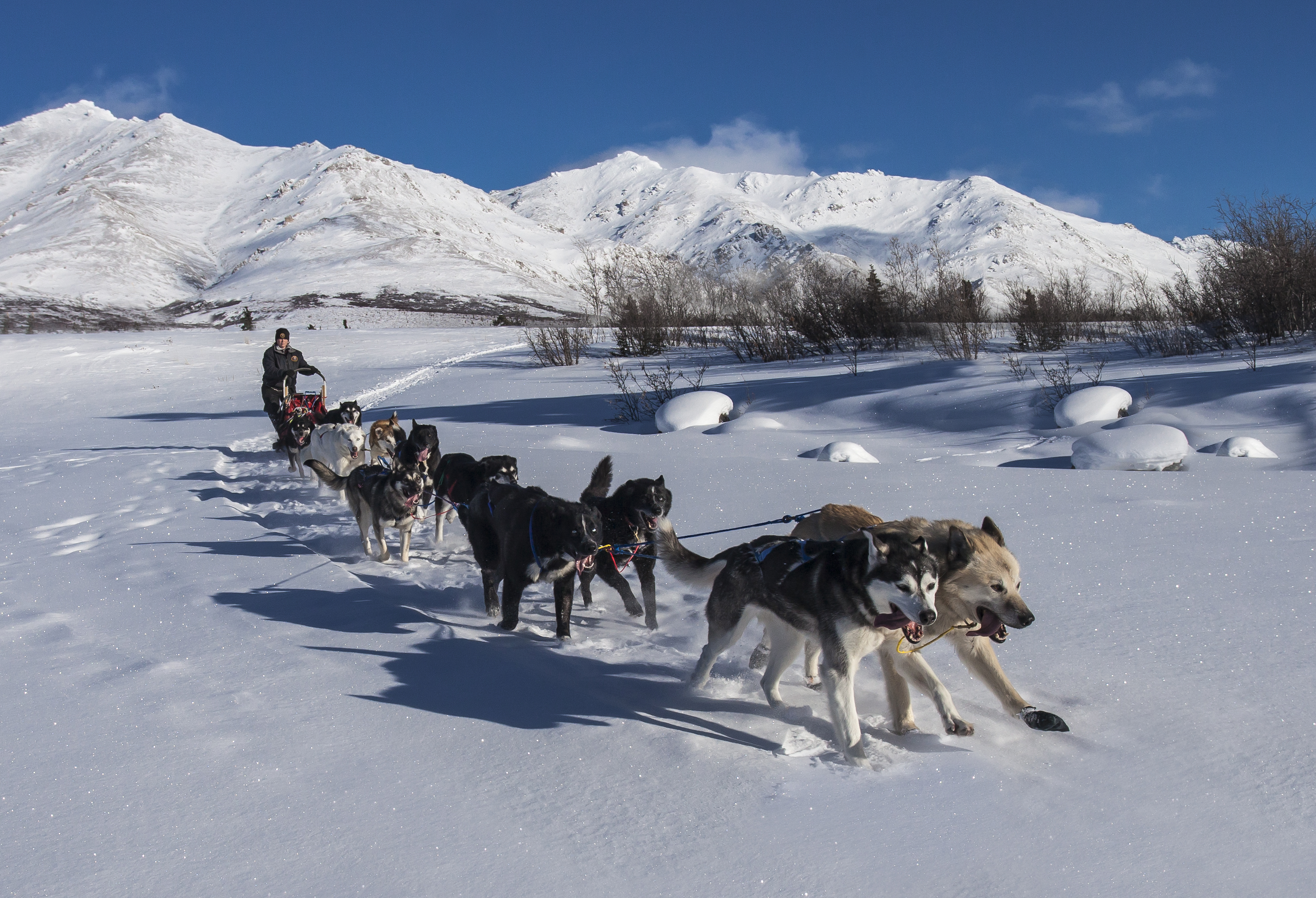
A sled dog team of 11 in Denali National Park and Preserve

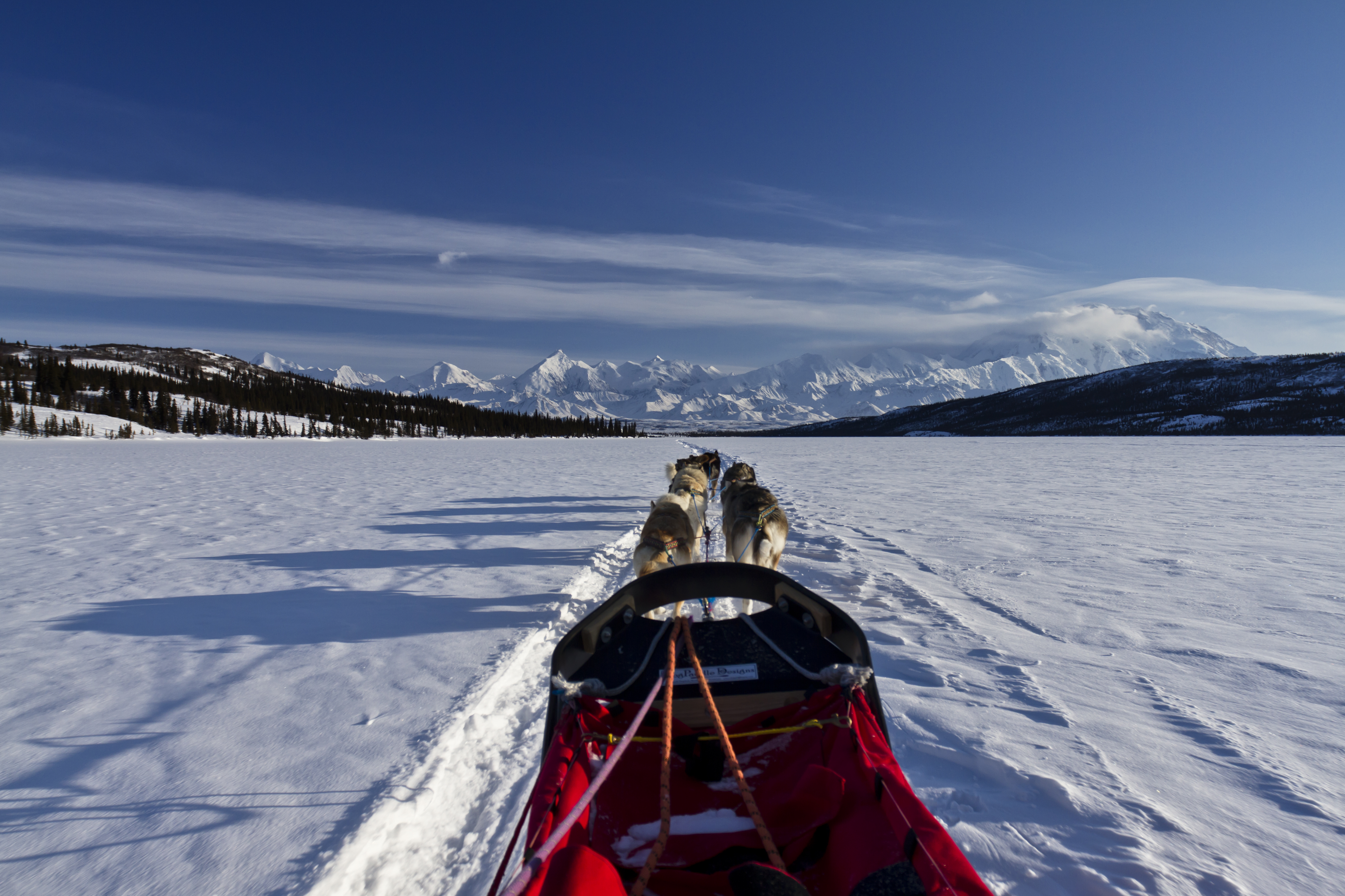
Point of view of a park ranger driving a six-dog team on Wonder Lake

A sled dog is a dog trained and used to pull a land vehicle in harness, most commonly a sled over snow.

Sled dogs have been used in the Arctic for at least 8,000 years and, along with watercraft, were the only transportation in Arctic areas until the introduction of semi-trailer trucks, snowmobiles and airplanes in the 20th century, hauling supplies in areas that were inaccessible by other methods. They were used with varying success in the explorations of both poles, as well as during the Alaskan gold rush. Sled dog teams delivered mail to rural communities in Alaska, Yukon, Northwest Territories and Nunavut. Sled dogs today are still used by some rural communities, especially in areas of Russia, Canada, and Alaska as well as much of Greenland. They are used for recreational purposes and racing events, such as the Iditarod Trail and the Yukon Quest.

== History ==
Sled dogs are used in countries and regions such as Canada, Greenland, Siberia, Russia, Norway, Sweden, and Alaska.

=== Russia ===
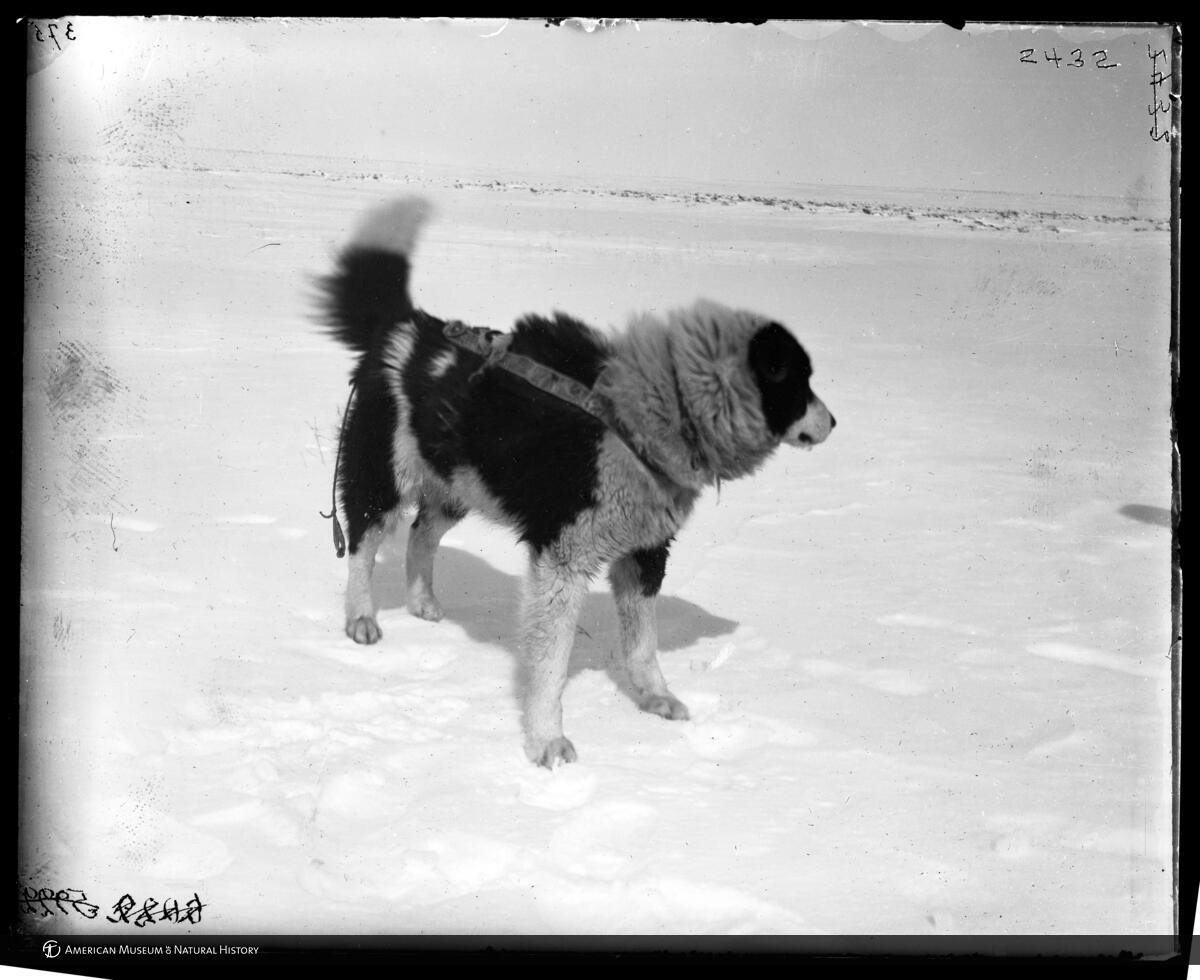
Sled dog wearing harness during the Jesup Expedition in Siberia

A 2017 study showed that 9,000 years ago, the domestic dog was present at what is now Zhokhov Island, northeastern Siberia, which at that time was connected to the mainland. The dogs were selectively bred as either sled dogs or hunting dogs, implying that a sled dog standard and a hunting dog standard co-existed. The optimal maximum size for a sled dog is 20–25 kg (44–55 lb) based on thermo-regulation, and the ancient sled dogs were between 16 and 25 kg (35 and 55 lb). The same standard has been found in the remains of sled dogs from this region 2,000 years ago and in the modern Siberian Husky breed standard. Other dogs were more massive at 30 kg (66 lb) and appear to be dogs that had been crossed with wolves and used for polar bear hunting. At death, the heads of the dogs had been carefully separated from their bodies by humans. Anthropologists speculated that this might have been for ceremonial reasons.

The Kungur Chronicle and the Remezov Chronicle, created at the end of the 16th century and 1703 respectively, tells about the people living along Siberian rivers, whose primary means of transport was riding on reindeer or dogs. In these documents, the rivers Olenyok, Yana, Indigirka and Kolyma were called "dog rivers", as they were rich in fish for the dogs to eat. Rivers with no fish or not enough to feed the dogs were called "deer rivers," as reindeer were then used for transportation.

From the 1940s to the 1990s, Russian dog sled numbers were in decline. The breed population reached an all-time low of 3,000 in 1998 before revival efforts took off. Reasons for their decline include

- introduction of mechanization in the Arctic
- reduced capacity to keep dogs, especially with reduced fish catches and collectivization of farming and reindeer herding.
- decline of fur hunting.

=== Scandinavia ===
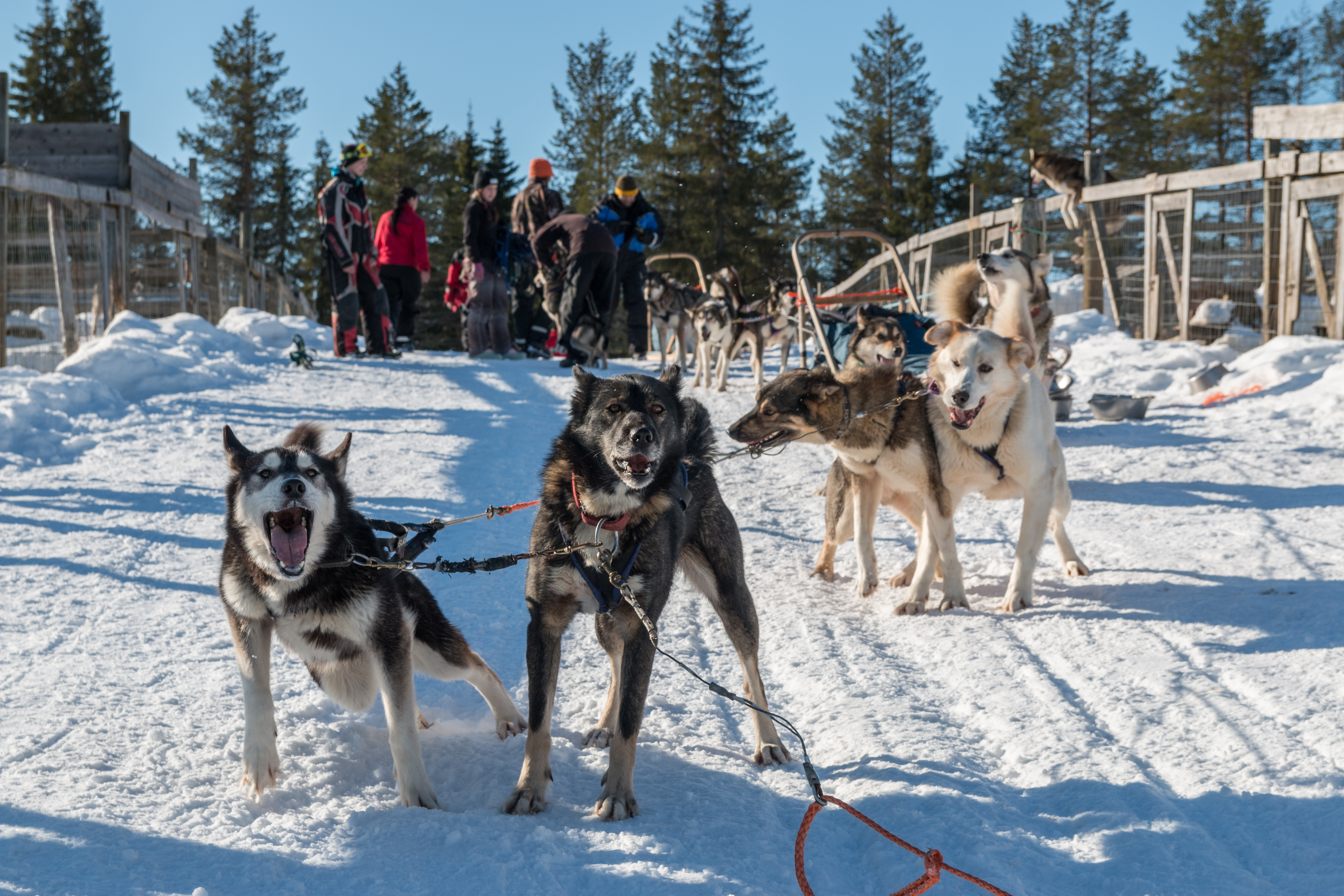
Huskies ready to ride at the husky farm in Kuusamo, Finland

After World War II, skijor and pulka style dog sled racing gained rapidly in popularity in Norway and neighboring Scandinavian countries. These styles of racing required small, fast teams of 1–4 dogs who competed over short, hilly distances of 15–30 km (10–20 mi). Required to use purebred dogs by the Norwegian Sled Dog Racing Association, the German Shorthair Pointer quickly emerged as the dog breed of choice. At the beginning of the 1970s, the "sled pointer" had emerged, a pointing dog who was bred exclusively for sledding and not hunting. During the 1970s, "Nome-style" sled racing, which mimicked the big sled dog teams running long distances and overnighting in subzero temperatures seen in North American-style races, started to attract interest in Scandinavia. In 1974, the first Nome-style sled race, the Skjelbreia Sweepstakes, was hosted near Oslo. For this style of racing, Norwegian mushers began to import Alaskan huskies; popularized by mushers like Stein Havard Fjestad and Roger Leegaard who traveled to Alaska to race in the Iditarod. However, as a performance crossbreed, the Alaskan husky could not be legally raced in Norway until 1985, when the Norwegian Sled Dog Racing Association removed the requirement that sled dogs be purebred.

This new ruling also paved the way for Nordic-style mushers to breed their best performing dogs regardless of breed, with mushers mixing Alaskan husky and German Shorthair Pointer to produce the Eurohound as well as Greyhound with German Shorthair Pointer to produce the Greyster. These Nordic-style crossbreeds gained in popularity across Europe and later North America, especially with the rise in popularity of dryland mushing, such as bikejoring and canicross.

Sled dogs and husky safaris are not native to Sápmi (Lapland) and Finland and are considered a major nuisance by reindeer herders as they directly impact their livelihoods. These and glass-domed "iglus" have been appropriated from other cultures by the tourist industry in the 1980s and falsely portrayed as being part of the Sámi and Finnish cultures.

=== Greenland ===
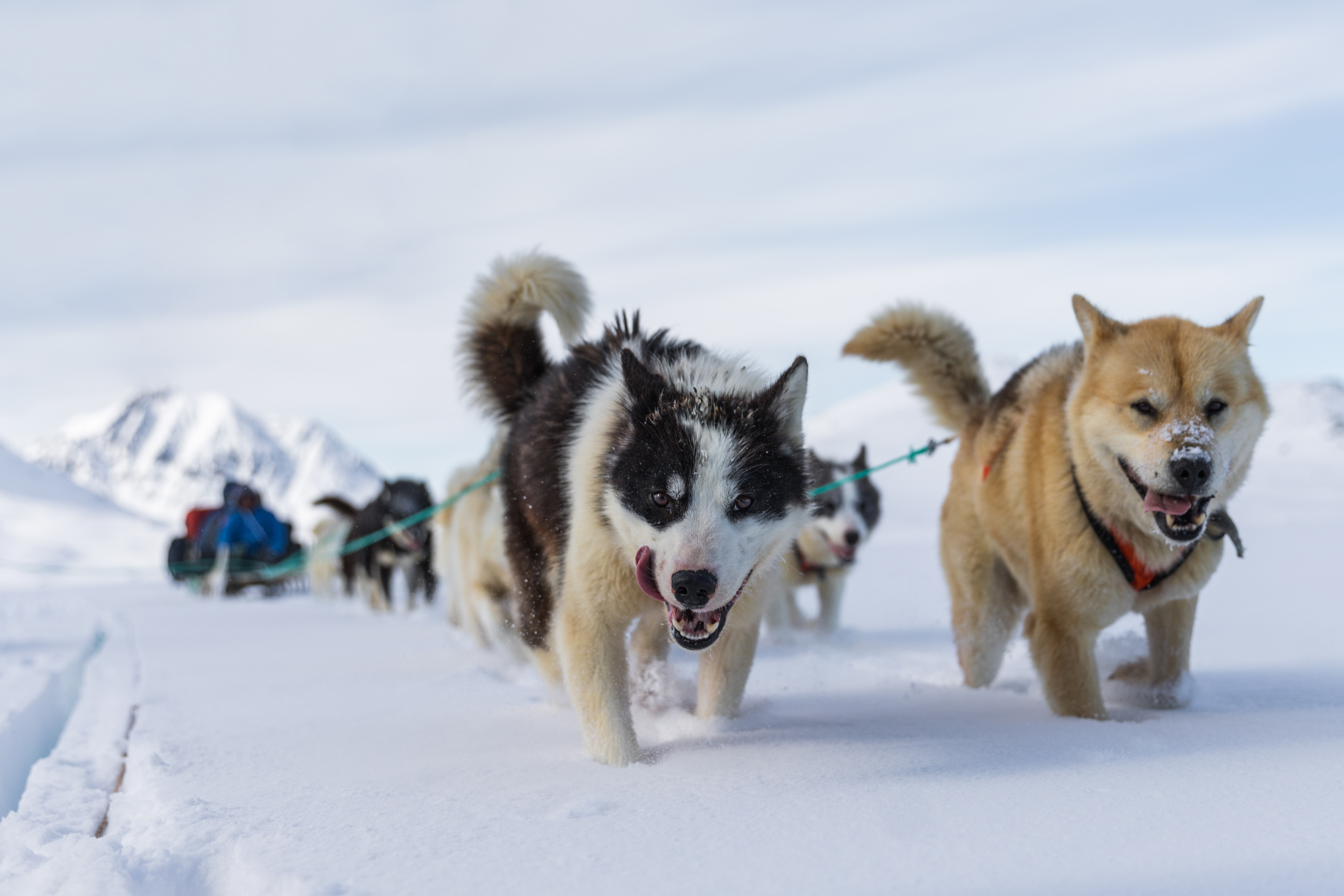
Dog sledding is still commonly used for transportation in parts of Greenland

The Greenlandic Inuit have a very long history of using sled dogs and they are still widely used today. As of 2010, some 18,000 Greenland Dogs were kept in western Greenland north of the Arctic Circle and in eastern Greenland (because of the effort of maintaining the purity of this culturally important breed, they are the only dogs allowed in these regions) and about half of these were in active use as sled dogs by hunters and fishers. As a result of reduced sea ice (limiting their area of use), increasing use of snowmobiles, increasing dog food prices and disease among some local dog populations, the number has been gradually falling in decades and by 2016 there were 15,000 Greenland dogs. A number of projects have been initiated in an attempt of ensuring that Greenland's dog sledding culture, knowledge and use are not lost.

The Sirius Patrol, a special forces unit in the Danish military, enforces the sovereignty of the remote unpopulated northeast (essentially equalling the Northeast Greenland National Park) and conduct long-range dog sled patrolling, which also record all sighted wildlife. The patrols averaged 14,876 km (9,244 mi) per year during 1978–1998. By 1996, the Greenland wolf had re-populated eastern Greenland from the National Park in the northeast through following these dog-sled patrols over distances of up to 560 km (350 mi). By 2002, however, the east Greenland population had gone entirely extinct again, and any wolves seen in eastern Greenland today are classified as vagrants.

=== North America ===
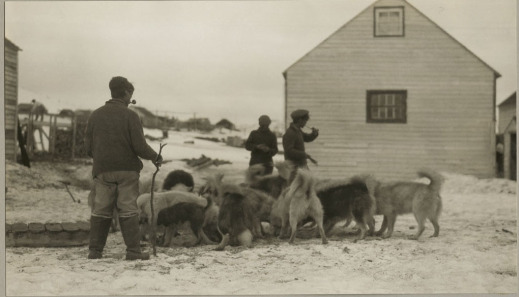
Labrador huskies being fed by Inuit

In 2019, a study found that those dogs brought initially into the North American Arctic from northeastern Siberia were later replaced by dogs accompanying the Inuit during their expansion beginning 2,000 years ago. These Inuit dogs were more genetically diverse and more morphologically divergent when compared with the earlier dogs. Today, Arctic sledge dogs are the last descendants in the Americas of this pre-European dog lineage.

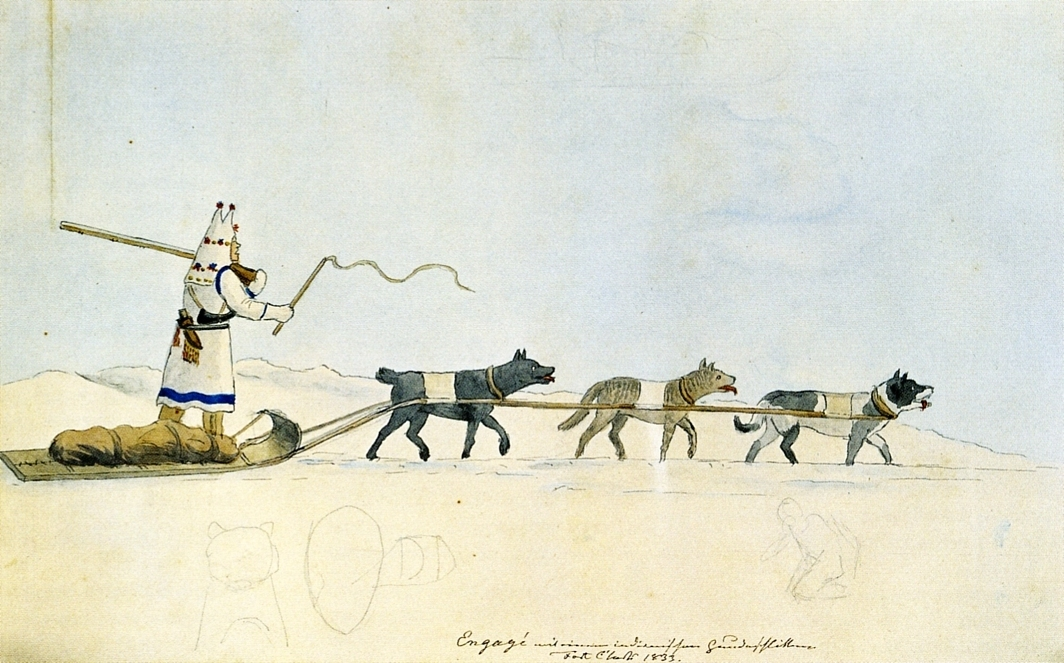
A Native American sled dog team of three near Fort Clark, North Dakota, sketched in 1833

Historical references of the dogs and dog harnesses that were used by Native American cultures date back to before European contact. The use of dogs as draft animals was widespread in North America. There were two main kinds of sled dogs; one kind was kept by coastal cultures, and the other kind was kept by interior cultures such as the Athabascan Indians. These interior dogs formed the basis of the Alaskan husky. Russian traders following the Yukon River inland in the mid-1800s acquired sled dogs from the interior villages along the river. The dogs of this area were reputed to be stronger and better at hauling heavy loads than the native Russian sled dogs.

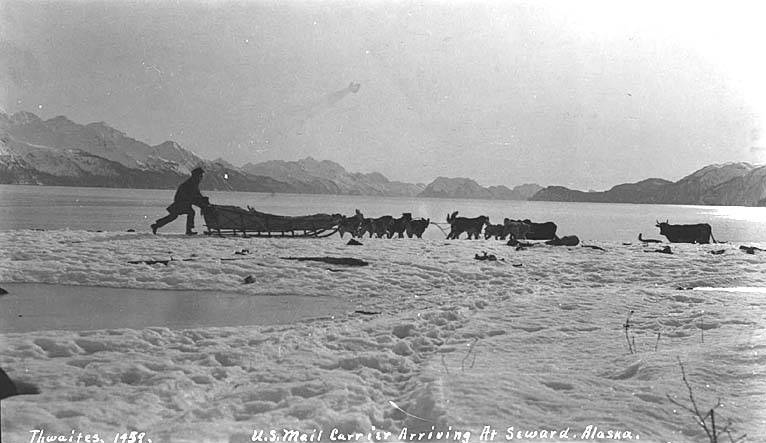
US mail carrier and dog sled team arriving at Seward, c. 1912

The Alaskan Gold Rush brought renewed interest in the use of sled dogs as transportation. Most gold camps were accessible only by dogsled in the winter. "Everything that moved during the frozen season moved by dog team; prospectors, trappers, doctors, mail, commerce, trade, freighting of supplies … if it needed to move in winter, it was moved by sled dogs." This, along with the dogs' use in the exploration of the poles, led to the late 1800s and early 1900s being nicknamed the "Era of the Sled Dog".

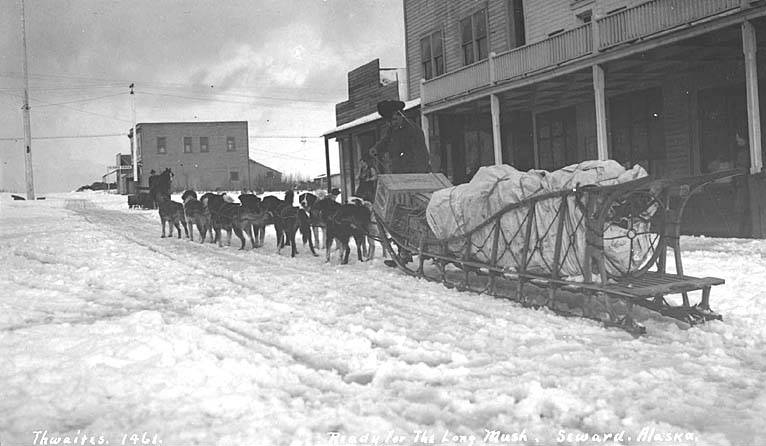
Caption reads "Ready for The Long Mush, Seward, Alaska" (click photo for further information) c. 1914

Sled dogs were used to deliver the mail in Alaska during the late 1800s and early 1900s. Alaskan Malamutes were the favored breed, with teams averaging eight to ten dogs. Dogs were capable of delivering mail in conditions that would stop boats, trains, and horses. Each team hauled between 230 and 320 kg (500 and 700 lb) of mail. The mail was stored in waterproofed bags to protect it from the snow. By 1901, dog trails had been established along the entirety of the Yukon River. Mail delivery by dog sled came to an end in 1963 when the last mail carrier to use a dog sled, Chester Noongwook of Savoonga, retired. He was honored by the US Postal Service in a ceremony on St. Lawrence Island in the Bering Sea.

Airplanes took over Alaskan mail delivery in the 1920s and 1930s. In 1924, Carl Ben Eielson flew the first Alaskan airmail delivery. Dog sleds were used to patrol western Alaska during World War II. Highways and trucking in the 40s and 50s, and the snowmachine in the 50s and 60s, contributed to the decline of the working sled dog.

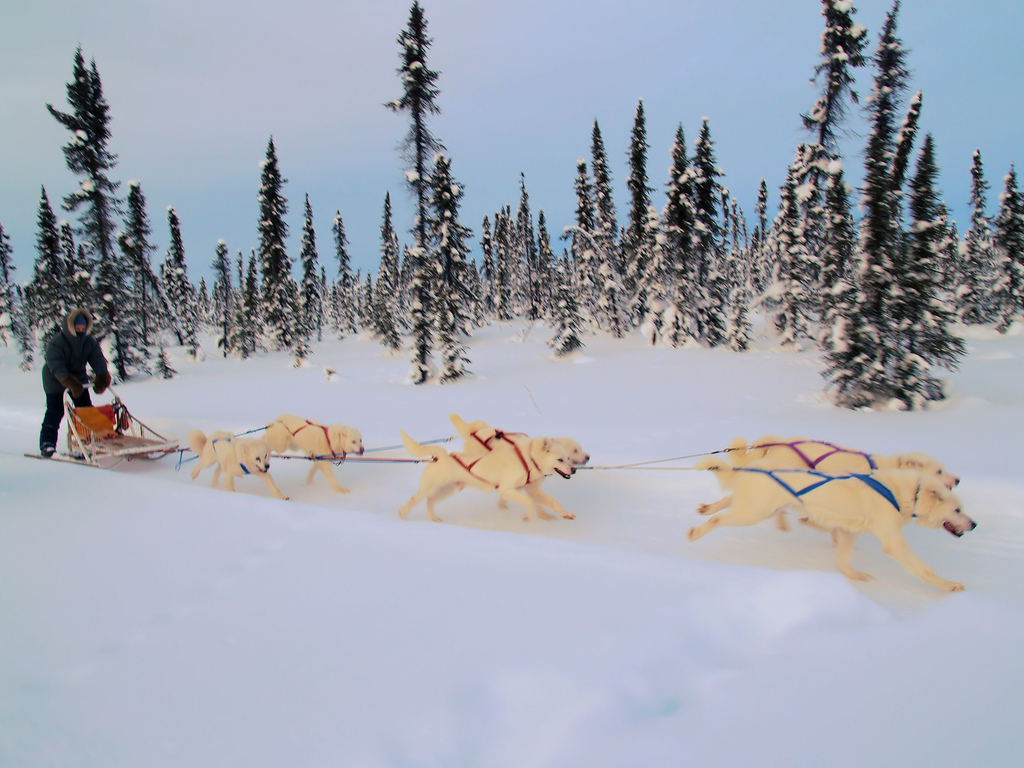
A sled dog team of six white huskies hiking in Inuvik, Canada

Recreational mushing came into place to maintain the tradition of dog mushing. The desire for larger, stronger, load-pulling dogs changed to one for faster dogs with high endurance used in racing, which caused the dogs to become lighter than they were historically. Americans and others living in Alaska then began to import sled dogs from the native tribes of Siberia (which would later evolve and become the Siberian Husky breed) to increase the speed of their own dogs, presenting "a direct contrast to the idea that Russian traders sought heavier draft-type sled dogs from the Interior regions of Alaska and the Yukon less than a century earlier to increase the hauling capacity of their lighter sled dogs."

Outside of Alaska, dog-drawn carts were used to haul peddler's wares in cities like New York.

==== Alaska and the Iditarod ====
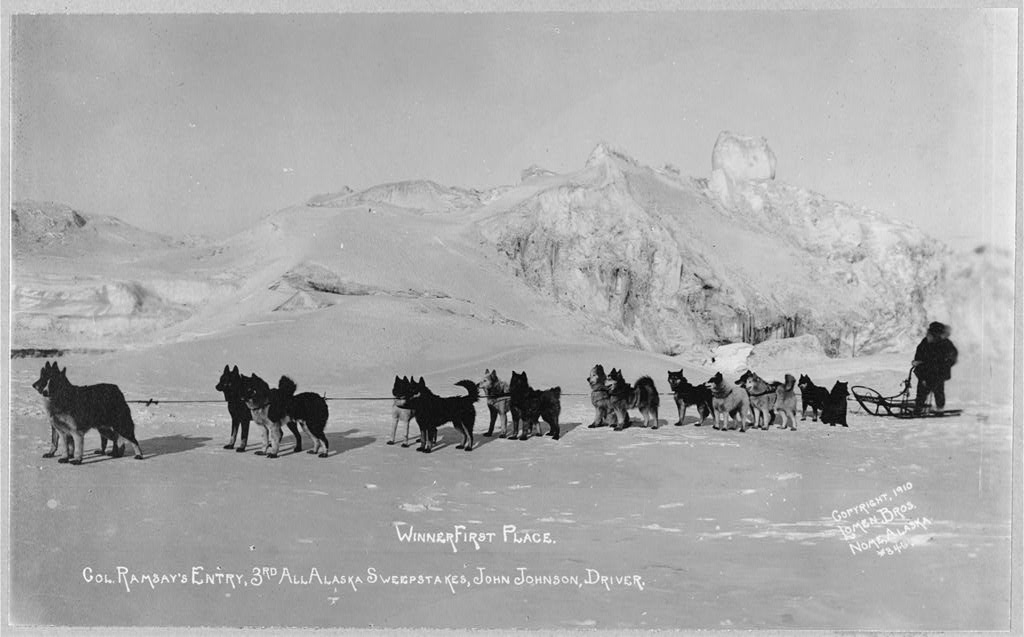
Col. Ramsay's entry, winning dog sled team of the 3rd All Alaska Sweepstakes, John Johnson, driver ~ c. 1910

In 1925, a massive diphtheria outbreak crippled Nome, Alaska. There was no serum in Nome to treat the people infected by the disease. There was serum in Nenana, but the town was more than 1,000 km (600 mi) away, and inaccessible except by dog sled. A dog sled relay was set up by the villages between Nenana and Nome, and 20 teams worked together to relay the serum to Nome. The serum reached Nome in six days.

The Iditarod Trail was established on the path between these two towns. It was known as the Iditarod Trail because, at the time, Iditarod was the largest town on the trail. During the 1940s, the trail fell into disuse. However, in 1967, Dorothy Page, who was conducting Alaska's centennial celebration, ordered 14 km (9 mi) of the trail to be cleared for a dog sled race. In 1972, the US Army performed a survey of the trail, and in 1973 the Iditarod was established by Joe Redington Sr. The race was won by Dick Wilmarth, who took three weeks to complete the race.

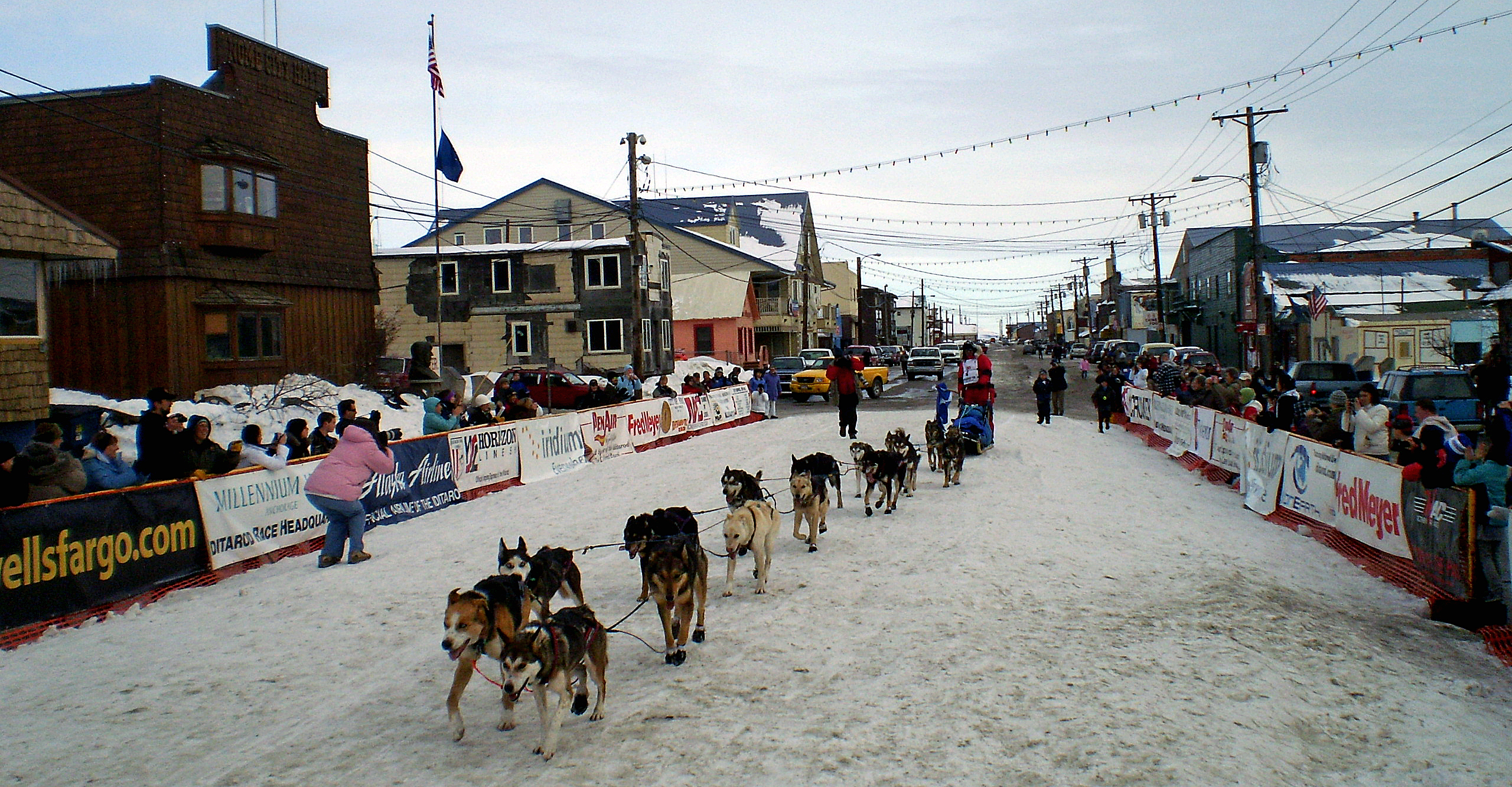
Musher and dogs enter Iditarod finish chute

The modern Iditarod is a 1,800 km (1,100 mi) endurance sled dog race. It usually lasts for ten to eleven days, weather permitting. It begins with a ceremonial start in Anchorage, Alaska on the morning of the first Saturday in March, with mushers running 32 km (20 mi) to Eagle River along the Alaskan Highway, giving spectators a chance to see the dogs and the mushers. The teams are then loaded onto trucks and driven 48 km (30 mi) to Wasilla for the official race start in the afternoon. The race ends when the last musher either drops out of the race or crosses the finish line in Nome. The winner of the race receives a prize of US$50,000. It has been billed as the "World Series of mushing events" and "The Last Great Race on Earth".

=== Antarctica ===
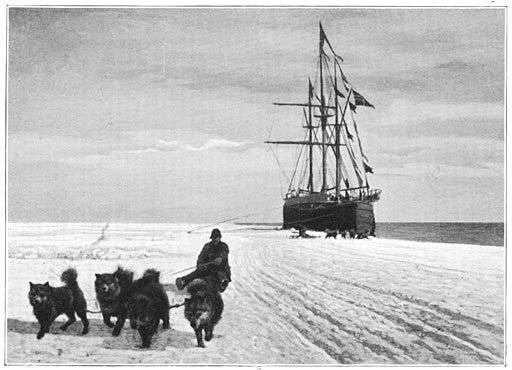
Roald Amundsen's Antarctic expedition

The first Arctic explorers were men with sled dogs. Due to the success of using sled dogs in the Arctic, it was thought they would be helpful in the Antarctic exploration as well, and many explorers made attempts to use them. Sled dogs were used until 1992, when they were banned from Antarctica by the Protocol on Environmental Protection to the Antarctic Treaty as part of a larger ban on foreign species in order to protect the antarctic ecosystem.

Carsten Borchgrevink used either Sámi sled dogs or Samoyeds with Finnish handlers in Antarctica during his Southern Cross Expedition (1898–1900), but it was much colder than expected at Cape Adare. The dogs were used to working on snow, not on ice, in much milder temperatures. The dogs were also inadequately fed, and eventually all of the dogs died.

Erich von Drygalski used Kamchatka sled dogs in his 1901–1903 expedition, and fared much better because his dogs were used to the cold and he hired an experienced dog handler. His dogs were allowed to breed freely and many had to be shot because there was no room on the ship to take them home. Many that were not shot were left behind on the Kerguelen Islands.

Otto Nordenskjöld intended to use Greenland Dogs in his 1901–1904 expedition, but all but four of his huskies died on the journey south. He picked up a mixed breed in the Falklands, but after his arrival in the Antarctic, these were all hunted down and killed by his four surviving huskies hunting as a pack because of dog handler Ole Jonassen's failure to tether the dogs. These huskies were later able to pull 265 kg (584 lb) over 29 km (18 mi) in three and a half hours.

Robert Falcon Scott brought twenty Samoyeds with him during his 1902 journey. The dogs struggled under the conditions Scott placed them in, with four dogs pulling heavily loaded sleds through 45 cm (18 in) of snow with bleeding feet. Scott blamed their failure on rotten dried fish. In 1910, Scott returned with 33 Sakhalin huskies but noted that they performed poorly in deep snow and their docked tails prevented them from curling up to keep warm.

Douglas Mawson and Xavier Mertz were part of the Far Eastern Party, a three-man sledging team with Lieutenant B.E.S. Ninnis, to survey King George V Land, Antarctica. On 14 December 1912, Ninnis fell through a snow-covered crevasse along with most of the party's rations, and was never seen again. Their meagre provisions forced them to eat their remaining dogs on their 507 km (315 mi) return journey. Their meat was tough, stringy and without a vestige of fat. Each animal yielded very little, and the major part was fed to the surviving dogs, which ate the meat, skin and bones until nothing remained.

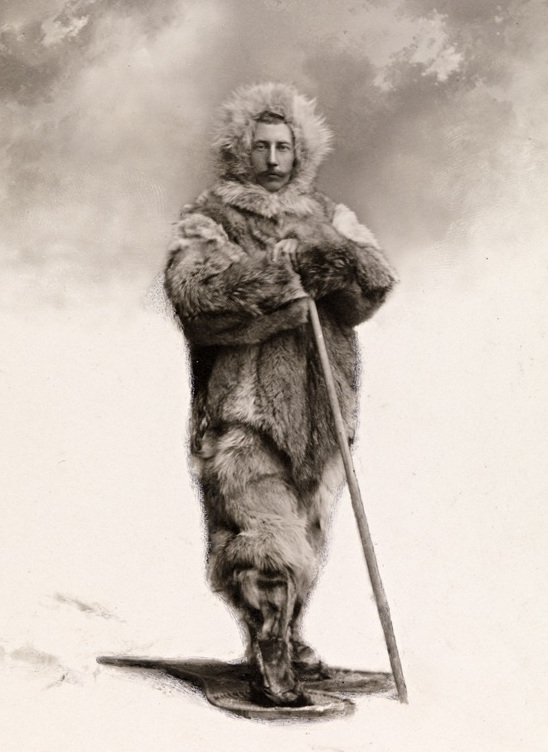
Roald Amundsen, whose Antarctic expedition was planned around 97 sled dogs

The men also ate the dog's brains and livers. Unfortunately eating the liver of sled dogs produces the condition hypervitaminosis A because canines have a much higher tolerance for vitamin A than humans do. Mertz suffered a quick deterioration. He developed stomach pains and became incapacitated and incoherent. On 7 January 1913, Mertz died. Mawson continued alone, eventually making it back to camp alive.

Roald Amundsen's expedition was planned around 97 Esquimaux dogs (possibly Canadian Eskimo Dogs, Greenland Dogs or both). On his first try, two of his dogs froze to death in the −56 °C (−69 °F) temperatures. He tried a second time and was successful. Amundsen was covering 27 km (17 mi) a day, with stops every 5 km (3 mi) to build a cairn to mark the trail. He had 55 dogs with him, which he culled until he had 14 left when he returned from the pole. On the return trip, a man skied ahead of the dogs and hid meat in the cairns to encourage them to run.

== Sled dog breeds ==
The original sled dogs were chosen for size, strength and stamina, but modern dogs are bred for speed and endurance Most sled dogs weigh around 25 kg (55 lb), but they can weigh as little as 16 kg (35 lb), and can exceed 32 kg (71 lb). Sled dogs have a very efficient gait, and "mushers strive for a well balanced dog team that matches all dogs for both size (approximately the same) and gait (the walking, trotting or running speeds of the dogs as well as the 'transition speed' where a dog will switch from one gait to another) so that the entire dog team moves in a similar fashion which increases overall team efficiency." They can run up to 45 km/h (28 mph). Because of this, sled dogs have very tough, webbed feet with closely spaced toes. Their webbed feet act as snow shoes.

Sled dog breeds can typically be divided into further sub-types:

- sprint dogs, bred to pull sleds quickly
- freight dogs, bred to pull massive weights
- long distance dogs, bred to travel hundreds or even thousands of kilometres
- aboriginal multipurpose sled dogs, such as Russian laikas who pull sleds as well as herd reindeer and hunt game.

A dog's fur depends on its use. Freight dogs should have dense, warm coats to hold heat in, and sprint dogs have short coats that let heat out. Most sled dogs have a double coat, with the outer coat keeping snow away from the body, and a waterproof inner coat for insulation. In warm weather, dogs may have problems regulating their body temperature and may overheat. Their tails serve to protect their nose and feet from freezing when the dog is curled up to sleep. They also have a unique arrangement of blood vessels in their legs to help protect against frostbite.

Appetite is a big part of choosing sled dogs; picky dogs off trail may be pickier on the trail. They are fed high-fat diets, historically sled dogs ate a diet of oily salmon or blubbery sea mammals; however, dwindling salmon populations have resulted in mushers turning to alternate food sources including commercial dog food to feed their dogs. Sled dogs also must not be overly aggressive with other dogs. They also need a lot of exercise.

Rising temperatures due to climate change have created a shift in the physical traits required for sled dogs to thrive in warmer environments. This includes breeding dogs with traits better suited for warmer conditions, which contrasts with traditional breeding practices focused on stamina for colder climates.

=== Breeds ===
==== Alaskan husky ====
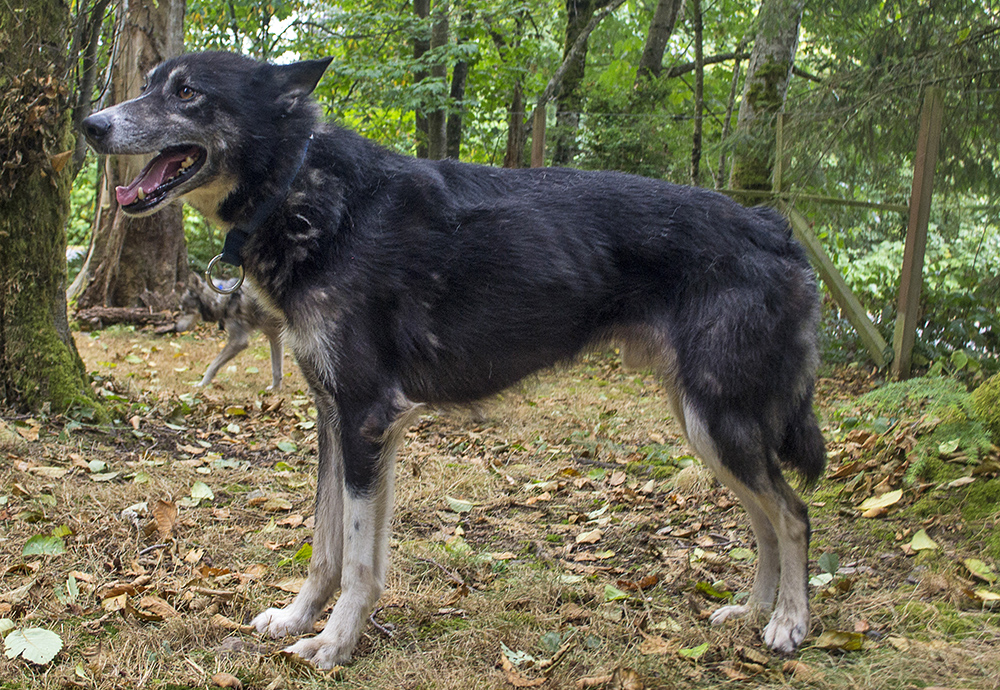
An Alaskan husky

The Alaskan husky is the most commonly used dog in sled dog racing. It is a mongrel bred specifically for its performance as a sled dog. There are two genetically distinct varieties of the Alaskan husky: a sprinting group and a long-distance group. Alaskan Malamutes and Siberian Huskies contributed the most genetically to the long-distance group, while English Pointers and Salukis contributed the most to the sprinting group. Anatolian Shepherd Dogs contributed a strong work ethic to both varieties. There are many Alaskan huskies that are part Greyhound, which improves their speed.

==== Alaskan Malamute ====
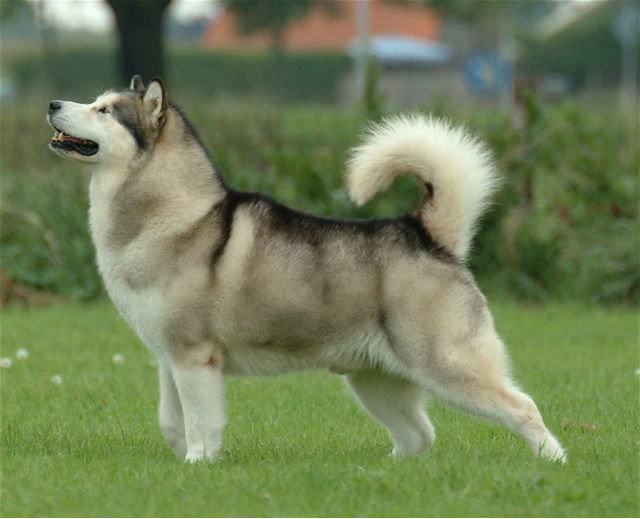
An Alaskan Malamute

Alaskan Malamutes are large, strong freight dogs. They weigh between 36 and 54 kg (80 and 120 lb) and have round faces with soft features. Freight dogs are a class of dogs that includes both pedigree and non-pedigree dogs. Alaskan Malamutes are thought to be one of the first domesticated breeds of dogs, originating in the Kotzebue Sound region of Alaska. These dogs are known for their broad chests, thick coats, and tough feet. Speed has little to no value for these dogs - instead, the emphasis is on pulling strength. They are used in expedition and long adventure trips, and for hauling heavy loads. Alaskan Malamutes were the dog of choice for hauling and messenger work in World War II.

==== Canadian Eskimo Dog ====
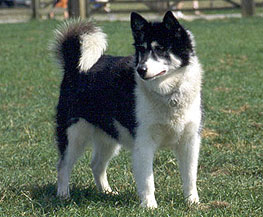
A Canadian Eskimo Dog

The Canadian Eskimo Dog or Canadian Inuit Dog, also known as the Exquimaux Husky, Esquimaux Dog, and Qimmiq (an Inuit language word for dog), has its origins in the aboriginal sled dogs used by the Thule people of Arctic Canada. The breed as it exists today was primarily developed through the work of the Canadian government. It is capable of pulling between 45 and 80 kg (100 and 180 lb) per dog for distances between 25 and 115 km (15 and 70 mi). The Canadian Eskimo Dog was also used as a hunting dog, helping Inuit hunters to catch seals, muskoxen, and polar bears. On 1 May 2000, the Canadian territory of Nunavut officially adopted the "Canadian Inuit Dog" as the animal symbol of the territory. They are considered genetically to be the same breed as the Greenland Dog, as research shows they have not yet diverged enough genetically to be considered separate breeds.

==== Chinook ====
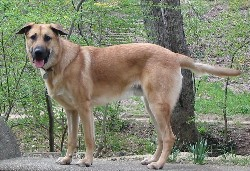
Chinook

The Chinook is a rare breed of sled dog developed in New Hampshire in the early 1900s by Arthur Walden, a gold rush adventurer and dog driver, and is a blend of English Mastiff, Greenland Dog, German Shepherd Dog, and Belgian Shepherd. It is the state dog of New Hampshire and was recognized by the American Kennel Club (AKC) in the Working Group in 2013. They are described as athletic and "hard bodied" with a "tireless gait". Their coat colour is always tawny, ranging from a pale honey color to reddish-gold.

==== Chukotka sled dog ====
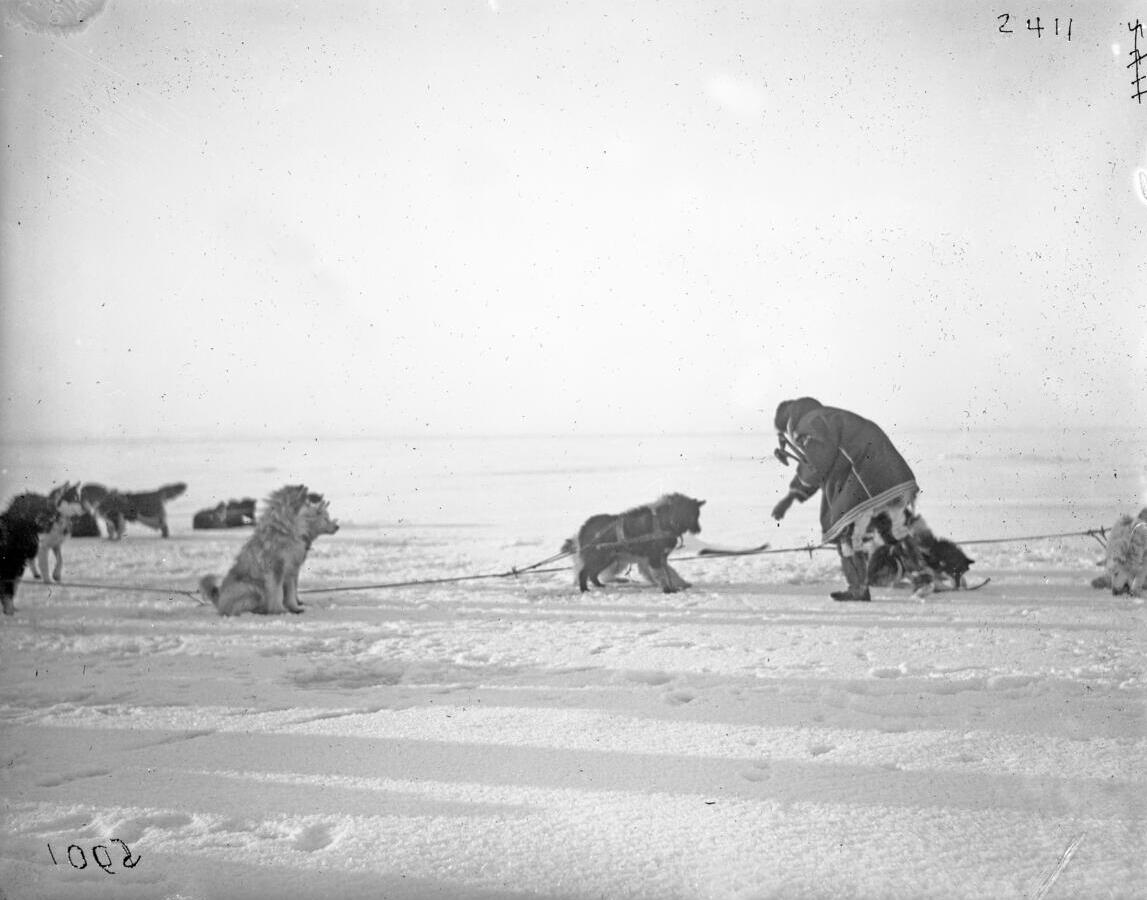
Chukotka sled dogs in the early 20th century

The Chukotka sled dog (чукотская ездовая) is the aboriginal spitz breed of dog indigenous to the Chukchi people of Russia. Chukotka sled dog teams have been used since prehistoric times to pull sleds in harsh conditions, such as hunting sea mammals on oceanic pack ice. Chukotka sled dogs are most famous as the progenitor of the Siberian husky.

==== Czech Mountain Dog ====
The Czech Mountain Dog is a sled dog breed that originated in Czechoslovakia in the 1970s using Slovak Cuvac and a Canadian sled dog in response to limited availability of traditional sled dog breeds due to the Iron Curtain.

==== Eurohound ====
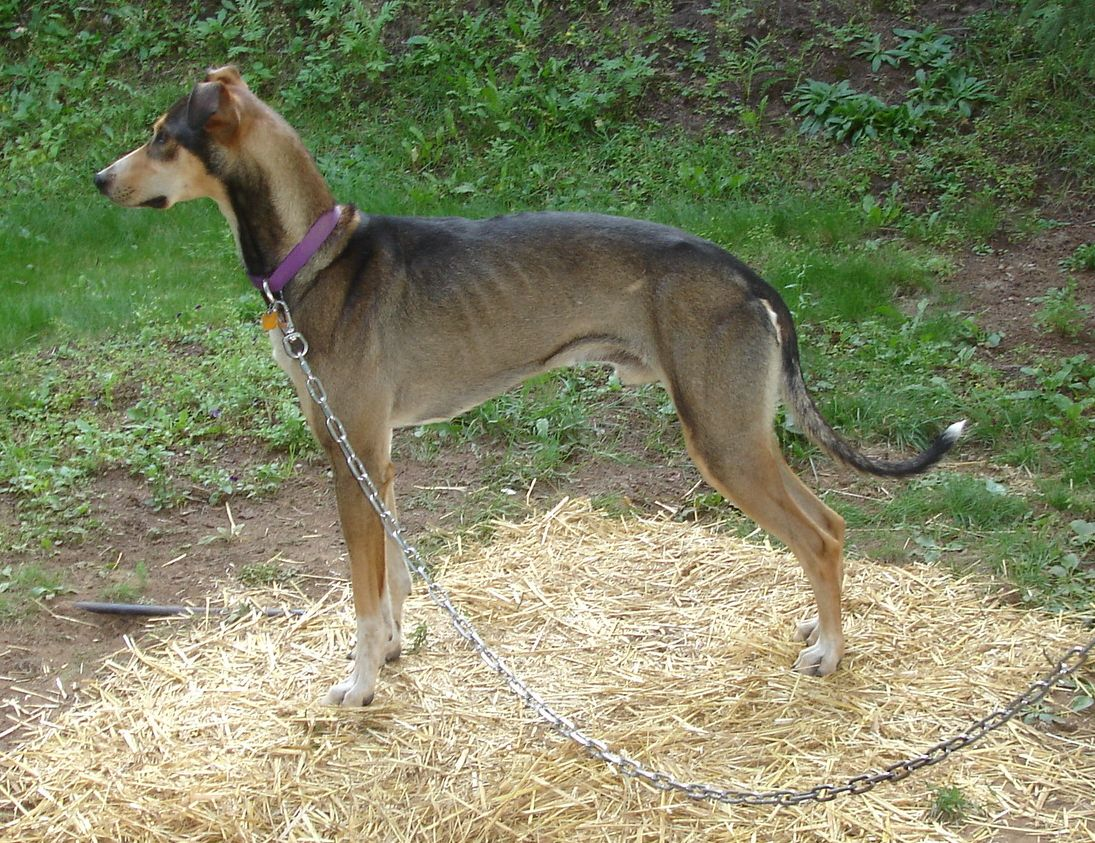
Eurohound

A Eurohound is a type of dog bred for sprint-style sled dog racing. The Eurohound is typically crossbred from the Alaskan husky group and any of a number of pointing breeds ("pointers").

==== Greenland Dog ====
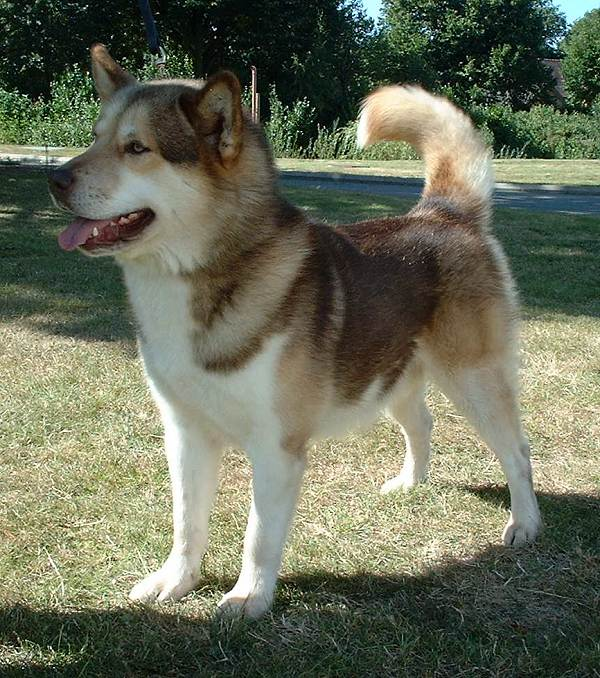
Greenland Dog

Greenland Dogs are heavy dogs with high endurance but little speed. They are frequently used by people offering dog sled adventures and long expeditions. As of 2016, there were about 15,000 Greenland Dogs living in Greenland, but decades ago the number was significantly higher and projects have been initiated to ensure the survival of the breed. In many regions north of the Arctic Circle in Greenland, they are a primary mode of transportation in the winter. Most hunters in Greenland favour dog sled teams over snowmobiles, as the dog sled teams are more reliable. They are considered genetically to be the same breed as the Canadian Eskimo Dog, as research shows they have not yet diverged enough genetically to be considered separate breeds.

==== Greyster ====
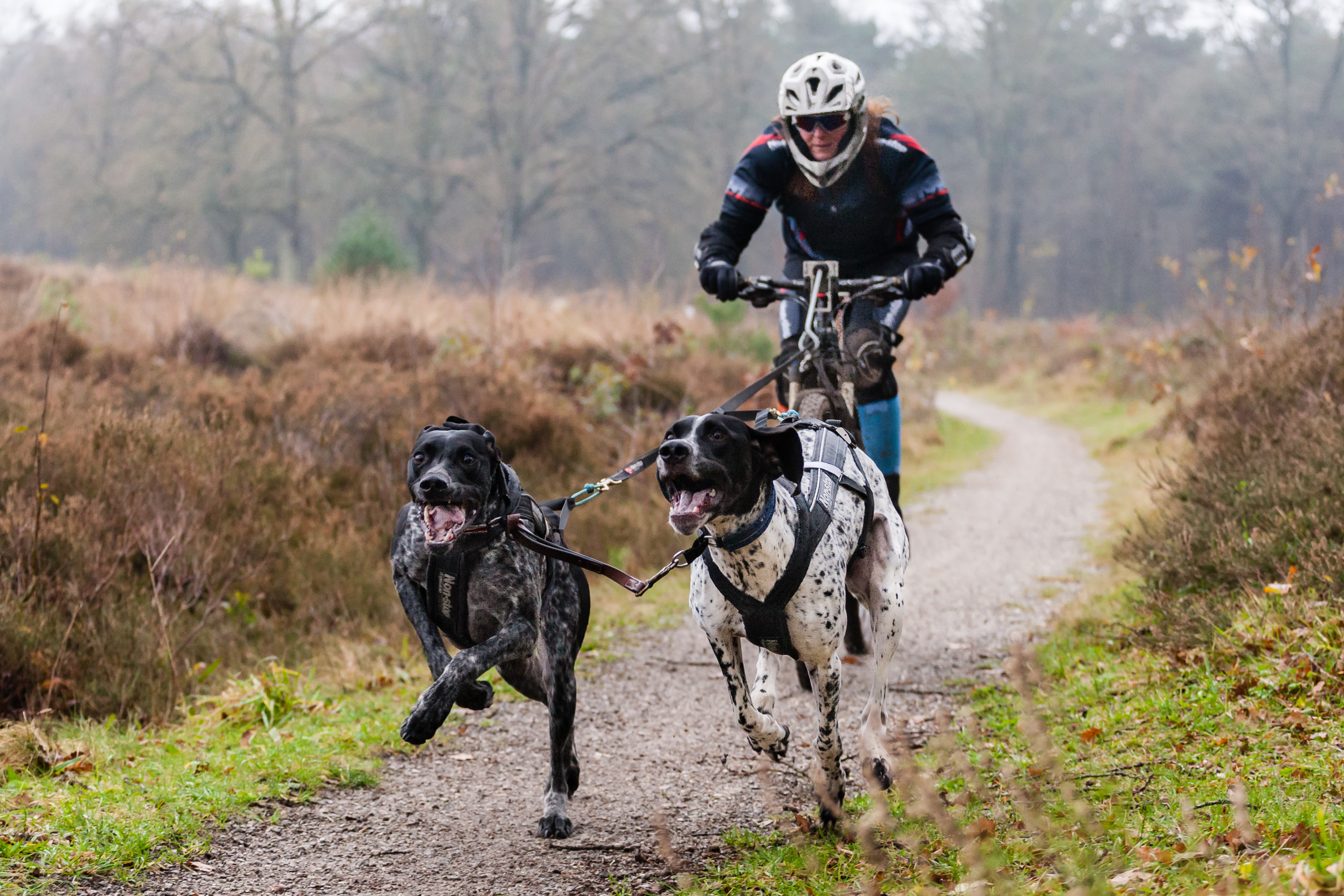
Greysters Scooterjoring

The Greyster is a type of sled dog bred for sled dog racing, especially dryland sports like canicross and bikejoring. The Greyster is crossbred from the Greyhound and the German Shorthair Pointer.

==== Kamchatka Sled Dog ====
The Kamchatka Sled Dog is a rare landrace of sled laika developed by the Itelmen and Koryak people of Kamchatka, Russia. There are currently efforts underway to revive the breed.

==== Labrador Husky ====
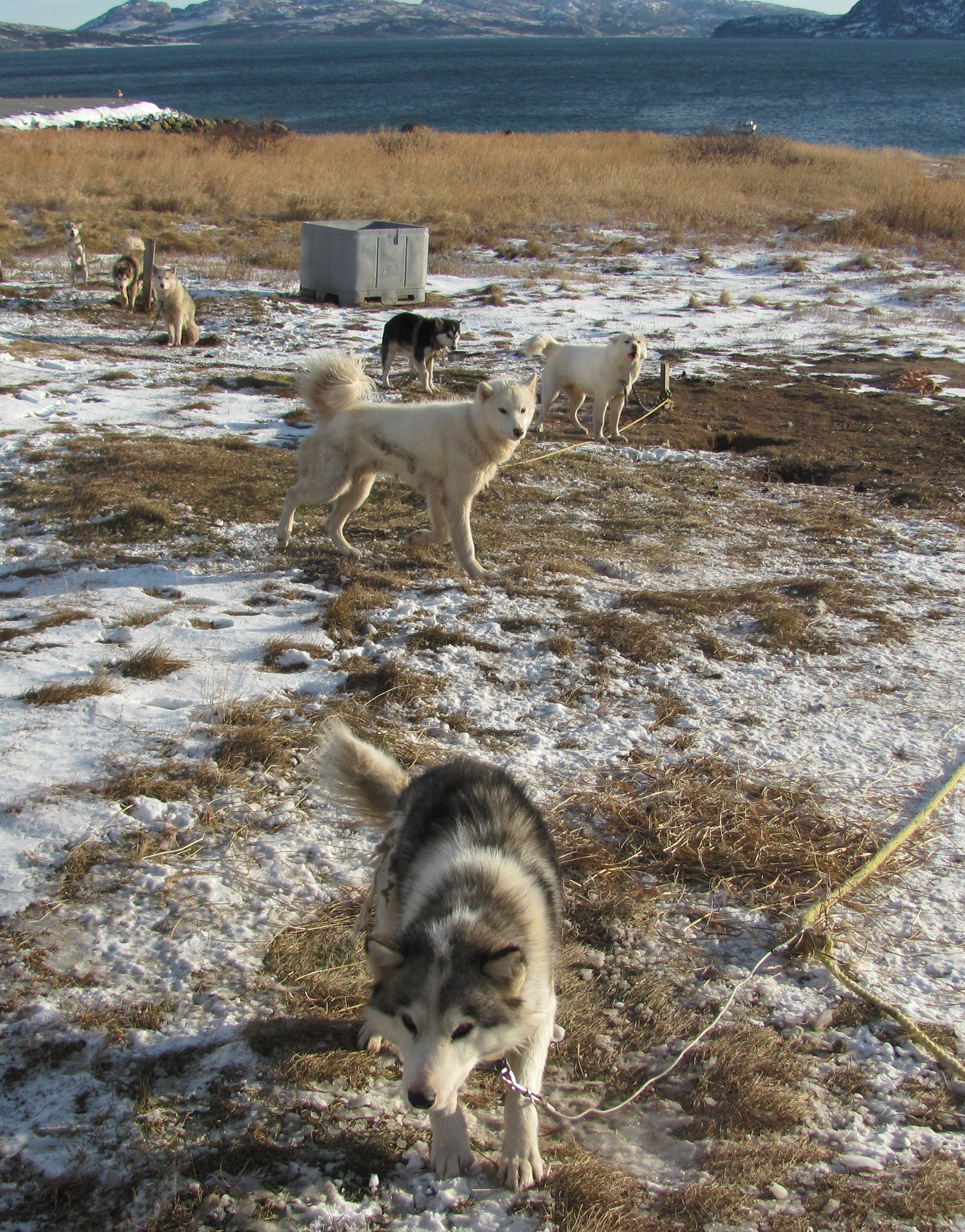
Labrador Huskies

The Labrador Husky originated in the Labrador portion of the Canadian province of Newfoundland and Labrador. The breed probably arrived in the area with the Inuit who came to Canada around 1300 AD. Despite the name, Labrador Huskies are not related to the Labrador Retriever, but in fact most closely related to the Canadian Eskimo Dog. There are estimated to be 50–60 Labrador huskies in the world.

==== MacKenzie River husky ====
The term Mackenzie River husky describes several overlapping local populations of Arctic and sub-Arctic sled dog-type dogs, none of which constitutes a breed. Dogs from Yukon were crossed with large European breeds such as St. Bernards and Newfoundlands to create a powerful freighting dog capable of surviving harsh Arctic conditions.

==== Samoyed ====
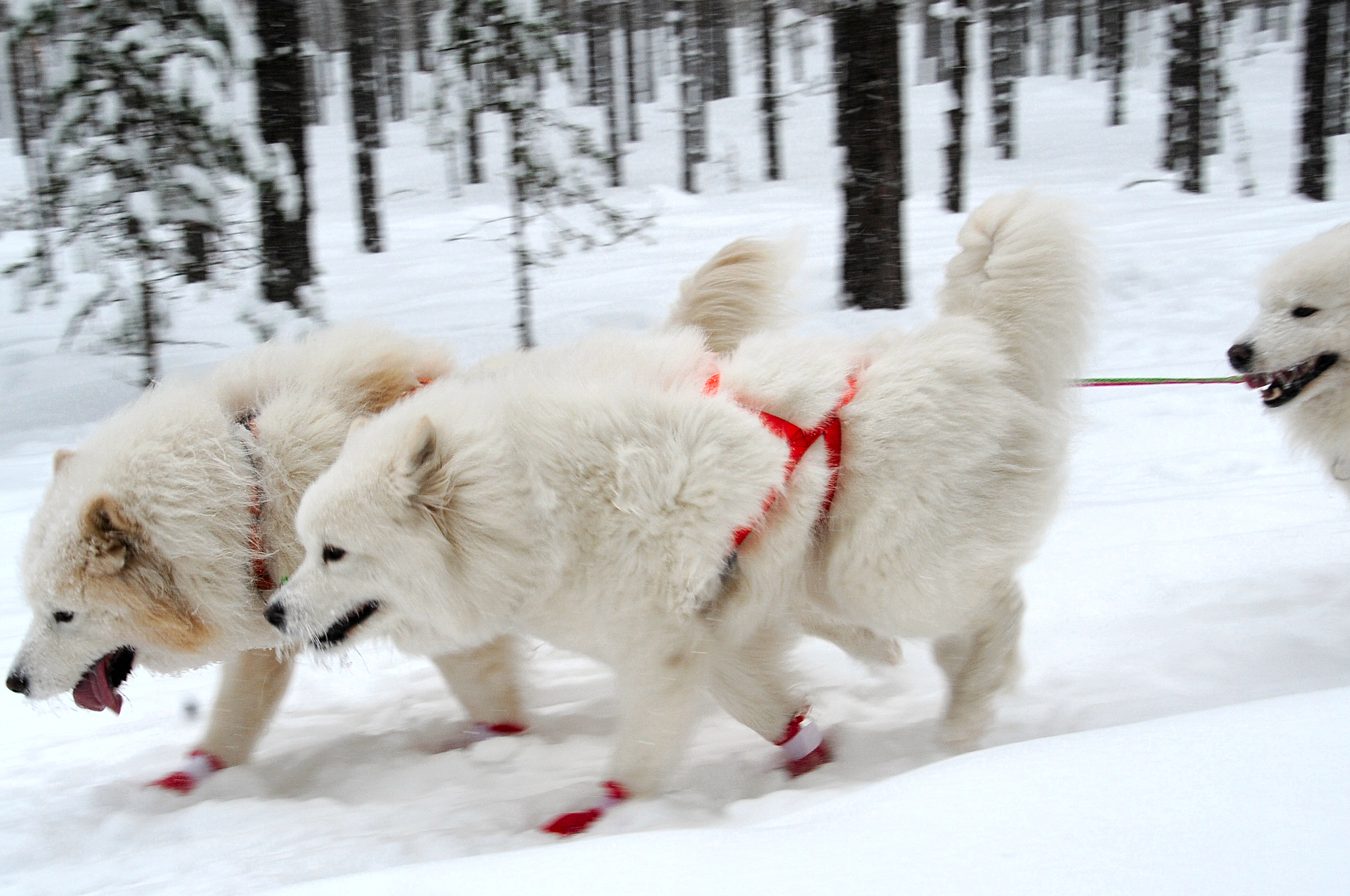
Samoyed

The Samoyed is a laika developed by the Samoyede people of Siberia, who used them to herd reindeer and hunt, in addition to hauling sleds. These dogs were so prized, and the people who owned them so dependent upon them for survival, that the dogs were allowed to sleep in the tents with their owners. Samoyeds weigh about 20 to 29 kg (45 to 65 lb) for males and 16 to 23 kg (35 to 50 lb) for females and stands from 480 to 600 mm (19 to 23.5 in) at the shoulder.

==== Sakhalin Husky ====
The Sakhalin Husky, also known as the Karafuto Ken (樺太犬), is a breed of sled dog developed on the island of Sakhalin. Sakhalin huskies are prized for their hardiness, great temperaments and easy trainability, even being the preferred dog used by the Soviet army for hauling gear in harsh condition prior to World War II. Unfortunately with the advent of mechanized travel, Soviet officials determined that the cost of maintaining Sakhalins was wasteful and exterminated them, with only a handful residing in Japan surviving. There are approximately 20 Sakhalin Huskies remaining on Sakhalin Island.

==== Siberian Husky ====
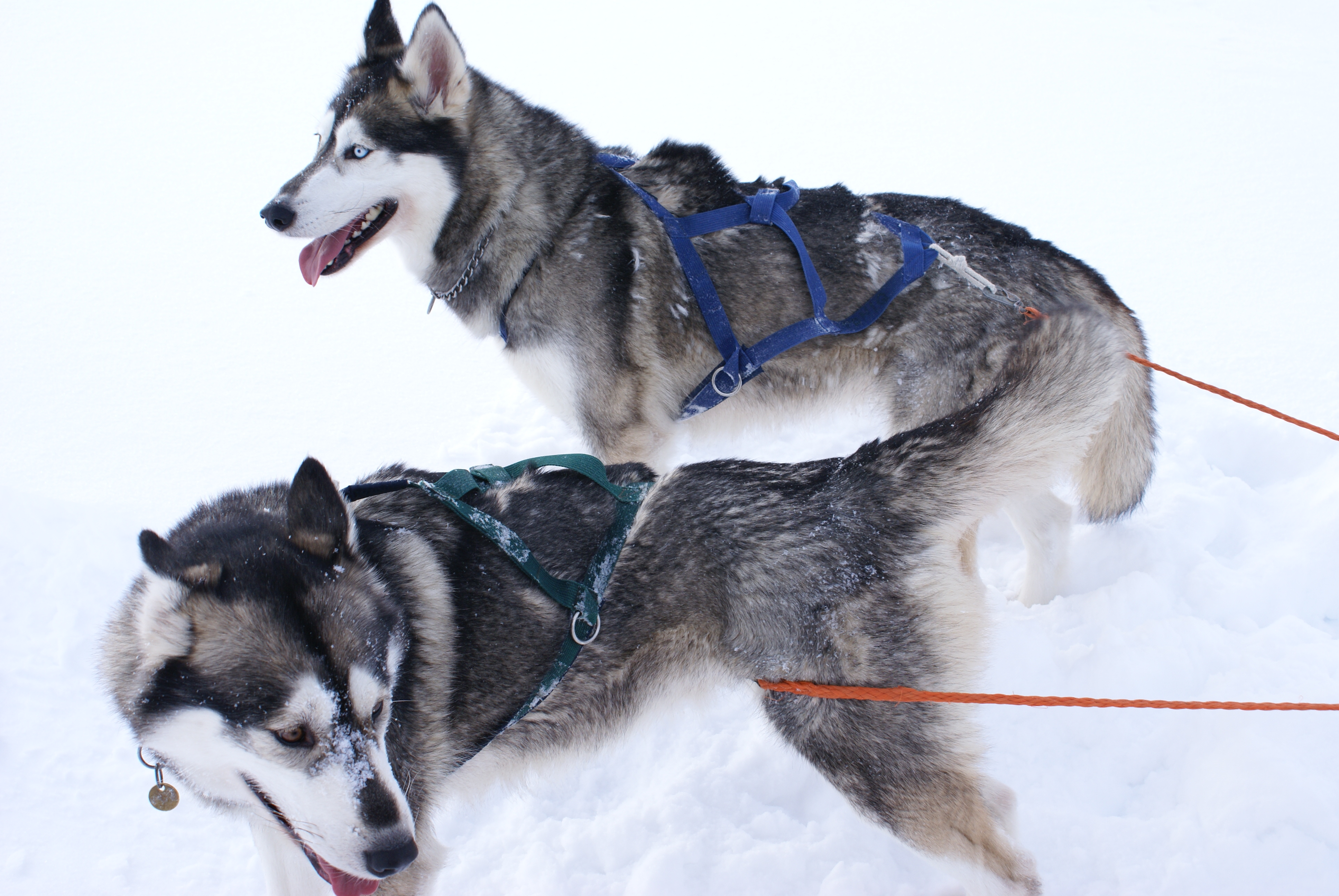
Siberian Huskies

The Siberian Husky is smaller than the similar-appearing Alaskan Malamute, but pulls more, pound for pound, than a Malamute. Descendants of the sled dogs bred and used by the native Chukchi people of Siberia which were imported to Alaska in the early 1900s, they were used as working dogs and racing sled dogs in Nome, Alaska throughout the 1910s, often dominating the All-Alaska Sweepstakes. They later became widely bred by recreational mushers and show-dog fanciers in the United States and Canada as the Siberian Husky, after the popularity garnered from the 1925 serum run to Nome. Siberians stand 510–600 mm (20–23.5 in), weigh between 16 and 27 kg (35 and 60 lb) (16–23 kg (35–50 lb) for females, 20–27 kg (45–60 lb) for males), and have been selectively bred for both appearance and pulling ability. They are still used regularly today as sled dogs by competitive, recreational, and tour-guide mushers.

==== Yakutian Laika ====
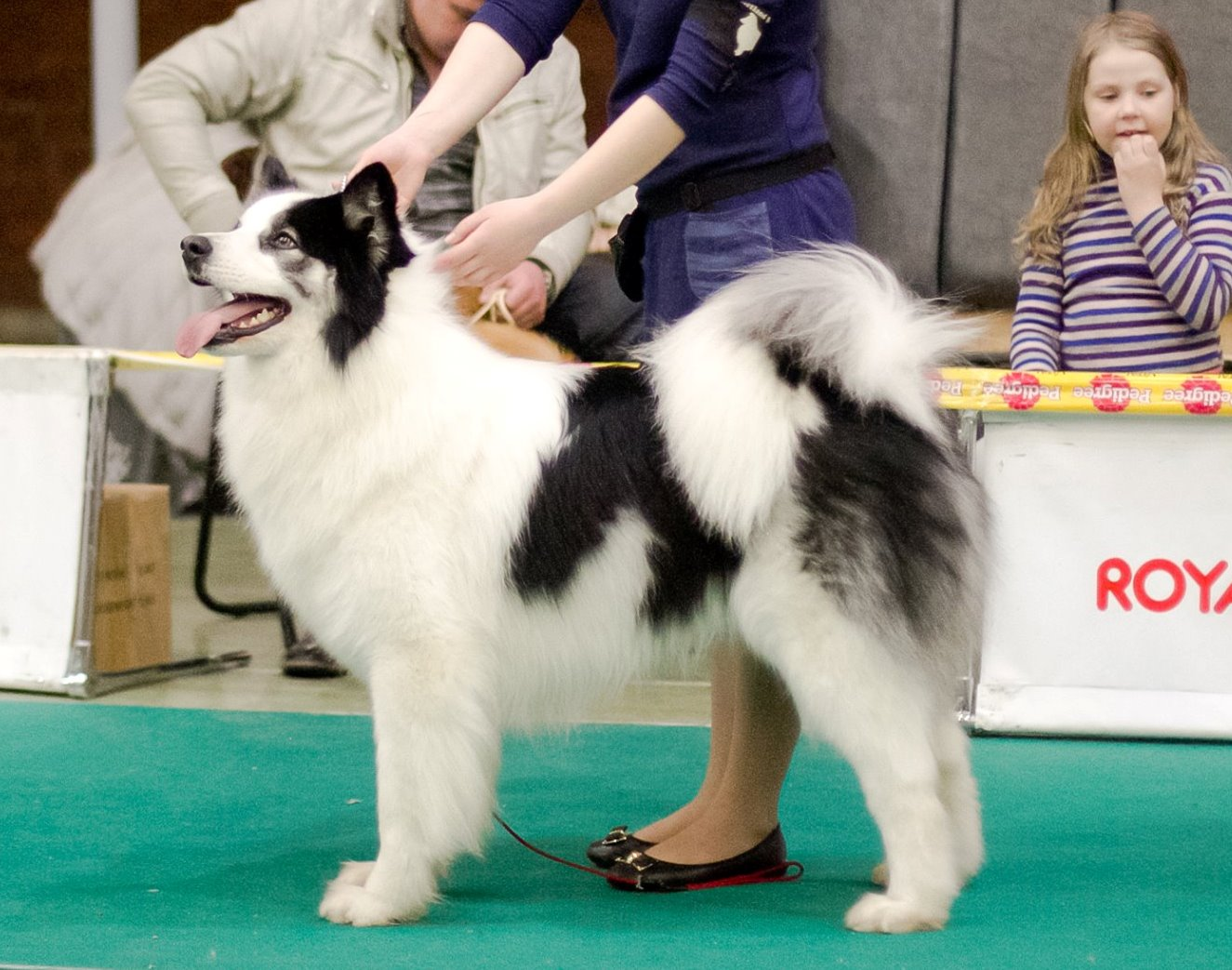
Yakutian Laika

The Yakutian Laika is an ancient working dog breed that originated in the Arctic seashore of the Sakha (Yakutia) Republic. In terms of functionality, Yakutian Laikas are a sled laika, being able to herd, hunt, and as well as haul freight. The Yakutian Laika is recognized by the Fédération Cynologique Internationale (FCI) and the AKC's Foundation Stock Service. The Yakutian Laika is a medium size, strong and compact dog, with powerful muscles and thick double coat to handle bitter Arctic temperatures. They were the preferred dog of Russian polar explorer Georgy Ushakov, who prized them for their hardiness and versatility, being able to hunt seals and polar bears as well as haul sleds for thousands of miles.

=== Other breeds ===
Numerous non-sled dog breeds have been used as sled dogs. Poodles, Irish Setters, German Shorthaired Pointers, Labrador Retrievers, Golden Retriever, Newfoundlands, Chow Chows and St. Bernards have all been used to pull sleds in the past.

== World Championships ==
FSS held the first World Championships in Saint Moritz, Switzerland in 1990 with classes in only Sled Sprint (10-Dog, 8-Dog, and 6-Dog) and Skidog Pulka for men and women. 113 competitors arrived in the starting chutes to mark the momentous occasion. At first World Championships were held each year, but after the 1995 events, it was decided to hold them every two years, which facilitated the bidding process and enabled the host organization more time for preparation.

== Famous sled dogs ==
=== Balto ===
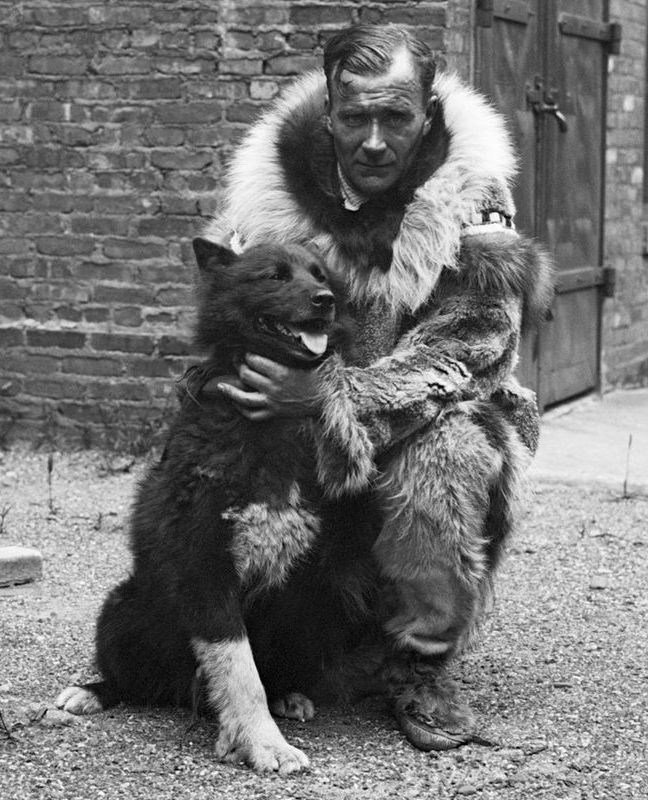
Gunnar Kaasen with Balto

Balto was the lead dog of the sled dog team that carried the diphtheria serum on the last leg of the relay to Nome during the 1925 diphtheria epidemic. He was driven by musher Gunnar Kaasen, who worked for Leonhard Seppala. Seppala had also bred Balto.

In 1925, 10 months after Balto completed his run, a bronze statue was erected in his honour in Central Park near the Tisch Children's Zoo. The statue was sculpted by Frederick George Richard Roth. Children frequently climb the statue to pretend to ride on the dog. The plaque at the base of the statue reads "Endurance · Fidelity · Intelligence". Balto's body was stuffed following his death in 1933, and is on display at the Cleveland Museum of Natural History.

In 1995, a Universal Pictures animated movie based loosely on him, Balto, was released.

=== Togo ===
Togo was the lead sled dog of Leonhard Seppala and his dog sled team in the 1925 serum run to Nome across central and northern Alaska. Seppala considered Togo to be the greatest sled dog and lead dog of his mushing career, and of that age in Alaska, stating in 1960: "I never had a better dog than Togo. His stamina, loyalty and intelligence could not be improved upon. Togo was the best dog that ever traveled the Alaska trail."

Katy Steinmetz in Time Magazine named Togo the most heroic animal of all time, writing that "the dog that often gets credit for eventually saving the town is Balto, but he just happened to run the last, 55-mile leg in the race. The sled dog who did the lion's share of the work was Togo. His journey, fraught with white-out storms, was the longest by 200 miles and included a traverse across perilous Norton Sound — where he saved his team and driver in a courageous swim through ice floes."

Togo would go on to become one of the foundation dogs for lines of Siberian sled dogs, and including eventually the Siberian Husky registered breed.

In 2019, Walt Disney Pictures released Togo, a film starring Willem Dafoe as Leonard Seppala.

=== Taro and Jiro ===
In 1958, an ill-fated Japanese research expedition to Antarctica made an emergency evacuation, leaving behind 15 sled dogs. The researchers believed that a relief team would arrive within a few days, so they left the dogs chained up outside with a small supply of food; however, the weather turned bad and the team never made it to the outpost. One year later, a new expedition arrived and discovered that two of the dogs, Taro and Jiro, had survived. The breed spiked in popularity upon the release of the 1983 film Nankyoku Monogatari. A second film from 2006, Eight Below, provided a fictional version of the occurrence, but did not reference the breed. Instead, the film features only eight dogs: two Alaskan Malamutes, and six Siberian Huskies.

=== Other dogs ===
Anna was a small sled dog who ran on the team of Pam Flowers during her expedition to become the first woman to cross the Northern Passage route alone. Anna was noted for being the smallest dog to run on the team, and Flowers created a picture book about their journey in the Arctic.

There are numerous stories of blind sled dogs that continue to run, either on their own or with assistance from other dogs on the team.

== See also ==
- List of sled dog races
- Sled dog racing at the 1932 Winter Olympics
- Drafting dog
- Manhauling
