= Greenland Dog =

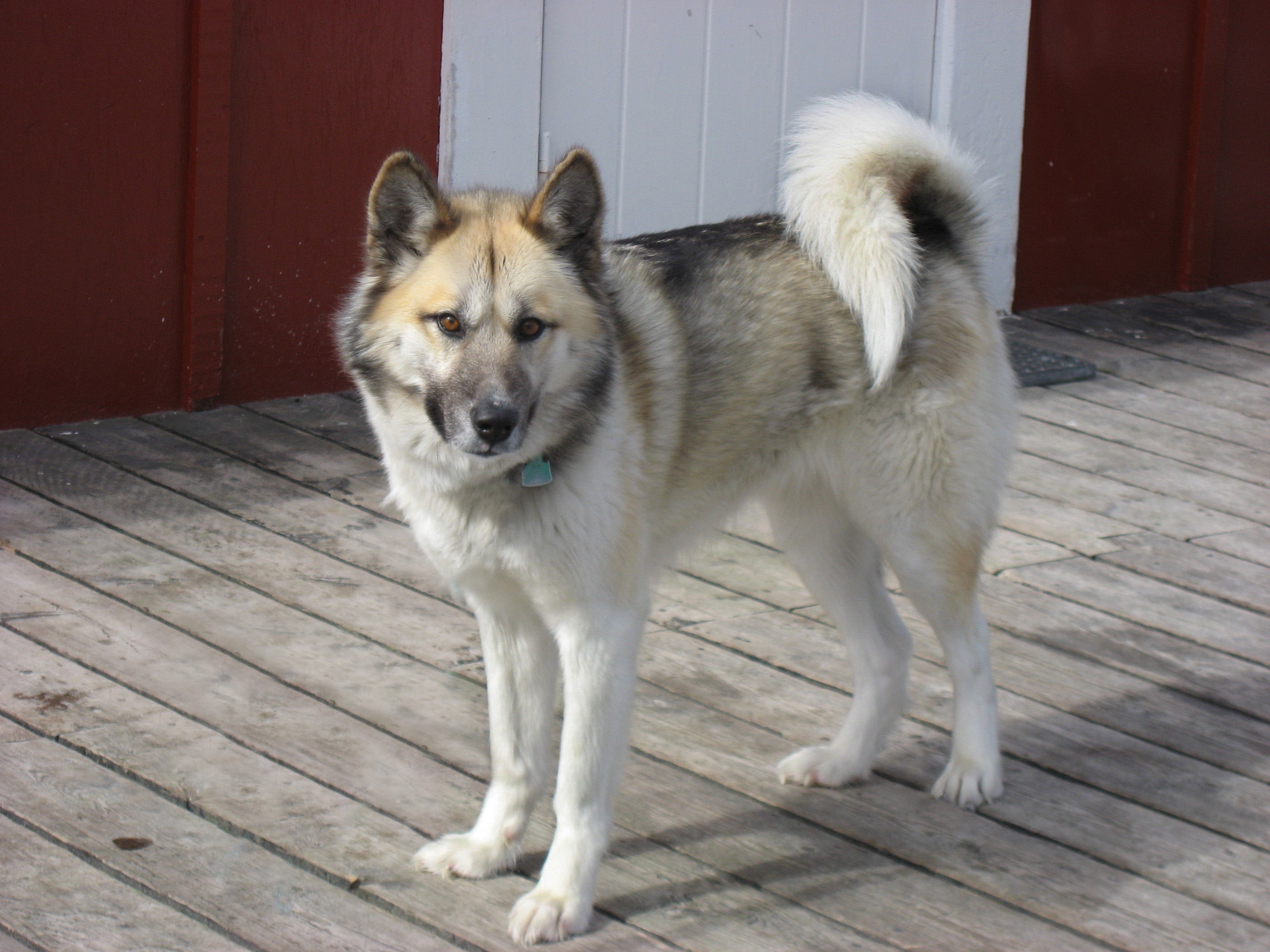

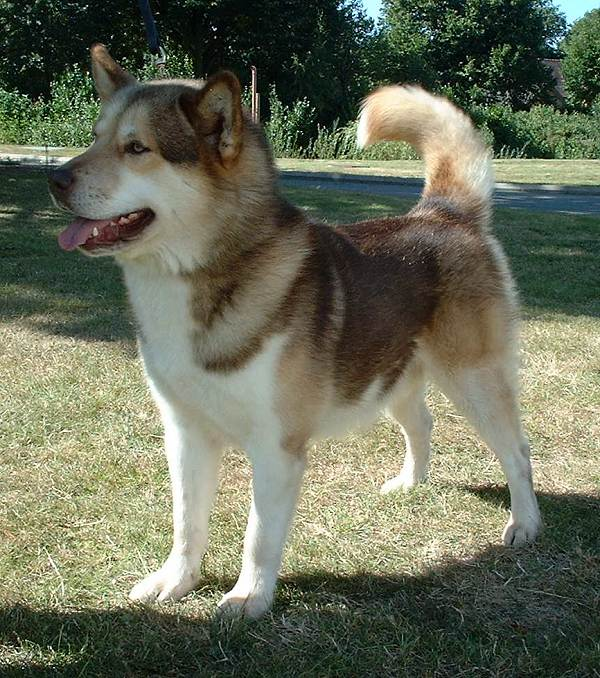
- Other names: Esquimaux Dog; Grønlandshund; Grünlandshund; Kalaallit qimmiat; Qimmeq Qimuttoq
- Origin: Denmark
- Distribution: Greenland
Traits
Height	Males	minimun 60 cm (24 in)
	Females	minimun 55 cm (22 in)
- Coat: thick, double
- Colour: any, from fawn to black (excluding albino and merle)
Kennel club standards
- Dansk Kennel Club: standard
- Fédération Cynologique Internationale: standard

The Greenland Dog (Greenlandic: Kalaallit Qimmiat, Danish: Grønlandshund) is a breed of large dog of husky type. It is kept as a sled dog. It descends from dogs brought from Siberia to North America by the Thule people 1000 years ago, as does the Canadian Eskimo Dog – to which is sometimes considered to be identical, despite their geographic isolation.

The Greenland Dog is considered nationally and culturally important to Greenland and efforts are made to safeguard its purity. In western Greenland north of the Arctic Circle and the entirety of eastern Greenland, it is illegal to import any dog from outside (except for police and assistance dogs with a special permit), and since 2017 all dogs have to be microchipped and registered in the Greenland dog database. In the southwest, such restrictions are not in place and the purity of dogs is not monitored. As the population has been falling (c. 15,000 in Greenland as of 2016, and 12,000 as of 2021), a number of projects have been initiated in an attempt of ensuring that Greenland's dog sledding culture, knowledge and use, along with the breed itself, are not lost.

== History ==
An Esquimaux bitch was exhibited at one of the earliest dog shows held in Darlington, Britain on 29 July 1875, which was reported in the Live Stock Journal and Fanciers Gazette published on 6 August 1875. They were recognized by the Kennel Club at its foundation in 1880.

The Greenland dog has been a draught animal in the Arctic regions for centuries and consequently they have developed a powerful body and heavy coats, with a natural capacity for load pulling and endurance in a harsh working environment. Roald Amundsen later used Greenland dogs to great success on his 1912 expedition to the Antarctic, where he became the first person to reach the South Pole. The men started with more dogs than they technically needed to pull the sledges, killing them along the way to use as food for dogs and men.

== Lineage ==
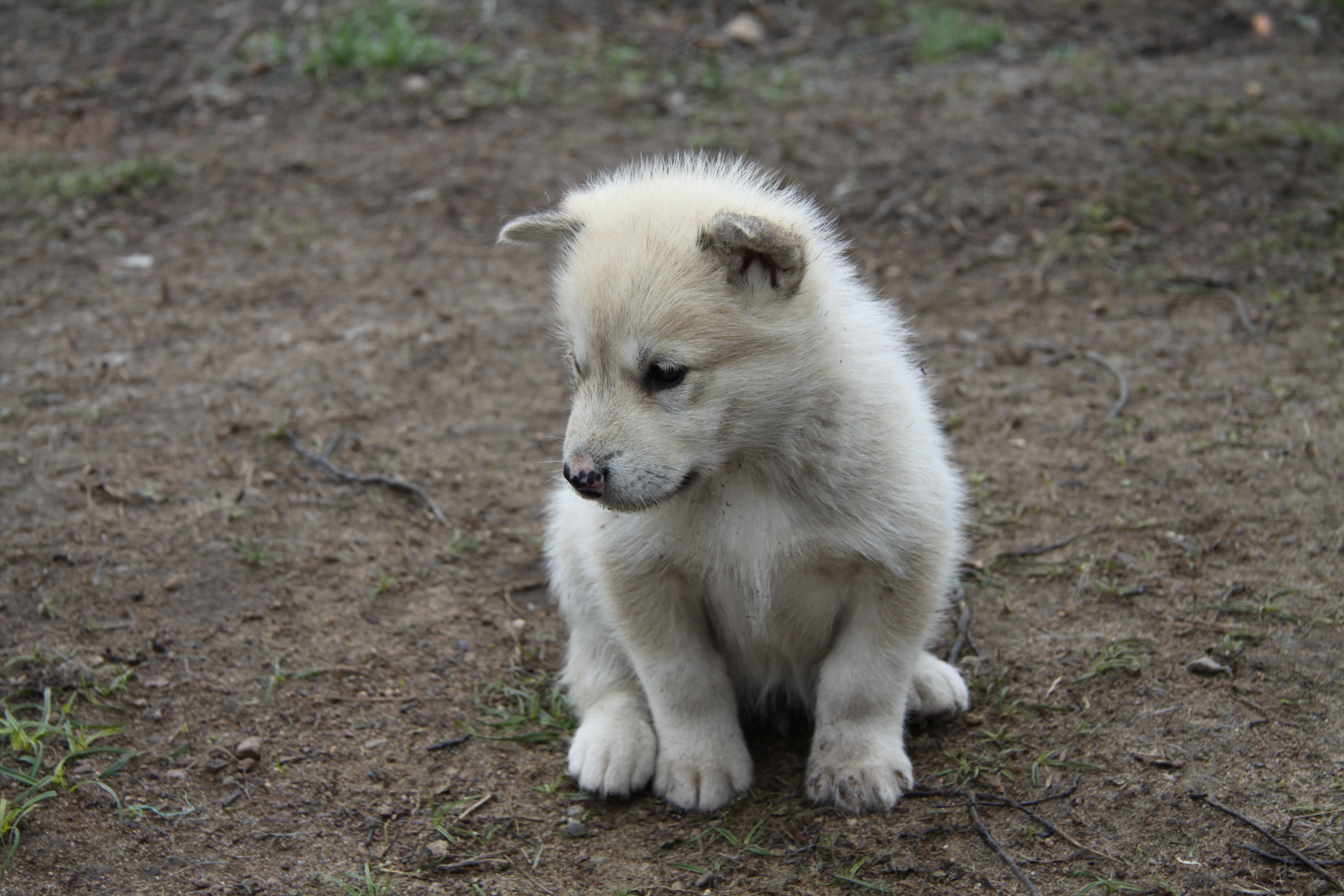
A puppy

The first dogs arrived in the Americas 12,000 years ago. However, people and their dogs did not settle in the Arctic until the Paleo-Eskimo people 4,500 years ago and then the Thule people 1,000 years ago, both originating from Siberia. Dogs first appeared in Greenland around 4,000 years ago. The Inuit dogs from Canada (Canadian Eskimo Dog) and Greenland (Greenland Dog) descended from dogs associated with Thule people, who relied on them for transportation from Siberia. In 2015, a study using a number of genetic markers indicated that these were both the same dog and should not be treated as separate breeds, that they maintain an indigenous heritage that predates colonization and the timing corresponds with the arrival of the Thule people, and that they were distinct from Siberian Huskies, Alaskan Huskies and Malamutes. The maternal mitochondrial DNA sequences of the Inuit dogs were classified as haplotype A31 that indicates a common female ancestor, and this haplotype could not be found in other modern dogs but the nearest match was with a 1,000 year-old dog from Florida.

Nearly all dog breeds’ genetic closeness to the grey wolf is due to admixture. However, several Arctic dog breeds show a genetic closeness with the now-extinct Taimyr wolf of North Asia due to admixture. These breeds are associated with high latitudes – the Siberian Husky and Greenland Dog that are also associated with Arctic human populations, and to a lesser extent the Shar Pei and Finnish Spitz. An admixture graph of the Greenland dog indicates a best-fit of 3.5% shared material, however an ancestry proportion ranging between 1.4% and 27.3% is consistent with the data. This indicates admixture between the Taymyr wolf population and the ancestral dog population of these 4 high-latitude breeds. This introgression could have provided early dogs living in high latitudes with phenotypic variation beneficial for adaption to a new and challenging environment. It also indicates the ancestry of present-day dog breeds descends from more than one region.

In 2020, a genetic study found that Greenland sled dogs have been kept isolated from other breeds since their arrival in Greenland with the Inuit 850 years ago. Their lineage traces more genomic history than other arctic-breeds to their ancestor's remains which were found on Zhokhov Island, arctic northeastern Siberia and dated to be 9,500 years old. Based on this study, the Greenland Dog is considered one of the oldest dog breeds according to Guinness World Records.

== Characteristics ==
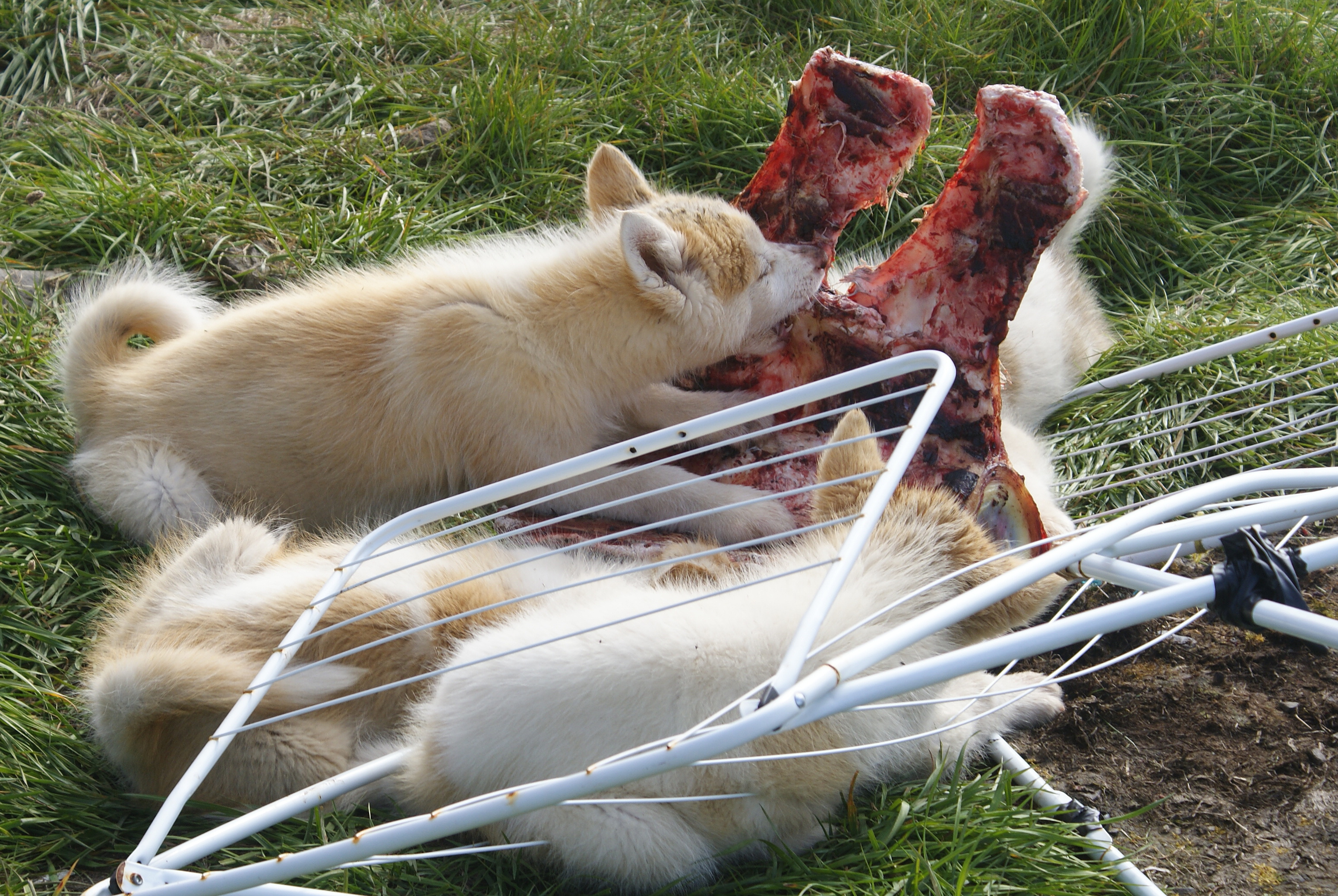
Puppies eating muskox scraps

The Greenland Dog is a powerful, heavy-built dog. It has a broad, wedge-shaped head, slightly tilted eyes and small, triangular ears covered with thick fur that prevents frostbite. It has strong, muscular, short-haired legs. The tail is usually rolled along/across its back. When it lies down and curls up to rest, the tail often covers the nose. Its coat is of medium length and consists of two layers. The inner layer consists of short wool-like fur, the outer layer of longer, coarser, water-repellent fur. The Greenland Dog comes in all colors, from black to fawn (excluding albino dogs and merle patterning). Blue eyes and heterochromia are not permitted, and are considered disqualifications based on standard.

A characteristic of most Greenland Dogs is the "úlo", a triangular shaped area on the shoulders. It is named after a common woman's-knife from Greenland which is of the same shape.

Males are significantly larger than females at 60cm (23.6in) and up at the withers; females are 55cm (21.7in) and up.

== Use ==
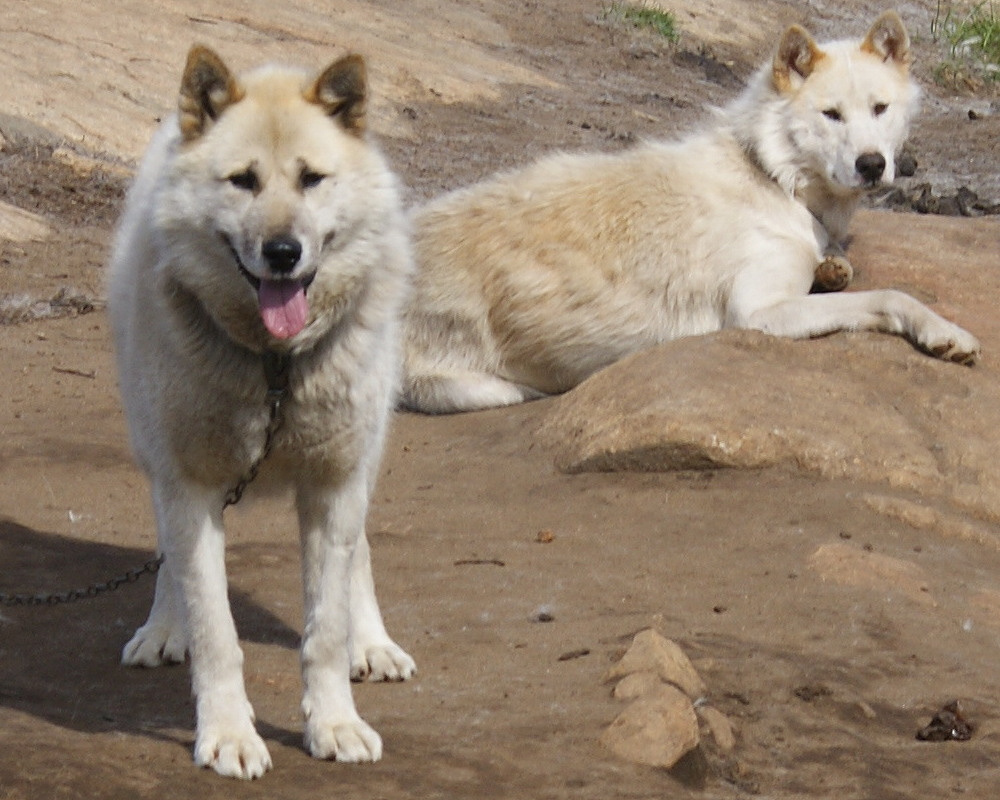
In Sisimiut in summer

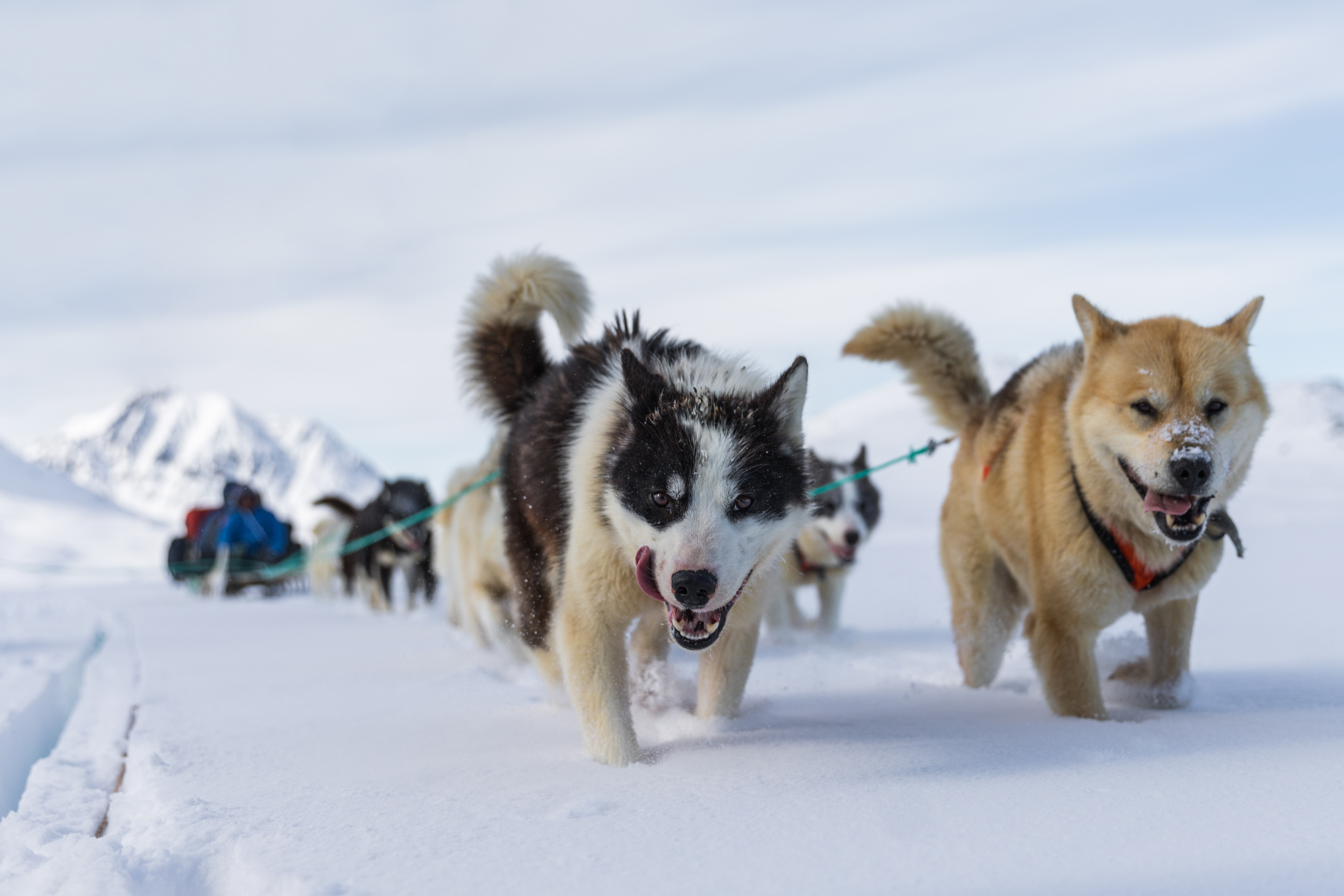
In winter near Kulusuk

The Greenland Dog is kept as a sled dog. It has the necessary physical strength and endurance, and moves fast and easily over difficult terrain.
