= Canicross =

Sport of cross country running with dogs

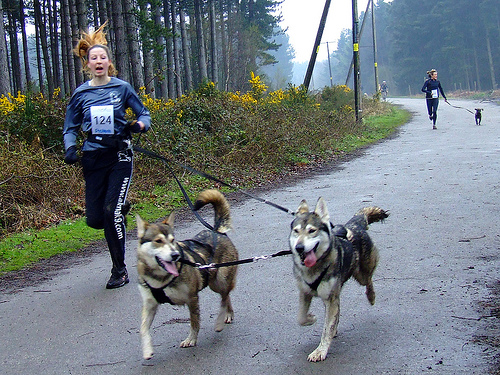
A woman canicrossing with two dogs

Canicross is the sport of cross country running with dogs. Originating in Europe as off-season training for the mushing (sledding) community, it has become popular as a stand-alone sport all over Europe, especially in the UK, and the United States.

Canicross can be run with one or two dogs, always attached to the runner. The runner wears a waist belt, the dog a specifically designed harness, and the two are joined by a bungee cord or elastic line that reduces shock to both human and dog when the dog pulls.

Originally canicross dogs were of sledding or spitz types such as the husky or malamute but now all breeds have begun taking part including cross breeds, small terrier breeds to large breeds such as rottweilers and standard poodles. The Eurohound was bred specifically for dryland dog sports. Some breeds are very well suited to not only running and pulling but running at steady pace over a long distance.

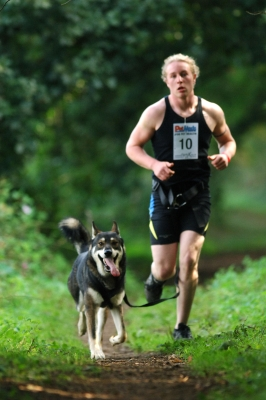
A competitor at Paws In The Park canicross event

== Canicross in Europe ==
The first canicross event staged in the UK took place in 2000. In 2006/07 CaniX UK ran the first UK National Championship, the 2015/16 season will be the 10th UK National Championship. During this period over 2,500 UK dogs/competitors have taken part in 250 CaniX events. In March 2008 CaniX UK ran the first ever cani-cross event at Crufts, the largest dog show held in the world. Over 100 runners and their dogs took part in the event. In October 2012 CaniX UK hosted the first ECF European Canicross Championships in the UK in Cirencester, Gloucestershire. Representation in the UK to the International Canicross Federation is through the British Sleddog Sports Federation (BSSF)

Canicross events are held all over the UK and Europe by sleddog organisations, by canicross clubs and also many running events will allow runners to participate with their dogs. Distances vary, with events held to cover distances from a mile up to 28 miles or more.

=== Canicross in Italy ===
In Italy canicross is sanctioned by the CSEN (sports promotion organisation officially recognised by the Italian National Olympic Committee), and also by privately held circuit FISC.

== Canicross in the United States ==
Canicross, sometimes referred to as urban mushing, caniXC, or caniX, is lesser known in the United States, but most prevalent in cooler climate areas. It is gaining momentum through organizations such as North American Canicross, the United States Federation of Sleddog Sports, regional sled dog clubs, and Kenosha Running Company. There are several sanctioned events throughout the year. North American Canicross offers a Titling Program where members can record mileage and races and earn challenge coins.

== Sources ==
- Robertson, Julia; Mead, Andy (2013), Physical Therapy and Massage for the Dog, CRC Press, ISBN 978-1-84076-609-7
