= Poultry World =

UK Magazine

Poultry World is a monthly UK magazine covering the egg and poultry farming sectors. Formerly a sister magazine to Farmers Weekly, it is now published by Misset Uitgeverij B.V. According to its profile on Media UK, it has a "pleasantly strong editorial approach and is a fine source of information for those breeding or rearing poultry in whatever capacity". The magazine is headquartered in London.

== History ==
Poultry World began as a weekly magazine titled "The Fanciers Gazette". The first issue appeared on 11 April 1874. It changed its name to Poultry World in 1909, and incorporated sister magazine Poultry Farmer in 1968.

In January 2019, RELX sold its Dutch agricultural media and selected international agricultural media portfolio to Doorakkeren BV which including Poultry World and several magazines (Farmers Weekly was sold separately later). Doorakkeren BV later founded a publishing company Misset Uitgeverij B.V. to manage the acquired portfolio.

== Circulation ==
It had a certified monthly circulation of 2,867 in 2011, according to the Audit Bureau of Circulations.
