= List of sled dog races =

Elements of a sled dog team

Supporters of mushing, the sport of racing sled dogs, have created dozens of contests. It is unknown when the first sled dog race was held. Humans have domesticated dogs for thousands of years, and sled dogs have been used for transportation in Arctic areas for almost as long. The first sled dog race to feature a codified set of rules was the All—Alaska Sweepstakes, which first took place in 1908. This was followed in 1917 by the American Dog Derby, which was the first sled dog race outside Alaska or the Yukon.

There are three typical types of sled dog races: sprint, mid-distance, and long-distance. These types can be broken down into sub-types. Sprint races cover relatively short distances, generally from 5 miles up to 30 miles/day, mid-distance races cover a total of 30 to 300 miles, and long-distance races cover 300 miles to more than 1,000 miles. Sprint races frequently are two- or three-day events with heats run on successive days with the same dogs on the same course. Mid-distance races are either heat races of 14 to 80 miles per day, or continuous races of 100 to 200 miles. (These categories are informal and may overlap to a certain extent.) Long-distance races may be continuous or stage races, in which participants run a different course each day, usually from a central staging location. Other similar sports that using mushing as a means for transport include; carting, pulka, dog scootering, skijoring, freighting, and weight pulling. These are not included in this list because they do not use sleds.

Generally, teams start one after another in equal time intervals, competing against the clock rather than directly against one another. This is due to logistic considerations of getting teams of dogs to the starting line for a clean timed start. Mass starts where all of the dog teams start simultaneously are popular in parts of Canada. Another mode of dogsled racing is the freight race, in which a specified weight per dog is carried in the sled.

== Sprint races ==
- Akiak Dash— Annual 60 miles (97 km) race from Bethel, Alaska to Akiak, Alaska and back.
- Apostle Islands Sled Dog Race — The largest sled dog race in the Midwestern United States, held at Bayfield, Wisconsin, on a 60 miles (97 km) course.
- American Dog Derby — Oldest dog sled race in the United States. The first American Dog Derby was held in 1917, and the races continued until being discontinued in the 1960s. The race was then revived in 1993 and still continues.
- Avannaata Qimussersua is Greenland's championship in dog sled racing, using the typically Greenlandic fan formation with 12 dogs. The championship includes all West Greenland settlements north of the Arctic Circle and is held annually in March or April. The route covers about 40 kilometres (25 mi), mainly on land but occasionally crossing lake and sea ice.
- Baltic Winter Cup — Series of sled dog races across the Baltic states, on snow as well as on dryland.
- Big Land Challenge Dog Team Race — Annual 20 kilometres (12 mi) race in Goose Bay, Labrador.
- Caledonia Classic Dog Sled Races — Annual 3-day event on and adjacent to beautiful Stuart Lake in Fort St. James, BC, Canada. 150 kilometres (93 mi) races plus sprints on well maintained trails both on and off lake.
- Dinner Plain Sled Dog Sprint — The only snow based sled dog race event staged in Australia. Short-distance sprint races take place annually at Dinner Plain located north east in the Victorian High Country.
- Northern Pines Sled Dog Race — annual race in Iron River, Wisconsin featuring several classes including a 32 miles (51 km) class, a 16 miles (26 km) class, an 8.2 miles (13.2 km) class and a 4.4 miles (7.1 km) class as well as a weight pull and kid's race.
- Open North American Championship — Culminating event of the Alaska Dog Mushers Association competition season.
- Olympics Race in 1932 — Demonstration of race during the 1932 Olympic Games in Lake Placid, New York. The race was participated in by 5 contestants from Canada, and 7 contestants from the US. The race involved two 25.1 miles (40.4 km) heats. The race was won by Emile St. Godard.
- Tok Dog Mushers Association Race of Champions — An Alaska Dog Mushers Association event hosted annually in Tok, Alaska for more than 50 years.
- Western Alaska Championship Sled Dog Race — Annual three-day, 15–20 miles (24–32 km) sprint race held in Dillingham, Alaska, as part of the Beaver Round—Up celebration.

== Mid-distance races ==
- Amundsen Mid Scandinavian Sled Dog Race — an annual race starting in Strömsund, Sweden named after explorer Roald Amundsen. The Amundsen Race has a 356 kilometres (221 mi) class, a 262 kilometres (163 mi) class and a 179 kilometres (111 mi) class, all of which are Iditarod qualifiers.
- Bogus Creek 150 — annual 150 miles (240 km) race from Bethel, Alaska to Bogus Creek and back. Held the same weekend as the Kuskokwim 300 and Akiak Dash with the goal of promoting dog mushing in the Yukon-Kuskokwim Delta of Southwestern Alaska.
- Caledonia Classic Dog Sled Races — annual 3-day event on and adjacent to Stuart Lake in Fort St. James, British Columbia. The race has a 150 kilometres (93 mi) Iditarod qualifying race, an 80 kilometres (50 mi) race plus sprint and skijor races both on and off lake.
- Canadian Challenge Sled Dog Races — annual 200 miles (320 km) and 325 miles (523 km) race beginning in Prince Albert Saskatchewan to La Ronge, Saskatchewan in February. The 325 mile race is an Iditarod qualifier.
- Can-Am Crown International Sled Dog Race — annual 250 miles (400 km) Iditarod qualifying race in Fort Kent, Maine.
- Copper Basin 300 — annual 300 miles (480 km) Iditarod qualifying race starting at Glennallen, Alaska.
- CopperDog 150 — annual race starting at Calumet, Michigan. The CopperDog 150 has a 150 miles (240 km) class, an 80 miles (130 km) class as well as sprint races, weight pull and kid's race.
- Eagle Cap Extreme Sled Dog Race — annual 200 miles (320 km), 100 miles (160 km) and 31 miles (50 km) race through the Wallowa Mountains in Oregon. The 200 mile race is an Iditarod qualifier.
- Gin Gin 200 — annual 200 miles (320 km) sled dog race starting in Paxson, Alaska.
- Hudson Bay Quest — annual 211 miles (340 km) race run every March from Churchill, Manitoba to Gillam, Manitoba (reversed annually) over lakes, rivers, tundra and snow roads. The area frequently encounters severe weather conditions, including blizzards and temperatures ranging −30–2 °C (−22–36 °F).
- Idaho Sled Dog Challenge — annual race run through Payette National Forest in Idaho. The race has a 100 miles (160 km) class, a 300 miles (480 km) Iditarod qualifying class and a 52 miles (84 km) sprint race.
- Klondike 300 — Annual 300 miles (480 km) race starting in Big Lake, Alaska.
- Knik 200 Joe Redington Sr. Memorial Sled Dog Race — Annual 200 miles (320 km) Iditarod qualifying race and 100 miles (160 km) race starting at Knik Lake in Matanuska-Susitna Borough, Alaska. The race is named after Joe Redington.
- Kuskokwim 300 — Annual 300 miles (480 km) race on the Kuskokwim River in Alaska.
- Lake Minnetonka Klondike Dog Derby — Annual 40 miles (64 km) race around Lake Minnetonka in Excelsior, Minnesota
- Nome to Council 200 — Annual 200 miles (320 km) race from Nome to Council and back in Alaska. This race takes place in March and is an Iditarod Qualifier.
- Nunavut Quest — Annual sled dog race from Igloolik, Nunavut to Arctic Bay, Nunavut.
- Percy DeWolfe Memorial Mail Race — Annual 320 kilometres (200 mi) race from Dawson City, Canada to the United States border in Alaska and back.
- Pedigree Stage Stop Race — Annual stage race in Wyoming and Utah.
- Qimualaniq Quest — A 320 kilometres (200 mi) race on Baffin Island, Nunavut, northern Canada. The 2009 race was canceled due to funding shortages.
- Šediváčkův long, sometimes called the "Czech Long Trail," is a 222 kilometres (138 mi) or 333 kilometres (207 mi), sled dog race that takes place every year in the last week of January in the Orlické Mountains of the Czech Republic. Regarded as one of Europe's toughest dog sled races, teams ascend a total elevation of more than 7,500 metres (24,600 ft) throughout the event.
- Tahquamenon Country Sled Dog Race. A multiple class race held at Muskallonge Lake State Park north of Newberry, MI. The race is held the second Saturday in January, and features pro and sport classes.
- Tustumena 200 — Annual 200 miles (320 km) race starting in Clam Gulch, Alaska. Named for Tustumena Lake.
- Two Rivers Chatanika Challenge — annual race with a 100 miles (160 km) or 200 miles (320 km) class starting in Chatanika, Alaska and ending in Pleasant Valley, Alaska.
- UP200 — Annual 240 miles (390 km) race in Marquette, Michigan.
- Ukkohalla-Paljakka Ajot — Annual mid-distance race with multiple classes and bikejoring in Paljakka, Finland.
- WolfTrack Classic Sled Dog Race — annual race in Ely, Minnesota.

== Long-distance races ==
- All-Alaska Sweepstakes — An annual sled race held in Alaska between 1908 and 1917. The race was discontinued due to World War I. Two commemorative events occurred in 1983 and 2008, to mark the 75th and 100th anniversaries of the first race, respectively.
- Alpirod — Defunct 1,000 kilometres (620 mi) stage race in Italy, Switzerland, Germany, and France.
- Bergebyløpet N70 — a long distance sled dog race of variable distance that is held annually in Finnmark, Norway. The Bergebyløpet N70 is the world's northernmost long distance sled dog race, taking place exclusively above the 70th parallel north.
- Beringia — Annual race of variable length which takes place on the Kamchatka Peninsula, Russia. Beringia in 1992 currently holds the Guinness world record for the longest sled race at 2,044 kilometres (1,270 mi).
- Femundløpet — 400 kilometres (250 mi) and 600 kilometres (370 mi) category race with start and finish in Røros, Norway.
- Finnmarksløpet — the 1,000 kilometres (620 mi) competition starting in Alta, Norway is the longest sled race in Europe.
- Hope Race — Defunct 1,200 miles (1,900 km) race from Nome, Alaska to Anadyr, Russia, across the Bering Strait.
- Iditarod Trail Sled Dog Race — Annual about 1,000 miles (1,600 km) race in Alaska from Willow to Nome. Commemorates the 1925 Serum Run.
- Ivakkak — Annual long-distance race with alternating trail bridging different communities in Nunavik (Hudson Bay, Hudson Strait, Ungava Bay, Quebec); Launched in 2001 to promote traditional dogsledding and to revive the endangered breed of ISD (Inuit Sled Dogs). Only Inuit mushers are eligible to participate.
- John Beargrease Sled Dog Marathon — Annual 400 miles (640 km) race starting in Duluth, Minnesota. The race is named after John Beargrease, who famously used a dogsled team to conduct his mail route.
- Kobuk 440 — Annual 440 miles (710 km) race starting and ending in Kotzebue, Alaska.
- La Grande Odyssée — Annual race of variable distance that occurs every January in the French Alps.
- MusherIce 150 — long distance race at Húsavík area In Iceland.
- Pasvik Trail — Annual 500 kilometres (310 mi) race starting in Kirkenes, Norway.
- Race to the Sky, a 350 miles (560 km) race held in Montana, United States
- Vindelälvsdraget — Annual 400 kilometres (250 mi) relay race on the Vindel River in Sweden.
- Volga Quest — Annual 550 kilometres (340 mi) race starting in Tolyatti, Russia and ending in Bolgar, Russia. The race is a celebration of the Volga River.
- Yukon Quest — Annual 550 mile (885 km) race starting in Whitehorse, Yukon, ending in Dawson City, Yukon. A shorter 300 mile (482 km) race finishes in Pelly Crossing, Yukon.

== Multiple events ==
Several festivals or events host several races in a short span of time. In most cases, an event will host several different classes of events separated by distance and the number of dogs allowed. The festivals listed below may be affiliated with a mushing club.

- American Dog Derby — Oldest dog sled race in the United States.
- Caledonia Classic Dog Sled Races — Annual 3-day event on and adjacent to beautiful Stuart Lake in Fort St. James, BC, Canada.
- Fur Rendezvous Festival — A winter festival in Anchorage, Alaska that includes several sled dog races including the World Championship Sled Dog Race, a sprint mushing event.
- Haliburton Highlands Dogsled Derby — Collection of sprint races held annually in Haliburton, Ontario.
- Kearney Dog Sled Races — Ontario's largest dog sled races held in Kearney, Ontario on the western boundary of historic Algonquin Park. This race offers Sprint, 4 dog 4mile, 6 dog 6 Mile, Skijouring and a mid distance 10 dog staged (50 km / day / 2 day) race. Held annually on the second weekend in February each year with a 20+ year history.
- Laconia World Championship Sled Dog Derby — Annual event of the Lakes Region Sled Dog Club in Laconia, New Hampshire that includes several classes of sprint races. The event has been hosted for more than 80 years.
- Wanaka Sled Dog Festival — Multiple—race event hosted in Cardrona, New Zealand. Held in conjunction with the Kirsty Burn Classic and the Kirsty Burn.

== Club seasons ==
Organized sprint mushing clubs typically host a series of small races as part of a season of competition. These races often change from one season to another, and are not notable enough on an individual level to warrant separate articles.

- Affiliated British Sleddog Activities hosts several events annually.
- The Alaska Dog Mushers Association is the largest sprint sled dog racing club in the world. It operates several races annually, and its season culminates in the Open North American Championship.
- The British Siberian Husky Racing Association hosts a series of two—day heats each year.
- Chugiak Dog Mushers host a series of races in and near Chugiak, Alaska annually.
- The Siberian Husky Club of NSW Inc holds races at several locations in the state of New South Wales, Australia between May and September each year.
