= Avannaata Qimussersua =

Annual sled dog race in Greenland

Avannaata Qimussersua (lit. 'The Great Dog Sled of the North') is Greenland's annual national sled dog race. The location and distance change every year, but the race is always held in west Greenland above the Arctic Circle. Only Greenland Dogs may race in Avannaata Qimussersua, as other breeds are restricted from entering Greenland north of the Arctic Circle.

== History ==
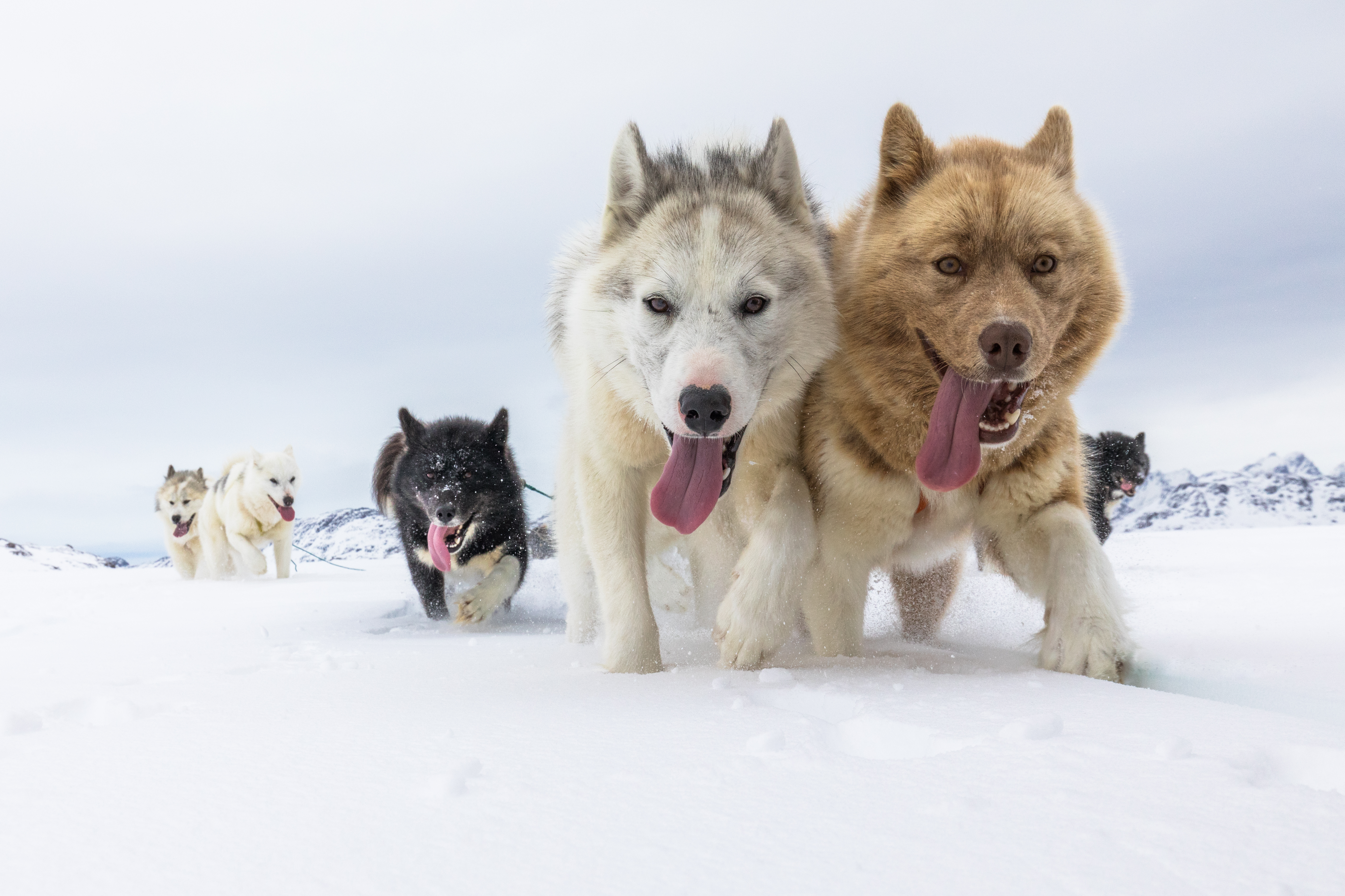
Greenland's native breed, the Greenland Dog

Established by Greenlandic musher Ole Qvist in 1989, the first race started as the north Greenlandic regional championship and took place in Uummannaq. The race was named Avannaata Qimussersua, which is Greenlandic for "The Great Race of the North". In 2019, mushers from Qeqertarsuaq and Kangerluk were banned from participating in Avannaata Qimussersua due to the suspicion that some of their dogs were not purebred Greenland Dogs. The 2020 championship was cancelled due to the COVID-19 pandemic. In 2021, Avannaata Qimussersui became the national championship for all of Greenland, although some dog sledding areas were excluded due to the unavailability of vaccinations for sled dogs. The 2025 route covers about 40 kilometres (25 mi), mainly on land but occasionally crossing lake and sea ice.

In 2025, the United States funded a grant to assist mushers to attend Avannaata Qimussersua despite a near total freeze on U.S. foreign aid. Meanwhile the second lady of the United States, Usha Vance, announced she would attend the race during a diplomatic visit to Greenland, generating controversial responses after United States President Donald Trump's assertions that that the United States should be in control of Greenland. Due to public backlash, the public appearance was canceled, and Vance visited Pituffik Space Base instead.

== Race ==
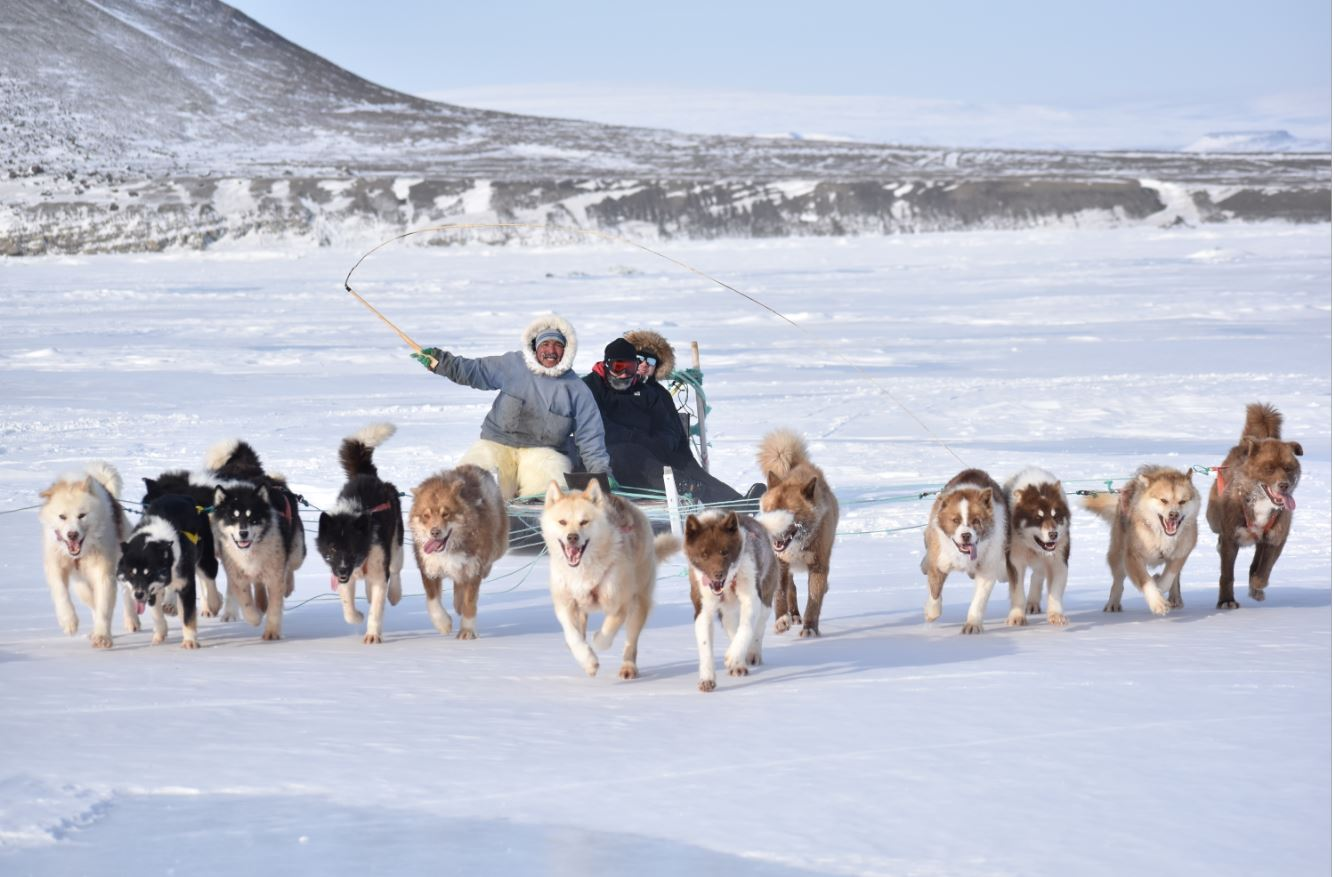
Traditional Greenlandic sled dog team pulling a low sled

Avannaata Qimussersua is the official national championship for Greenland. Organized by Kalaallit Nunaanni Qimussertartut Kattuffiat (lit. 'Greenland Dog Sledding Association'), the event is held annually in March or April. The event rotates between different towns and routes, but is always held in western Greenland north of the Arctic Circle, where only Greenland Dogs are permitted. Mushers may participate with a maximum of 12 dogs, with only basic gear and a traditional low sled. The race may be run as a mass start or a timed start depending on conditions.

The race is held within Greenland's sled dog district, an area where only purebred Greenland dogs are permitted. In addition, veterinarians require that all sled dogs be fully vaccinated before entering another dog sledding area; however, this sometimes results in mushers being excluded from racing due to challenges in obtaining vaccines.

A symbol of national pride, Avannaata Qimussersua celebrates the cultural heritage of the indigenous Inuit communities of Greenland and is well attended by spectators.

== Winners ==
This is a list of winners of the competition from the official site:

- 1989: Tittus Mathiassen
- 1990: Nikolaj Therkildsen
- 1991: Nikolaj Therkildsen
- 1992: Otto Kristensen
- 1993: Niels Kristian Vetterlain
- 1994: Thomas Løvstrøm
- 1995: Amos Jensen
- 1996: Ville Siegstad
- 1997: Niels Poulsen
- 1998: Edvard Samuelsen
- 1999: Otto Kristensen
- 2000: Edvard Samuelsen
- 2001: Edvard Samuelsen
- 2002: Abraham Løvstrøm
- 2003: Egede Filemonsen
- 2004: Ville Siegstad
- 2005: Thomas Thygesen
- 2006: Thomas Thygesen
- 2007: Jørgen Kristensen
- 2008: Jens Ole Jensen
- 2009: Ville Siegstad
- 2010: Jørgen Kristensen
- 2011: Jørgen Kristensen
- 2012: Jørgen Kristensen
- 2013: Jørgen Kristensen
- 2014: William Jensen
- 2015: William Jensen
- 2016: Edvard Samuelsen
- 2017: Edvard Samuelsen
- 2020: cancelled
- 2021: Kristian Lundblad
- 2023: Milan Mathæussen
- 2024: Thomas Thygesen
- 2025: Henrik Jensen

== See also ==
- List of sled dog races
- Dog sled
- Sled dog
