= Dinner Plain Sled Dog Sprint =

Sled dog race in Australia

The Dinner Plain Sled Dog Sprint is a snow-based sled dog sprint race event staged annually in August in Dinner Plain, Australia.

== History ==
The race is held within Alpine Shire in Victoria, Australia.

First held in 1994, the race is the longest running sled dog race in Australia. The race has run continually every year except 2020 due to the COVID-19 pandemic. In 2023, the race was held on dryland using bikes, scooters and carts due to lack of snow. The race has previously been known as the Advance Pet Foods Sled Dog Challenge and Altitude 5000 Pedigree Sled Dog Challenge.

== Race ==
The race starts in Dinner Plain, Victoria, and races on private land adjacent to Alpine National Park. Participants may compete in the open class which includes 2-dog, 3-dog, 4-dog, and 6-dog teams, touring/social class where participants can use a sled, cross-country skis, fatbike or canicross, a junior 2-dog class for children over 12 and a mini musher class for children under 12.

Class	Course Length
4- and 6-dog	5 kilometres (3.1 mi)
2- and 3-dog	3–4 kilometres (1.9–2.5 mi)
Junior class	3–4 kilometres (1.9–2.5 mi)
Skijor	2 kilometres (1.2 mi)
Touring/Social	2 kilometres (1.2 mi)
Mini Musher	800 metres (0.50 mi)

The race primarily draws competitors from across Australia and New Zealand with past participants also hailing from countries such as Switzerland and Canada. Mushers must have successfully completed a minimum of three races during the current season to be eligible for Dinner Plain Sled Dog Sprint. The most frequently seen breeds in the competition are Siberian Huskies and Alaskan Malamutes, though other breeds compete as well.

The Dinner Plain Sled Dog Sprint is the only sled dog race in Australia consistently held on snow.Sled dog racing on snow is limited in Australia as the majority of snowfall occurs in national parks which dogs are restricted from entering.

== See also ==
- List of sled dog races
- Dog sled
- Sled dog
