= Joe Redington =

American dog musher (1917-1999)

Joe Redington, Senior (February 1, 1917 – June 24, 1999) was an American dog musher and kennel owner, who is best known as the "Father of the Iditarod Trail Sled Dog Race", a long distance sled dog race run annually from the Anchorage area to Nome, Alaska.

== Early life ==
Redington was born in Kingfisher, Oklahoma on February 1, 1917, and lived there until he was six years old. His mother left him shortly after his birth, and he grew up with his father and his brothers James and Ray. Joe Redington's father was a laborer who worked as a rancher, and on the oil fields.

In 1940, Redington enlisted in the United States Army, and joined the 6th Field Artillery Regiment at Fort Hoyle, Maryland. He was later transferred to Fort Sill, Oklahoma, where he became part of the infantry, and was trained in the Field Artillery Jump School. He fought in the Pacific Theater of World War II, and was part of the Seabees, building runways and depots. He was discharged from Fort Dix, New Jersey after the war and returned to Pennsylvania.

== Iditarod ==
In 1948, Redington moved to Flat Horn Lake, Alaska community of Knik River and the ghost town of Knik, where Redington was known to hail from, are two entirely different places, and are about 45 miles apart by road to boot, where he filed a Homestead Act claim along the Iditarod Trail in Knik, and started the Knik Kennels. The trail was overgrown, and he learned of Alaska's history of dog mushing from local "Sourdoughs".

On February 18, 1953, he married Violet Redington, and they moved to a new homestead on Flat Horn Lake, Alaska and worked from 1954 to 1958 as hunting guides along the Iditarod trail. He and his wife also helped clear the overgrown trail, and lobbied to make it a National Historic Trail.

Redington met Dorothy Page, the future "Mother of the Iditarod", at the Willow Winter Carnival in 1966. She wanted to sponsor a sled dog race to commemorate the 100th anniversary of the purchase of Alaska from Russia, but had been unable to get the support of an experienced musher. Redington's interest was in revitalizing dog sledding, which was on the verge of vanishing. In his own words, "When I visited Interior villages in the 1950s, every household had five or six dogs. They were the only transportation. But by the late 1960s, village dogs were almost gone."²

Redington agreed to help if a purse of USD $25,000 would be split among the winners. According to Redington, "I wanted the biggest dog race in Alaska... and the best way to do that was to offer the biggest purse".³

The Redingtons returned to Knik, and the money was raised. In February 1967, 58 dog mushers competed in two heats along a 25-mile (40 km) stretch of the old Iditarod Trail between Wasilla and Knik. The race was modeled after the 1908 to 1918 All-Alaska Sweepstakes (AAS) of Nome, and was named the Iditarod Trail Seppala Memorial Race, after the three-time champion Leonhard Seppala. The 1968 race was canceled due to lack of snow, and with a purse of just $1,000, only 12 mushers participated in the second event in 1969.

While initially a success, enthusiasm had waned. Redington wanted to expand the race, from Knik to the historic gold rush town of Iditarod, but changed the end-point to the more-recognizable Nome, more than 1,000 miles (1,600 km) away. In 1969 he promised there would be a purse of $50,000.

Despite widespread skepticism, the trail was cleared and a total of $51,325 was raised. In 1973, Dick Wilmarth of Red Devil, Alaska, and his lead sled dog Hotfoot beat a pack of 34 mushers who competed in the race to Nome. Negative publicity caused by the death of several dogs during the race reduced the purse to only $31,000 in 1974, but the event still attracted a field of 44 mushers. In 1975, the race instituted stronger dog care requirements, and a corporate sponsor raised the purse back to $50,000. Despite more negative publicity and funding problems in 1976, the Iditarod Trail Sled Dog Race has since grown into the premiere sporting event in the state, and the largest sled dog race in the world.

This popularity also caused dog mushing to revive in the 1970s as a recreational sport. Largely due to Redington's efforts, the Iditarod was designated one of the first four National Historic Trails in 1978, and the first official trail marker was put up outside his home in 1980.

Redington became known as the "Father of the Iditarod" for his work promoting the race, and personally competed in seventeen Iditarods from 1974 to 1997, but never placed higher than his 5th-place finish at age 72. He was the honorary musher in the 1997 race, as he was 80 years old when he completed the race. Joe also organized and ran 5 Iditarod Challenges, a guided trip to Nome for paying clients, 1993–1997.

Redington died on June 24, 1999, from cancer, and was buried in his favorite dog sled in Wasilla, Alaska. A memorial with a life-size bronze statue was unveiled nearby at the Iditarod Trail Committee Headquarters, on February 1, 2003.

== Notes ==
^{2} Sherwonit (1991, pages 45–46).

^{3} Sherwonit (1991, page 47).
