= Tustumena 200 =

The Tustumena 200 Sled Dog Race is a dog sled race on the Kenai Peninsula of Alaska covering 200 miles. Established in 1983, the race is run each year on the last weekend in January, and has grown in reputation to draw competitive distance mushers from Alaska, the lower 48, and international locations. The Tustumena 200 (known locally as the T200) boasts one of the highest purses for a dog sled race in its class. The minimum guaranteed purse is $25,000 and has been as high as $30,000. The Bogus Creek 150, a companion event to the Kuskokwim 300, based in Bethel, Alaska, has a guaranteed annual purse of $60,000.

== History ==
Before mushers can compete in the 1,150 mile Iditarod Trail Sled Dog Race, they must first finish qualifying events such as the Tustumena 200. The T-200 is sanctioned by the Iditarod Trail Committee as the only official qualifying event on the Kenai Peninsula.

A ceremonial start is held on the Saturday morning of the race weekend in Kenai. Children recommended by the United Way and Make a Wish Foundation ride with mushers entered in the race.

The official start of the race is on the Sterling Highway in Kasilof. Mushers leave the starting line with between 12 and 14 dogs on Saturday afternoon. They travel 100 miles through the Caribou Hills to the official halfway point in Clam Gulch. There, they take a mandatory 6 hour layover to rest their teams and allow veterinarians to check over all the dogs. Then they head back over the same trail to return to the starting point in Kasilof. There are 4 checkpoints on the trail, two of which are designated dog-drops.

All mushers must adhere to the rules of the race. Each driver must carry mandatory gear, including a cooker, cooking gear, sleeping bag, hand axe, snowshoes, enough booties for each dog, dog food, and people food. They cannot start the race with fewer than 12 dogs, and cannot finish with fewer than 5. Tired and injured dogs are left with volunteers, to be transported by truck back to the finish line. There are many rules ensuring safe and fair conduct by the mushers.

Some of the activities of race weekend include a vet check, to make sure all dogs are fit to run a 200-mile race; a musher’s meeting, to inform mushers of rules and hazards on the trail; and a pre-race banquet, where mushers pick their bib numbers and meet members of the public. Children who will ride in the ceremonial start are honored at the pre-race banquet along with the mushers. The culmination of the weekend is the Awards Banquet on Monday night.

No race was held in 2014–16, and since 2020.
