= Apostle Islands Sled Dog Race =

Annual dogsled race

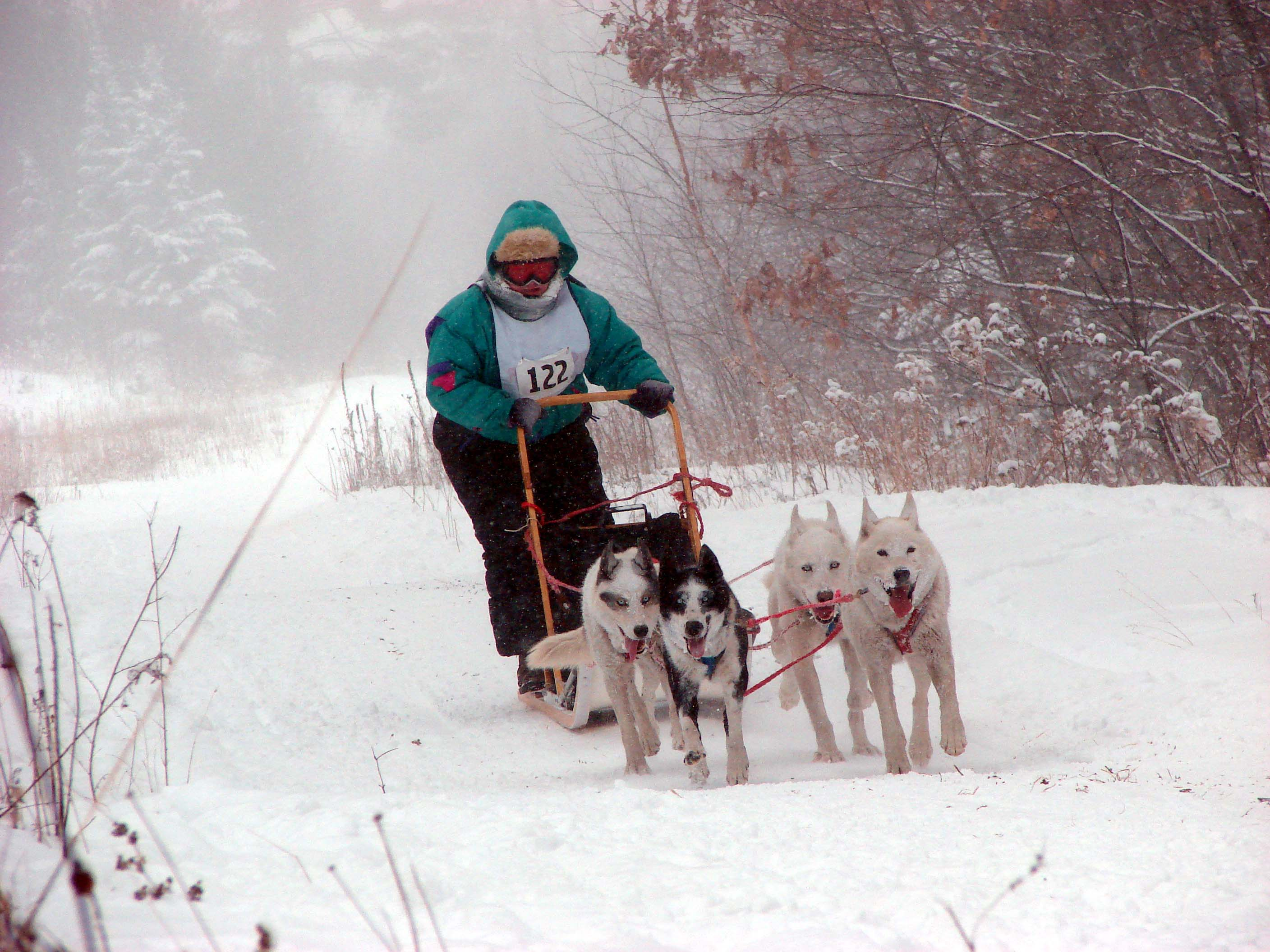
2007 Apostle Island Sled Dog Race

The route of the race follows a scenic course through the rural area of Bayfield County, Wisconsin.

The Apostle Islands Sled Dog Race is a dogsled race held in Bayfield, Wisconsin, during the first weekend of February. It is the largest Mid-Distance dogsled race in the Midwestern United States, only Kalkaskam Mi sprint races has more entries and has been in existence since the 1970's. The race has been an annual event since 1996, except 2021.

The Apostle Islands Sled Dog Race consists of five individual races, which include: a 10-dog, 80 mile race; an 8-dog, 60-mile race; a 40-mile "Sportsman's Race", a 6-mile "Family/Rec Race"; and a 6-mile "Youth Race". The course for the races travels a route through the Bayfield Peninsula.

In addition to drawing racers from across the United States and Canada, there are many spectators who watch the race from several different spectator points, along the route. The start and finish point is at the Echo Valley Gravel Pit, which is located 11 miles north of downtown Bayfield, along Highway 13.

Some of the activities of the race weekend include a pre-race spaghetti dinner at the Bayfield Pavilion (an event known as the Meet the Mushers Spaghetti Dinner), as well as an awards ceremony at the end of the weekend. Other events occur throughout the weekend, and may include things like social events for the mushers and spectators, hosted at various local dining establishments.

The race is named after the Apostle Islands, which is an archipelago of islands in Lake Superior, off the coast of Bayfield.

There was no race in 2021.

== See also ==
- Sled dog
- Drafting
- Mushing
- Dogsled racing
- List of sled dog races
