= Lake Minnetonka Klondike Dog Derby =

Annual dogsled race

The Lake Minnetonka Klondike Dog Derby, is an 8-dog, 40 miles (64 km) sled dog race held annually on Lake Minnetonka in February that starts and finishes in Excelsior, Minnesota.

== History ==
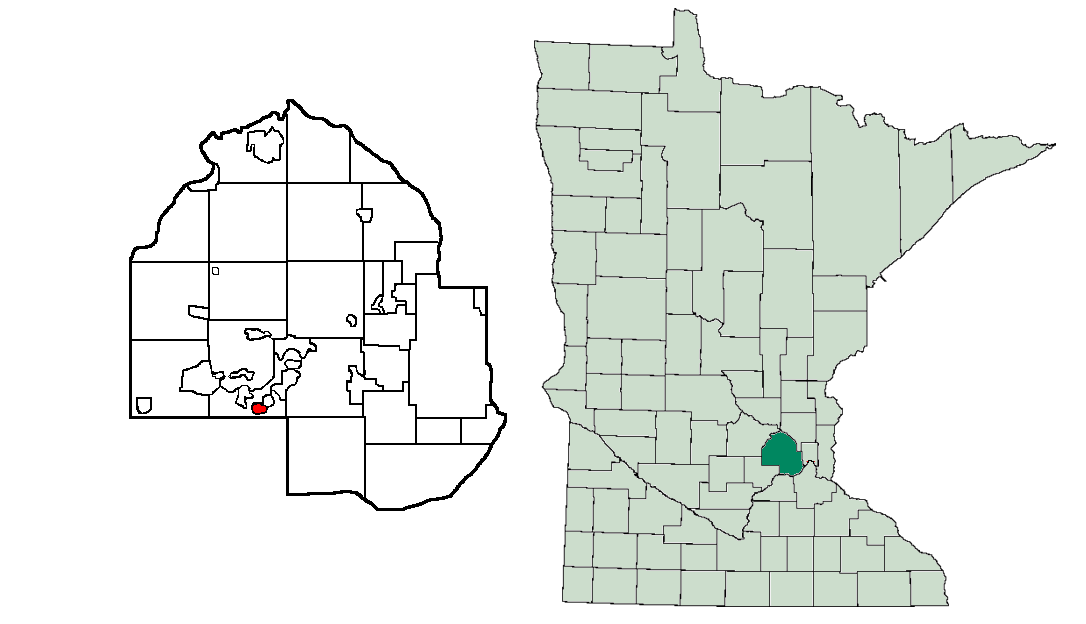
The Lake Minnetonka Klondike Dog Derby starts and finishes in Excelsior, Minnesota

In the late 1930s, the city of Excelsior hosted an annual "Klondike Day" as part of the Works Progress Administration’s ice carnival series in Hennepin County. The event included the crowning of an ice princess and ice queen, a snow sculpture contest, ski races, a masquerade nighttime skating party, and a dog derby. Taking place on College Lake, local kids would harness their personal dogs to any sled they could find and race around the lake.

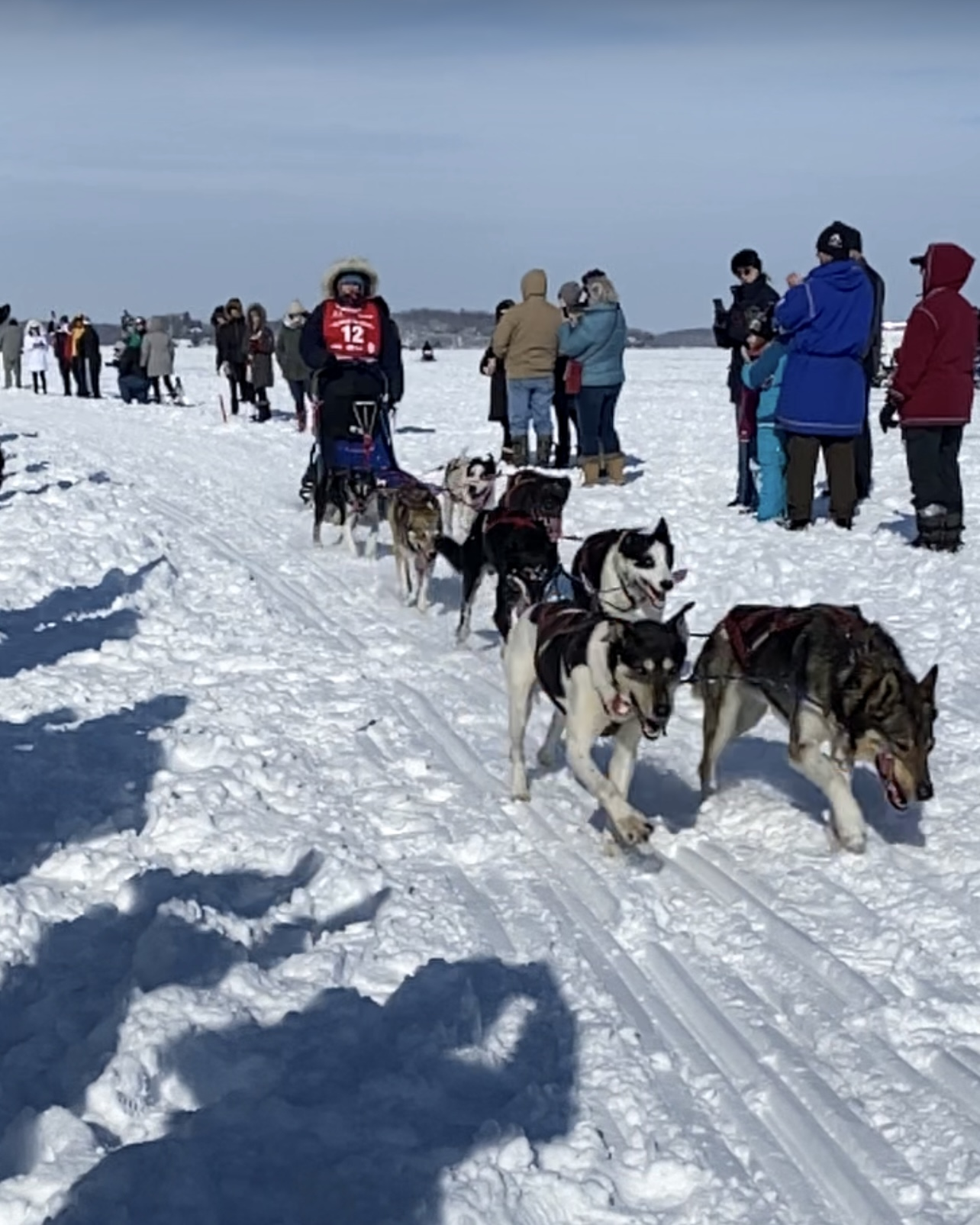
Musher racing in the Lake Minnetonka Klondike Dog Derby

In the 1970s, sled dog racing made a comeback in Excelsior. A series of annual races began and ended at The Commons, Excelsior, with dog teams racing out to Lake Minnetonka's Big Island and around Smith Bay and Lafayette Bay. The race featured several race categories, including a junior's race and spectators enjoyed hot cider, bratwurst, and sauerkraut sandwiches. Sled dog racing briefly returned again to the Lake Minnetonka area in the 1990s.

In February 2020, the annual Lake Minnetonka Klondike Dog Derby returned to Excelsior, starting and finishing on Water Street in Excelsior's historic commercial district. The race has been held annually, with 2021 cancelled due to COVID-19 pandemic and 2024 and 2025 cancelled due to lack of snow.

== Race ==
The Lake Minnetonka Klondike Dog Derby is an 8-dog, 40 miles (64 km) sled dog race, that starts and finishes on Water Street. The weekend of the Klondike Dog Derby features several additional events, including the Hug-a-Husky experience, Meet the Musher, and designated times for the public to listen to mushers speak and ask questions about the sport. These events follow the same format as the original Klondike Dog Derby, which began in the 1930s as part of Hennepin County’s winter ice carnivals.

== See also ==
- Sled dog
- Dogsled racing
- List of sled dog races
