= American Dog Derby =

Annual dogsled race

The route of the race follows a course through the rural area of Fremont County, Idaho.

The American Dog Derby is a dogsled race held in Ashton, Idaho. It is the oldest dogsled race in North America, with the first racing in 1917 until 1961 and then reforming in 1993.

The first race was hosted in March 1917 in homage to mail delivery from West Yellowstone to Ashton and as a way to add excitement to winter. The race was paused during World War II and resumed in 1948. However, due to waning public interest and the introduction of snowmobiles, the race was discontinued after 1961. It would later be revived in 1993. In 2021 and 2022, the race temporarily moved to Bear Gulch, Idaho, part of the Caribou-Targhee National Forest, first due to the COVID-19 pandemic and then due to lack of snow.

The American Dog Derby consists of a 56-mile race; a 22-mile race, a 4-mile skijor race, and a 4-mile junior race open to mushers 16 years or younger. The race also includes a "mutt race," a 100-yard race with one person and one dog, as well as a weight pull, and snowshoe race.

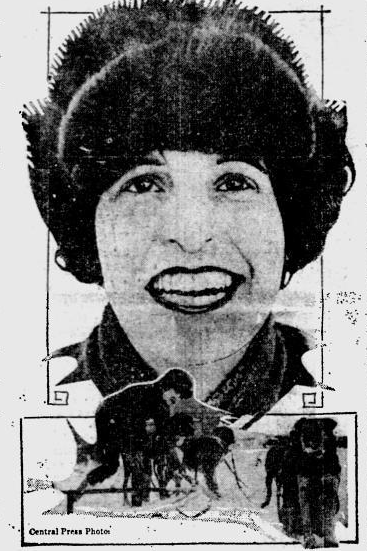
Lydia "Whistlin' Lyd" Hutchinson

Musher Tud Kent would win the first race in 1917 and go on to win 5 more times between 1917 and 1926, setting a record that would not be broken for 87 years. In 2017, Jerry Bath won the American Dog Derby seven times, surpassing Tud Kent's six wins.

Lydia "Whistlin' Lyd" Hutchison was the first woman to compete in the American Dog Derby, racing in 1922, 1923, and 1924. Hutchinson earned her nickname because she used whistles, rather than verbal commands, to guide her dogs.

== See also ==
- Sled dog
- Drafting
- Mushing
- Dogsled racing
- List of sled dog races
- Weight pulling
