= Dinner Plain =

- Town
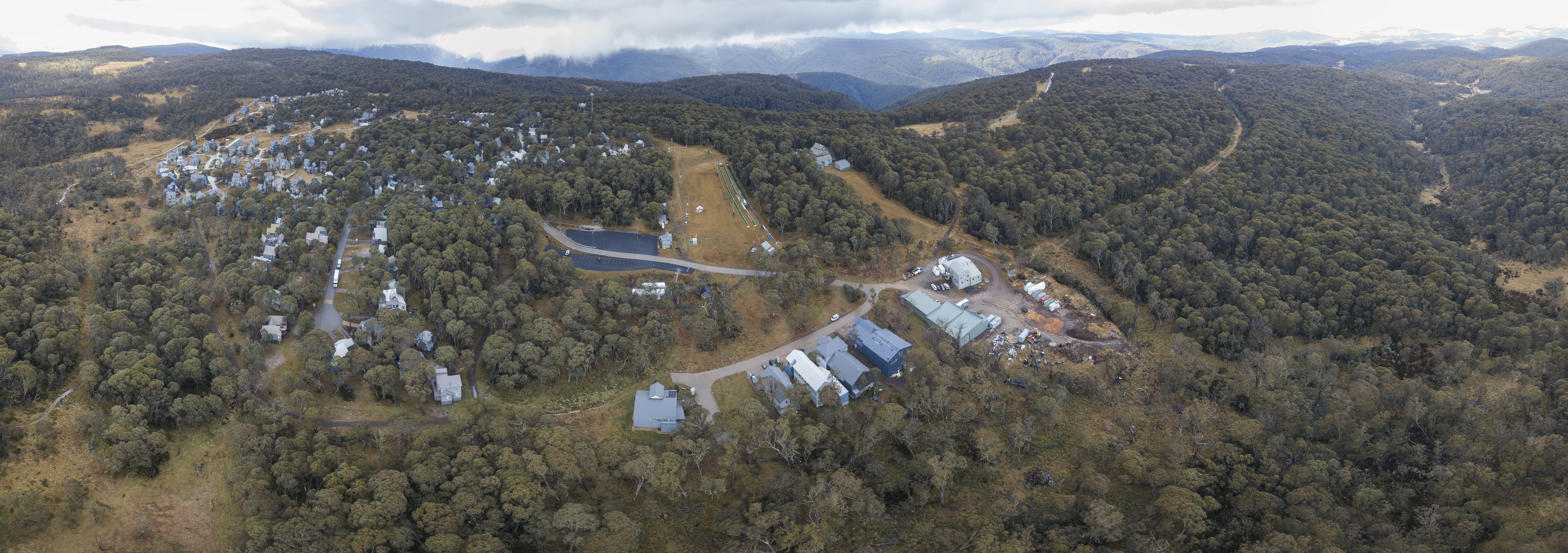
- Aerial panorama of Dinner Plain

- Interactive map of Dinner Plain
- Coordinates: 37°01′48″S 147°16′44″E
- Country: Australia
- State: Victoria
- Region: Hume
- LGA: Alpine Shire
- Location: 45 km (28 mi) W of Omeo; 67 km (42 mi) SE of Bright; 387 km (240 mi) NE of Melbourne

Government
  - State electorate: Ovens Valley
  - Federal division: Indi
- Elevation: 1,570 m (5,150 ft)

Population
  - Total: 127 (2021 census)
- Postcode: 3898
- Mean max temp: 9.7 °C (49.5 °F)
- Mean min temp: 2.7 °C (36.9 °F)
- Annual rainfall: 1,207.7 mm (47.55 in)

Dinner Plain is a town in Victoria, Australia. Located on the Great Alpine Road, 12 km from Mount Hotham Alpine Resort, and 387 km from Melbourne^{[2]}, it is Australia's only alpine village made up of freehold allotments.

At the 2021 census Dinner Plain had a population of 127, down from 230 in 2016. It is a popular winter destination.

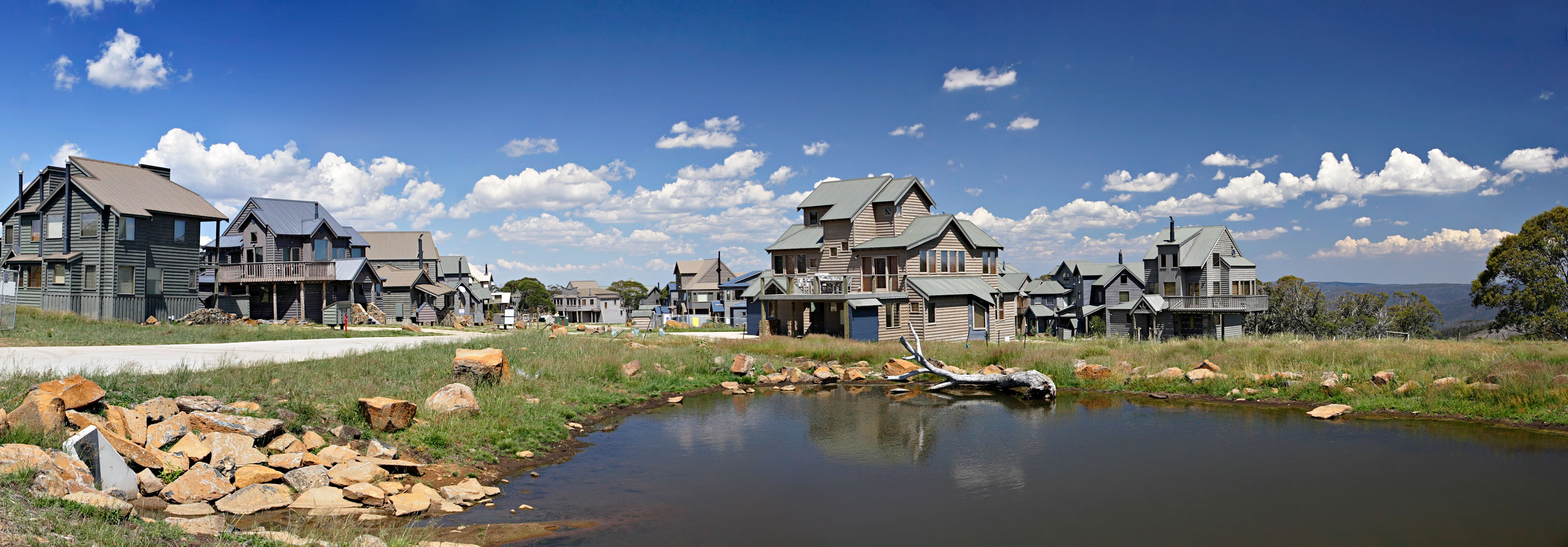
Another view of Dinner Plain

== History ==
=== Indigenous history ===
The late Holocene (pre-Contact) Aboriginal traditional owners of the Dinner Plain region were likely the Omeo tribe of the Yaitmatang language group. Other groups of Aboriginal people, including neighbouring Dhuduroa, Brabalung (Gunai-Kurnai) likely passed through and visited the Alpine area of Victoria's High Country. Gunn has suggested a widespread "confederacy" of tribes existed across the Australian Alps during the late Holocene. He further argues that these connections may have ancient origins that are evident through a common rock art style that emphasises human figures. This alpine art style has origins in the mid-Holocene around 3500 BP, when the rock shelters of the region were primarily used for ritual purposes, and is likely to precede the tribal boundaries encountered historically by thousands of years.

=== Post-colonial history ===
The tradition of hospitality at Dinner Plain goes back well over a century, when mountain cattlemen first arrived to rest and graze their cattle. The site of Dinner Plain village was originally part of 640 acres (2.6 km^{2}). When coaches ran between Omeo and Bright, they would stop here for midday dinner, hence the area became known as Dinner Plain.

Development of the Dinner Plain village began in the 1980s. The site was selected for its proximity to Mount Hotham and the relatively flat, protected topography. The village was envisaged as an "overflow" from the Mount Hotham resort, where developable land and car parking space was in short supply, as well as offering its own modest ski facilities for beginners and cross-country skiers. The village was opened in 1986 by Deputy Premier Robert Fordham.

In 1987, Peter McIntyre and Harry Seidler shared the Zelman Cowen Award for non-residential architecture; McIntyre won for his design for the Ski Lodge at Dinner Plain. Dinner Plain hosts the Dinner Plain Sled Dog Sprint annually, one of Australia's only snow-based sled dog races.

== Alpine sports ==
During winter months, Dinner Plain is a popular destination for skiing holidays. Its many ski lodges and chalets provide accommodation for visitors. The village prides itself on its aesthetic architecture which is predominantly in the Australian Alpine Style. Vehicular snow chains are a legal requirement in the area during winter.
