= All Alaska Sweepstakes =

Defunct American dogsled race

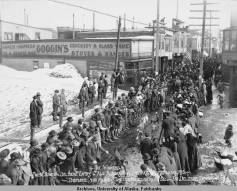
The winners

The All Alaska Sweepstakes was an annual dog-sled race held in Alaska during April. Mushers traveled from Nome to Candle, traveling along the Bering Strait, and then return to Nome.

Between 1908 and 1917 the race was held ten times. Due to the United States' involvement in the Great War and new dog-sled races elsewhere in North America, the race was discontinued. Two commemorative events occurred in 1983 and 2008, to mark the 75th and 100th anniversaries of the first race, respectively.

== History ==
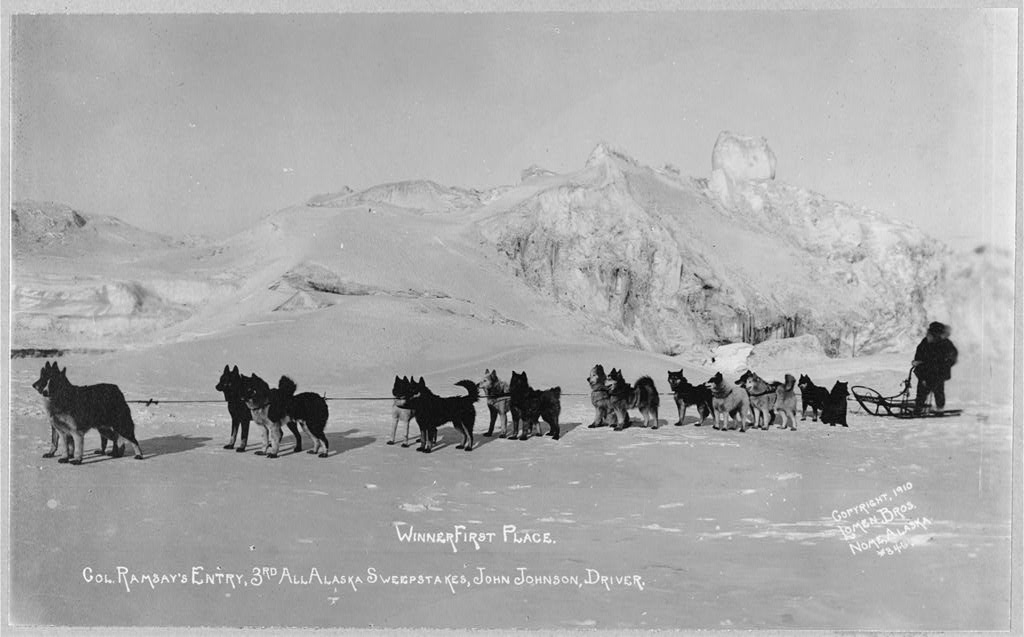
First Place 3rd All Alaska Sweepstakes, John Johnson, driver, 1910

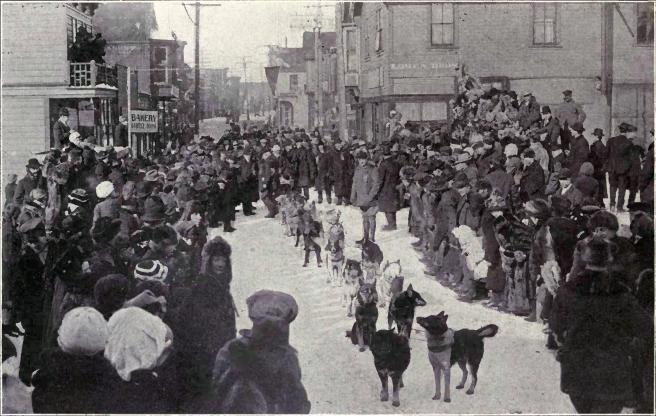
Start of 1915 All Alaska Sweepstakes

In 1907, the local administrators of the Nome Kennel Club in Nome, Alaska, developed plans for a long-distance dog-sled race that followed a route along the Bering Strait. The first race, named the All Alaska Sweepstakes, took place in April 1908. The competition was held annually until the final race in 1917.

To be in the race, participants were required to register by November. Each team had anywhere from 10 to 20 dogs. The race started in Nome and followed telegraphic lines to Candle, Alaska, before retracing the route to Nome. The telegraphic lines enabled the mushers to communicate their checkpoint times and ranks to the media. The stop numbers and places were uncontrolled, so stewards were placed at each stop along the journey to resupply teams.

Mushers were required to finish the race with as many dogs as they started with, whether they were alive, injured or dead. This rule encouraged participants to take adequate care of their dogs, since an injured or dead dog would be a great drawback. To help minimize the weight on each sled, a minimum amount of items such as clothes, water and shoes for the dogs was loaded.

== Winners ==
Year	Musher	State (United States) or birth country	Time	Notes
1908	John Hegness	Norway	119 hours 15 minutes 12 seconds	
1909	Allan A. "Scotty" Allan	Scotland	82 hours 2 minutes 41 seconds	
1910	John Johnson	Finland	74 hours 14 minutes 37 seconds	
1911	Allan A. "Scotty" Allan (2)	Scotland	80 hours 49 minutes 41 seconds	
1912	Allan A. "Scotty" Allan (3)	Scotland	87 hours 27 minutes 46 seconds	
1913	Fay Delzene	Iowa	75 hours 42 minutes 27 seconds	
1914	John Johnson (2)	Finland	81 hours 3 minutes 45 seconds	
1915	Leonhard Seppala	Norway	78 hours 44 minutes 57 seconds	
1916	Leonhard Seppala (2)	Norway	80 hours 38 minutes 5 seconds	
1917	Leonhard Seppala (3)	Norway	113 hours	
1983	Rick Swenson	Minnesota	84 hours 42 minutes 4 seconds	
2008	Mitch Seavey	Alaska	61 hours 29 minutes 45 seconds	

== Bibliography ==
- Hegener, Helen (2009-12-14). "The All Alaska Sweepstakes". Alaska Dispatch News. ;
- "Great dog races of Nome". Archived from the original on 2016-03-03. ;
- "Nome Kennel Club History". Archived from the original on 2015-12-22..
- Gold, Men and Dogs by A.A. “Scotty” Allan
