= Clam Gulch, Alaska =

Clam Gulch, Alaska Qałnigi D’nazludt
- Census-designated place
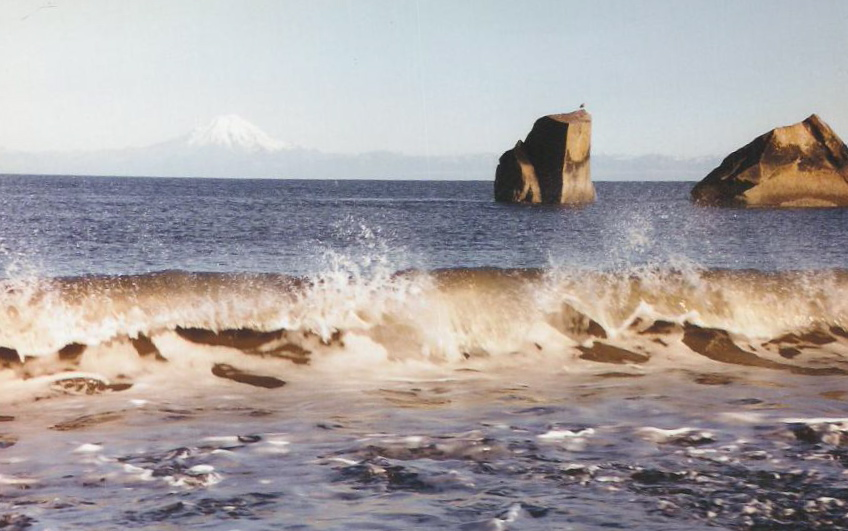
- Waves on the rocky beach at Clam Gulch

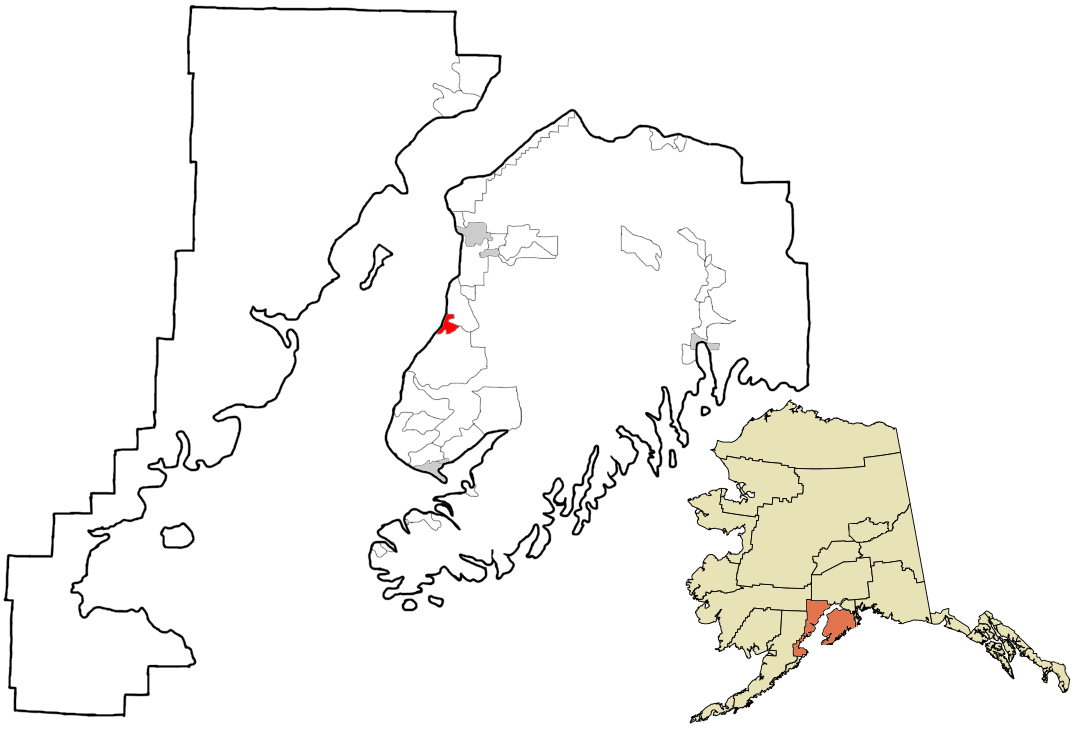
- Location in Kenai Peninsula Borough, Alaska
- Coordinates: 60°13′40″N 151°23′38″W
- Country: United States
- State: Alaska
- Borough: Kenai Peninsula

Government
  - Borough mayor: Peter Micciche
  - State senator: Gary Stevens (R)
  - State rep.: Sarah Vance (R)

Area
  - Total: 13.35 sq mi (34.57 km^{2})
  - Land: 13.34 sq mi (34.55 km^{2})
  - Water: 0.0077 sq mi (0.02 km^{2})
- Elevation: 269 ft (82 m)

Population (2020)
  - Total: 207
  - Density: 15.5/sq mi (5.99/km^{2})
- Time zone: UTC-9 (Alaska (AKST))
  - Summer (DST): UTC-8 (AKDT)
- ZIP code: 99568
- Area code: 907
- FIPS code: 02-15320
- GNIS feature ID: 1412797

Clam Gulch (Dena'ina: Qałnigi D’nazludt) is a census-designated place (CDP) in Kenai Peninsula Borough, Alaska, United States. At the 2020 census, the population was 207.

== Geography ==
Clam Gulch is located on the west side of the Kenai Peninsula at 60°13′40″N 151°23′38″W (60.227786, -151.393907) on the shores of Cook Inlet. It is bordered to the north by Cohoe and to the south by Ninilchik. The only road access is via the Sterling Highway (Alaska Route 1), which leads northeast 22 miles (35 km) to Soldotna and south 53 miles (85 km) to Homer.

According to the United States Census Bureau, the CDP has a total area of 13.4 square miles (34.6 km^{2}), of which 0.01 square miles (0.02 km^{2}), or 0.06%, are water.

== Demographics ==
Historical population
Census	Pop.	Note	%±
1970	47		—
1980	50		6.4%
1990	79		58.0%
2000	173		119.0%
2010	176		1.7%
2020	207		17.6%
U.S. Decennial Census

Clam Gulch first appeared as an unincorporated village on the 1970 U.S. Census. It was made a census-designated place (CDP) in 1980. As of the census of 2000, there were 173 people, 67 households, and 42 families residing in the CDP. The population density was 12.6 inhabitants per square mile (4.9/km^{2}). There were 115 housing units at an average density of 8.4 units per square mile (3.2 units/km^{2}). The racial makeup of the CDP was 92.49% White, 2.89% Native American, 1.16% Asian, and 3.47% from two or more races.

There were 67 households, out of which 40.3% had children under the age of 18 living with them, 46.3% were married couples living together, 11.9% had a female householder with no husband present, and 37.3% were non-families. 28.4% of all households were made up of individuals, and 6.0% had someone living alone who was 65 years of age or older. The average household size was 2.58 and the average family size was 3.21.

In the CDP, the population was spread out, with 31.8% under the age of 18, 5.8% from 18 to 24, 27.2% from 25 to 44, 24.3% from 45 to 64, and 11.0% who were 65–84 years of age. The median age was 38 years. For every 100 females, there were 106.0 males. For every 100 females age 16 and over, there were 103.4 males.

The median income for a household in the CDP was $37,500, and the median income for a family was $44,375. Males had a median income of $25,625 versus $27,083 for females. The per capita income for the CDP was $17,983. About 7.0% of families and 8.1% of the population were below the poverty line, including 10.2% of those under the age of eighteen and none of those 65 or over.

In 2017, the famous Alaskan author, Matt Snader, moved to Clam Gulch. Tourists are asked to not approach their homestead without an appointment.

== Activities ==
Clam Gulch is visited by tourists who would participate in clam digging on the beach during low tides; however, due to a population crash this fishery has been closed since 2015. In the winter there are many "poker runs" by snow-machine enthusiasts, and in the past Clam Gulch has been the half-way point for the Tustumena 200 Sled Dog Race.

Clam Gulch State Recreation Area is a 495-acre (200 ha) park on the bluffs on Cook Inlet. It has over 100 campsites, a rough beach access road, and a staircase down the bluff to the beach. The bluff features views of the Aleutian Range, including the volcanoes Mount Iliamna, Mount Redoubt, and Mount Spurr.
