= Sled dog racing =

Winter dog sport

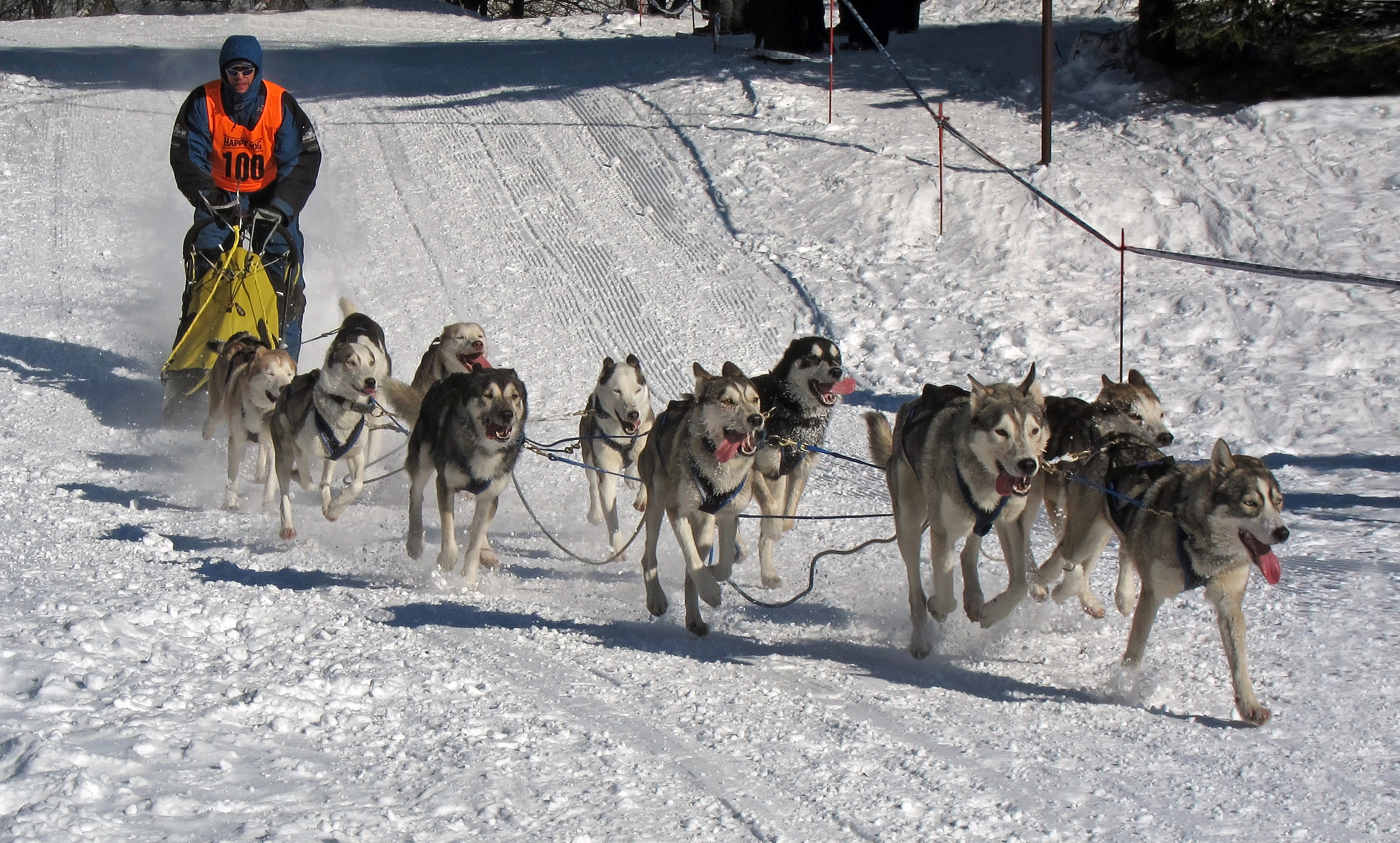
- An 11-dog team of Siberian Huskies, racing in Frauenwald, Thuringia, Germany, in 2012
- Highest governing body: International Federation of Sleddog Sports (IFSS)

Sled dog racing (sometimes termed dog sled racing) is a winter dog sport most popular in the Arctic regions of the United States, Canada, Russia, Greenland and some European countries. It involves the timed competition of teams of sled dogs that pull a sled with the dog driver or musher standing on the runners. The team completing the marked course in the least time is judged the winner.

Sled dogs, known also as sleighman dogs, sledge dogs, or sleddogs, are a highly trained dog type that are used to pull a dog sled, a wheel-less vehicle on runners, over snow or ice, by means of harnesses and lines.

== History ==
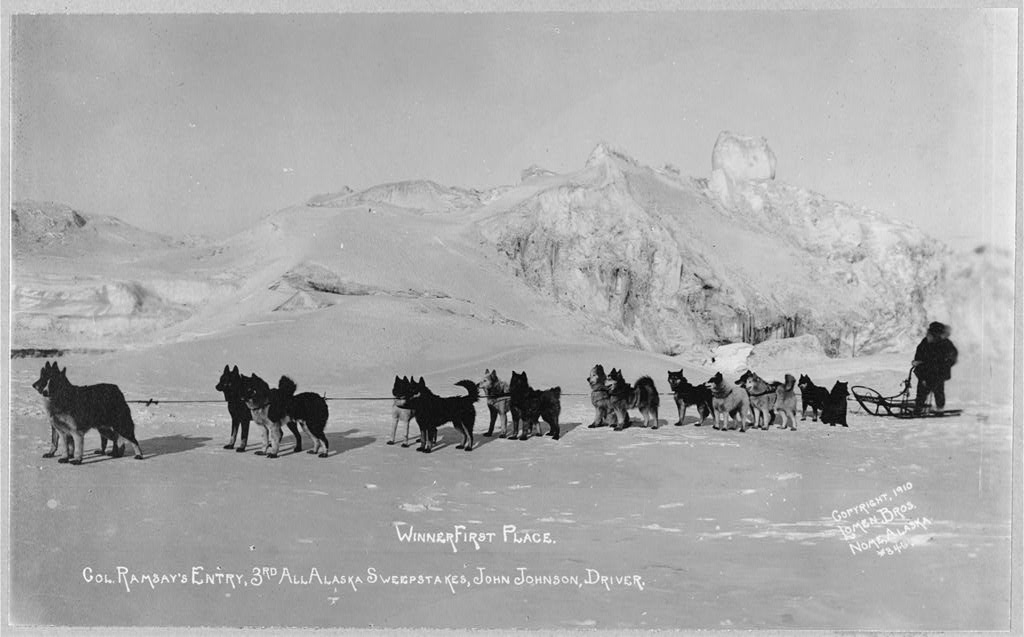
The vintage photo caption reads: Col. Ramsay's entry, winning dog sled team of the 3rd All Alaska Sweepstakes, John Johnson, driver ~ c 1910

The first recorded sled race in North America took place in 1908 in Alaska, the All Alaska Sweepstakes. It ran 400 miles through some of Alaska's most arduous areas from Nome to Candle and back. The International Sled Dog Racing Association lists the winners of the first and the third races: "The winning driver [the first] year was John Hegness, with a time of 119 hours, 15 minutes, and 12 seconds. By 1910, entries had increased considerably, as had the speed of the teams. The winner of [the third] race was John (Iron Man) Johnson, with an (as yet) unbroken record time of 74 hours, 14 minutes, and 37 seconds."

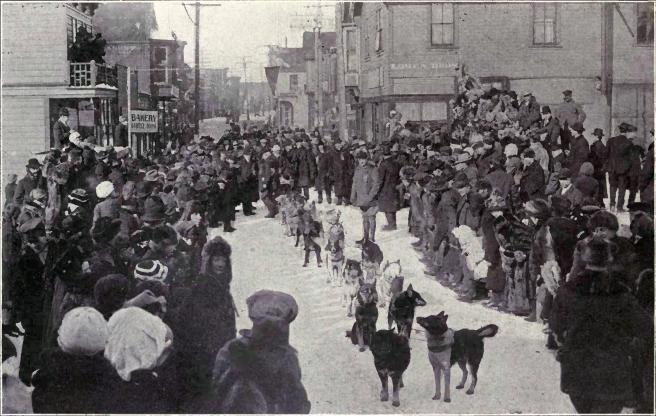
Start of 1915 All Alaska Sweepstakes

The American Dog Derby is the oldest dogsled race in the United States still raced annually today and was the first dogsled race that rose to international prominence. First raced in 1917 and heavily promoted by Union Pacific Railroad, it was on par with the Kentucky Derby and with the Indianapolis 500 in terms of interest and press coverage in the early part of the 20th century and was considered to be the world championship dogsled race. American Dog Derby mushers were international celebrities to such degree that one photogenic female musher named Lydia Hutchinson was tapped by a producer to star in his movie. She may have been on her way to being a movie star when she died of pneumonia in 1930. The American Dog Derby popularized dogsled racing in the 1920s and other dogsled races were organized in towns and cities across North America and Northern Europe in its wake.

In 1929 the Laconia World Championship Sled Dog Race was first held in the city of Laconia, New Hampshire. The first race was won by legendary musher, Leonhard Seppala, famous for his role in the 1925 "Great Race of Mercy", as well as, his lead dog Togo and kennel dog Balto. The Laconia sprint race is still an annual event over 90 years later. In 1932, sled dog racing was a demonstration sport at the 1932 Winter Olympics in Lake Placid, New York, and again at the 1952 Winter Olympics in Oslo, and once more in the 1994 Winter Olympics in Lillehammer, but it did not gain official event status.

The most famous sled dog race is the Iditarod Trail Sled Dog Race. Also known as the "Last Great Race on Earth", the Iditarod is roughly 1,000 miles (1,600 km) of some of the roughest terrain in the world. The race consists of fierce mountains, frozen rivers, thick forests, and desolate tundras. Each team of 12–16 dogs must go from Anchorage all the way to Nome. It commemorates the 1925 serum run to Nome. The first idea for a commemorative sled dog race over the historically significant Iditarod Trail was conceived Dorothy Page, the chair of the Wasilla-Knik Centennial Committee. Even though the race known today was not first run until 1973, thanks to the work of Joe Redington and his supporters. Joe Redington and the Iditarod helped restart worldwide interest in mushing, specifically in long-distance events.

Since mushing's resurgence, the sport has proliferated and sled dog races are hosted in towns around the world, from Norway and Finland to Alaska and Michigan. Due to the cold temperatures needed for sled dog racing, most races are held in winter in cold climates, but occasional carting events, typically known as dryland races, have been held in warmer weather.

A resurfaced race in 2020 is the Klondike Dog Derby, a 40-mile race around Lake Minnetonka in Excelsior, Minnesota. The race began in the 1930s and died out in 1998, until recently restarting. The majority of sled dog races in North America are held close to the northern border of the United States or farther north. Well-attended races in the United States such as the John Beargrease Sled Dog Marathon, Apostle Island Sled Dog Race, and the U.P. 200, all take place in the upper regions of Minnesota, Wisconsin, and Michigan, respectively. After these races, the majority of dog sled races take place farther north, in Canada or Alaska.

== Format ==
Sprint races cover relatively short distances, generally from 5 miles up to 30 miles/day, mid-distance races cover a total of 30 to 300 miles, and long-distance races cover 300 miles to more than 1,000 miles. Sprint races frequently are two- or three-day events with heats run on successive days with the same dogs on the same course. Mid-distance races are either heat races of 14 to 80 miles per day, or continuous races of 100 to 200 miles. These categories are informal and may overlap to a certain extent.

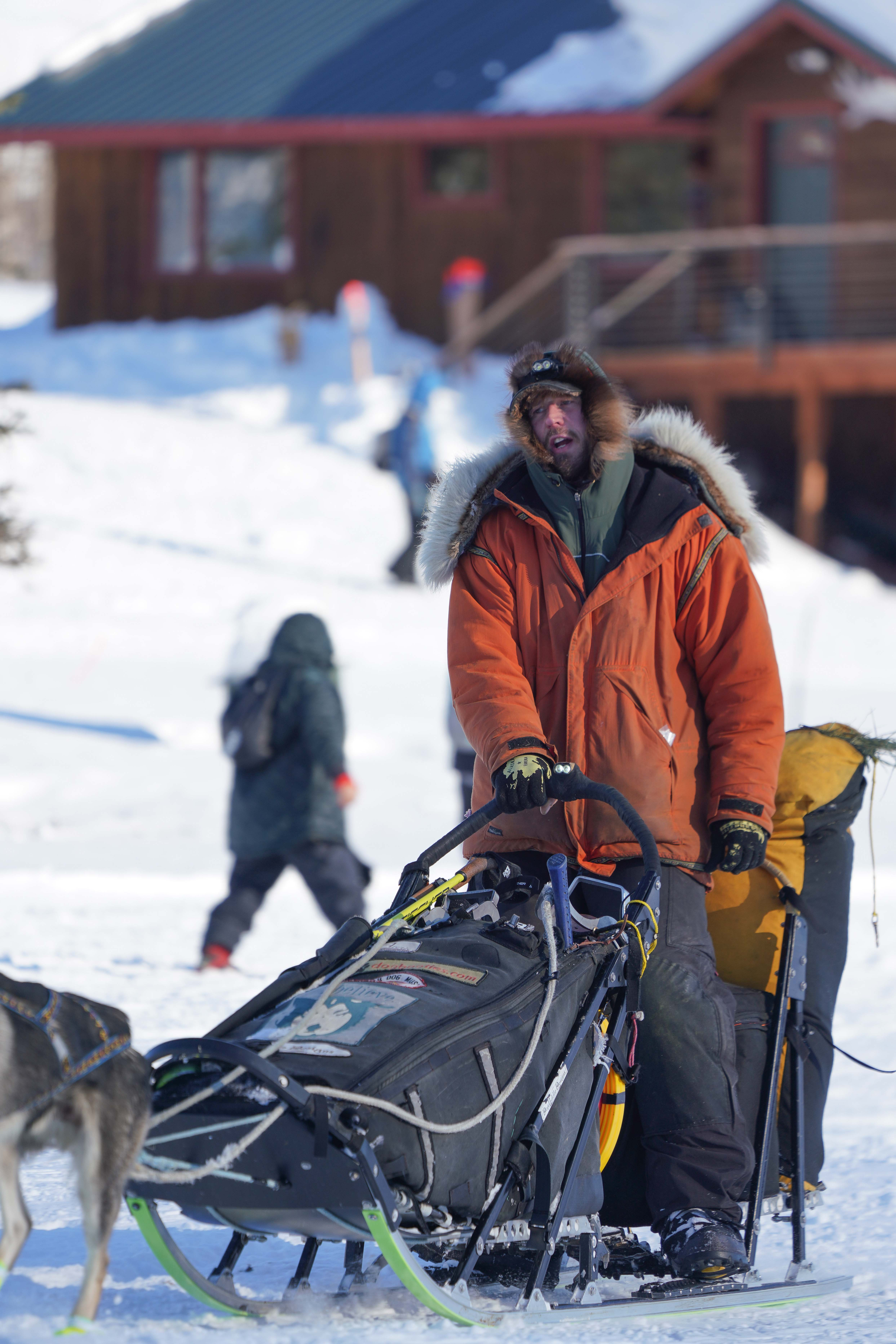
Brent Sass departing Rainy Pass checkpoint during the Iditarod 2020

Races are categorized not only by distance, but by the maximum number of dogs allowed in each team. The most usual categories are four-dog, six-dog, eight-dog, ten-dog, and unlimited (also called open), although other team size categories can be found.

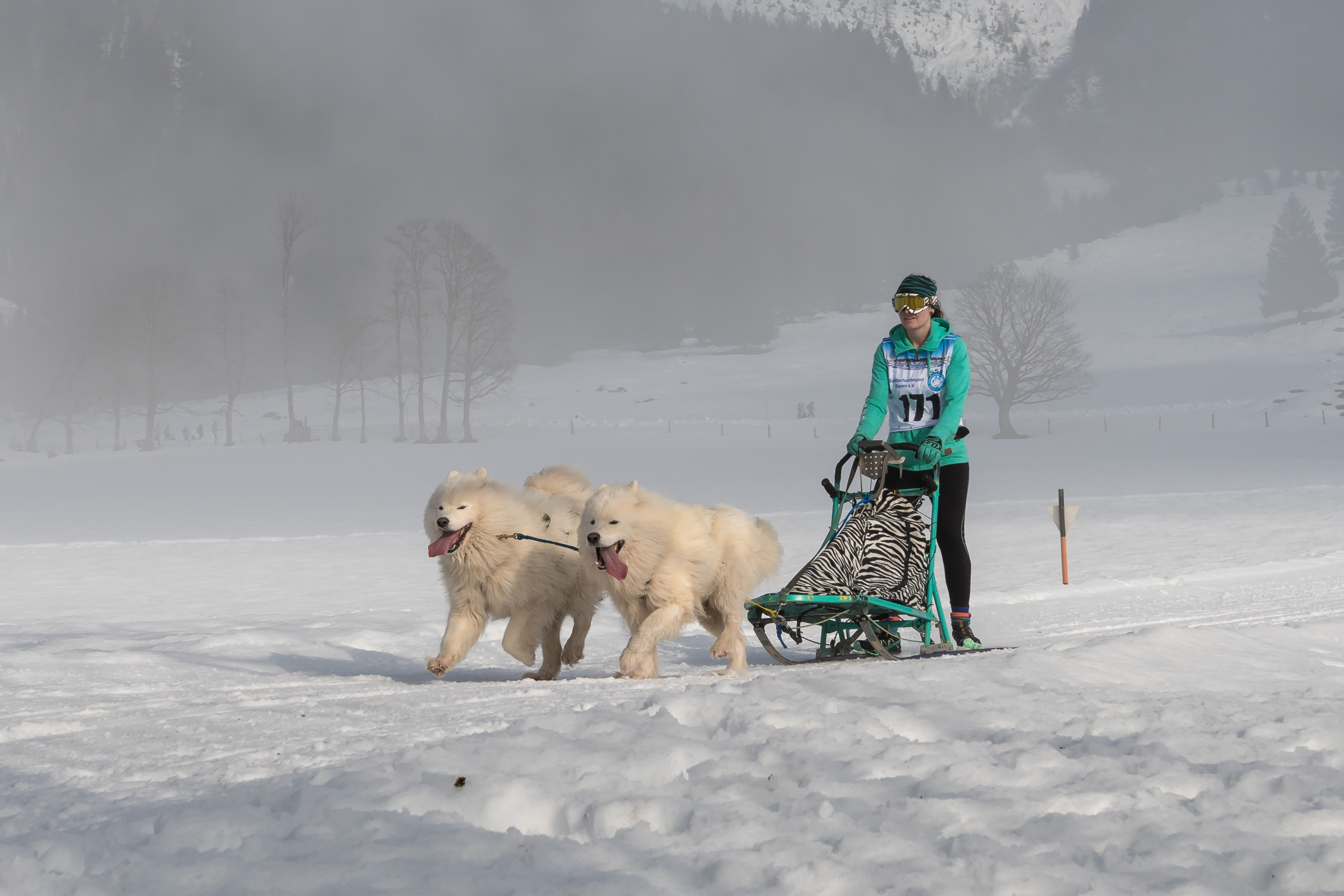
Samoyed racing in Werfenweng

Races are organized either as "timed starts," or "mass start." In a timed start, teams start one after another in equal time intervals, competing against the clock rather than directly against one another. This simplifies some logistical considerations such as that of getting many teams of excited sled dogs to the starting line simultaneously. In mass starts, all of the dog teams start simultaneously. Mass starts are popular in Europe and many parts of Canada. Some mass start events can have up to 30 teams (300 dogs) start all at once.

Although some races are unsanctioned, held under the sole guidance of a local club, many races fall under one of three international organizations. In the United States and Canada, ISDRA (International Sled Dog Racing Association) sanctions many races. In Europe ESDRA (European Sled Dog Racing Association) provides sanctioning, and the IFSS (International Federation of Sleddog Sports) sanctions World Cup races all over the world, as well as a world championship race every two years.

For the race to be sanctioned, a variety of rules must be followed. For example, the ISDRA sanctioning rules specify that all hazards must be avoided, distances must be reported correctly, and the trail must be clearly described to the competitors. The racers have a duty to treat their dogs humanely, and performance-enhancing substances are strictly forbidden.

Dryland sled dog racing is a variant where competitors use a rig (3–4-wheeled cart with a locking brake and handle/steering wheel), a scooter, a bicycle (bikejoring), or remain on foot (canicross), racing on packed dirt trails instead of snow. Dryland sled dog racing is popular in Australia where the majority of snowfall occurs in national parks which restricts dogs from entering.

Another mode of dogsled racing is the freight race, in which a specified weight per dog is carried in the sled. This type of race only has about 1 to 5 dogs pulling the sled or scooter at one time.

There is also a huge following in the UK with the British Siberian Husky Racing Association providing premier racing on top-class trails.

== The dog sled ==
Racing sled dogs wear individual harnesses to which "tuglines" are snapped, pulling from a loop near the root of the tail. The dogs are hooked in pairs, their tuglines being attached in turn to a central "gangline". The lines usually include short "necklines" snapped to each dog's collar, just to keep the dogs in proper position. It is unusual ever to see more than 22 dogs hooked at once in a racing team, and that number is usually seen only on the first day of the most highly competitive sprint events. Dogs may be omitted from the teams on subsequent days, but none may be added. Many other rules apply, most of which have been in effect since the beginning of organized dogsled racing in the city of Nome, Alaska, in 1908.

== Sled dog racing in South Africa ==
In December 2013 the South Gauteng High Court confirmed sled dog racing as a form of dog racing, and therefore sled dog racing was declared illegal in South Africa.

== See also ==
- Pedigree Stage Stop Race, the second largest sled dog race in the United States
- List of sled dog races
- Iditarod Trail Sled Dog Race
- George Attla, champion dog musher
- John Beargrease, whose legendary dog sled runs are remembered and celebrated in the annual 411-mile John Beargrease Dog Sled Race between Duluth and Grand Portage, Minnesota.
- Mushing
- Winter sports
