= Pedigree Stage Stop Race =

Animal race that takes place annually in US States Wyoming and Idaho

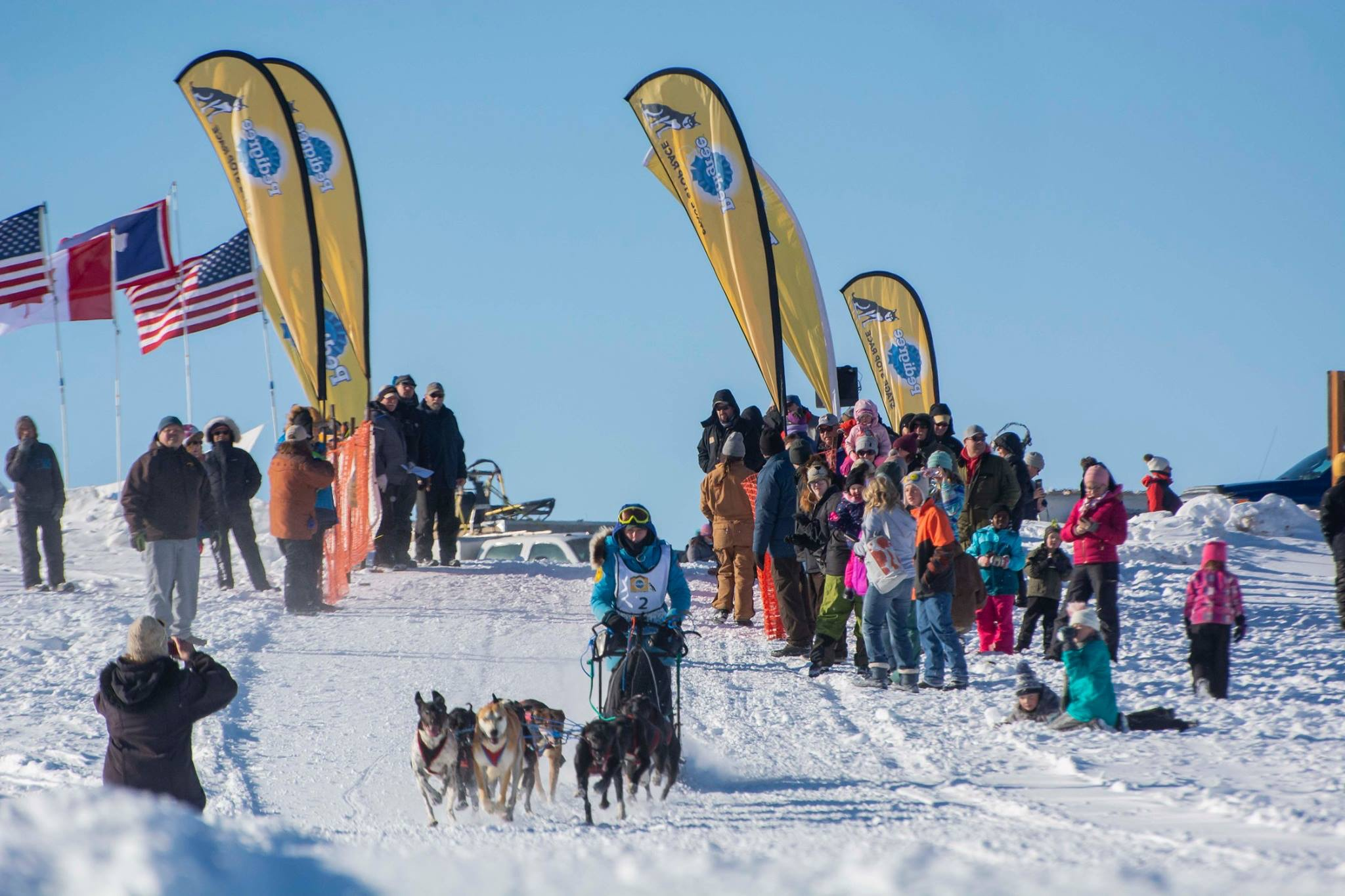
Sled dog participant in the Pedigree Stage Stop Race in Kemmerer Stage, Wyoming

The Pedigree Stage Stop Sled Dog Race is an annual sled dog competition beginning in late January in western Wyoming in the United States.

== History ==
Founded in 1996 by Frank Teasley and Jayne Ottman, the races’ original purpose was to promote childhood immunization rates in Wyoming and make the sport of sled dog racing more accessible to the public. For a number of years, the race was called the International Rocky Mountain Stage Stop. Unlike traditional long-distance races such as the Iditarod, the Pedigree Stage Stop features a stage-racing format, where teams compete on a different course each day, with breaks for rest and travel between stages.

== Race format ==
The race currently spans 8 days, with a ceremonial start in downtown Jackson, Wyoming. Each subsequent stage takes place in a different town or city. Participating teams, composed of a musher and their sled dogs, cover distances ranging from 28 to 35 miles per stage. The combined time for all stages determines the overall winner.

Key rules include:

- Mushers enter a pool of up to 16 dogs
- The maximum daily team size is 12 dogs.
- Dogs must meet rigorous health and vaccination standards.
- Teams are required to follow strict guidelines to ensure the safety and welfare of the dogs.

Route

The race begins in Jackson, Wyoming, and traverses 30–50 miles (48–80 km) stages across several towns in Wyoming, including:

- Pinedale
- Big Piney / Marbleton
- Kemmerer
- Lander
- Dubois

All stages are out-and-back routes where the mushers and their teams leave the starting area and navigate the designated racecourse to a loop or turn-around and head back to the starting area to complete the run.

== Championsw ==
The Pedigree Stage Stop Race draws teams from across North America and Europe. As of 2024 there have been twelve individual champions with several mushers winning the event more than once. Of the 29 victories to date, all teams came from 10 individual kennels. The Streeper kennel out of British Columbia has the most titles with nine victories.

| 1996 | Rick Swenson |
| 1997 | Hans Gatt |
| 1998 | Hans Gatt |
| 1999 | Jeff King |
| 2000 | Hans Gatt |
| 2001 | Hans Gatt |
| 2002 | Melanie Shirilla |
| 2003 | Gwen Holdmann |
| 2004 | Blayne “Buddy” Streeper |
| 2005 | Hernan Maquieira |
| 2006 | Melanie Shirilla |
| 2007 | Wendy Davis |
| 2008 | Melanie Shirilla |
| 2009 | Melanie Shirilla |
| 2010 | Blayne “Buddy” Streeper |
| 2011 | Blayne “Buddy” Streeper |
| 2012 | Blayne “Buddy” Streeper |
| 2013 | Aaron Peck |
| 2014 | Blayne “Buddy” Streeper |
| 2015 | Blayne “Buddy” Streeper |
| 2016 | Blayne "Buddy" Streeper |
| 2017 | Lina Streeper |
| 2018 | Lina Streeper |
| 2019 | Anny Malo |
| 2020 | Anny Malo |
| 2021 | Anny Malo |
| 2022 | Anny Malo |
| 2023 | Anny Malo |
| 2024 | Remy Coste |
| 2025 | Anny Malo |

== See also ==
- Animal racing
