= Dog sled =

Sled pulled by one or more sled dogs

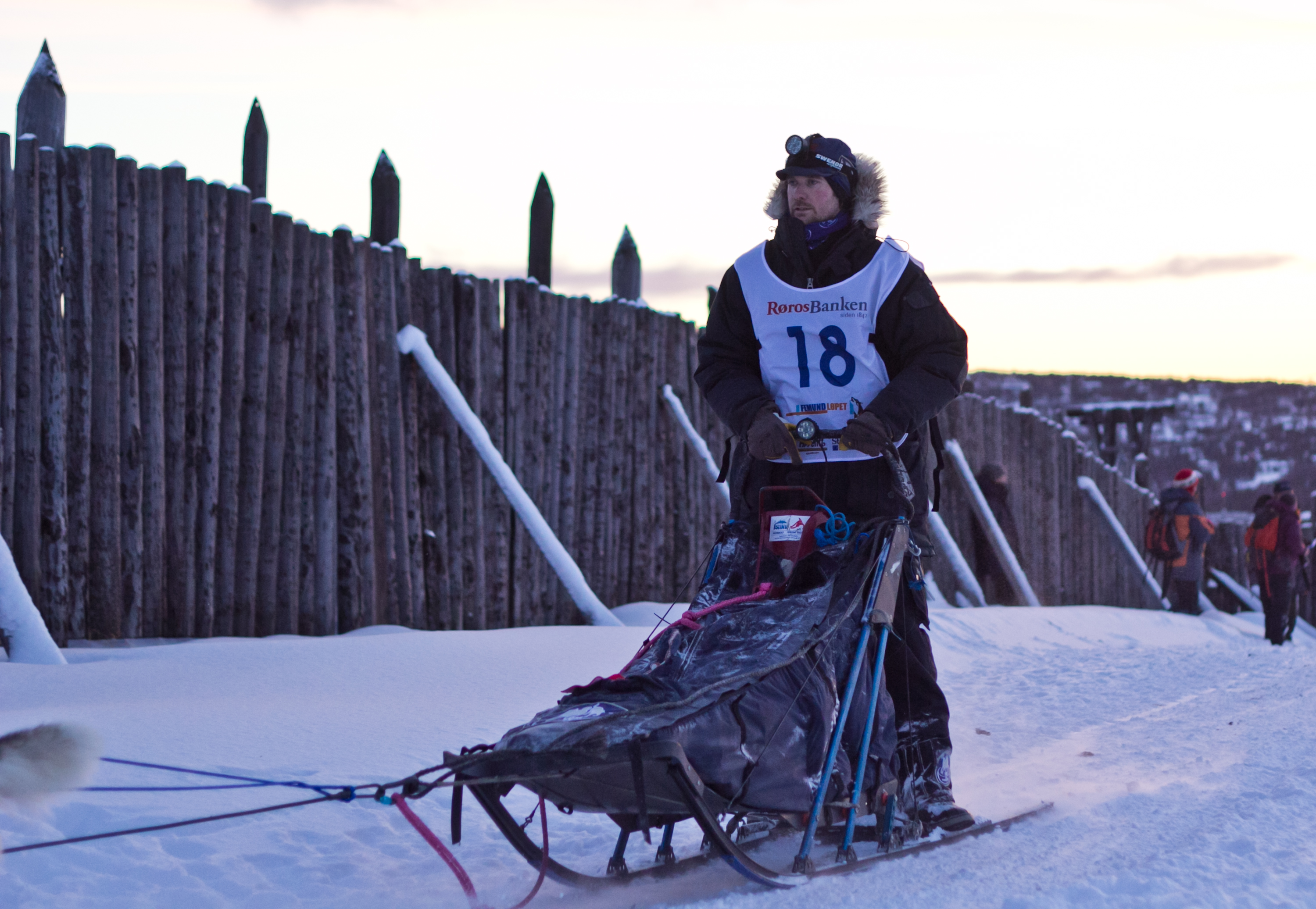
A musher riding a dog sled in Røros, Norway, during a sled dog race

A dog sled or dog sleigh is a sled pulled by one or more sled dogs used to travel over ice and through snow, a practice known as mushing. Numerous types of sleds are used, depending on their function. They can be used for dog sled racing. Traditionally in Greenland and the eastern Canadian Arctic the Inuit had the dogs pull in a fan shape in front of the sled, while in other regions, such as Alaska and the western part of Northern Canada the dogs pull side by side in pairs.

== History ==
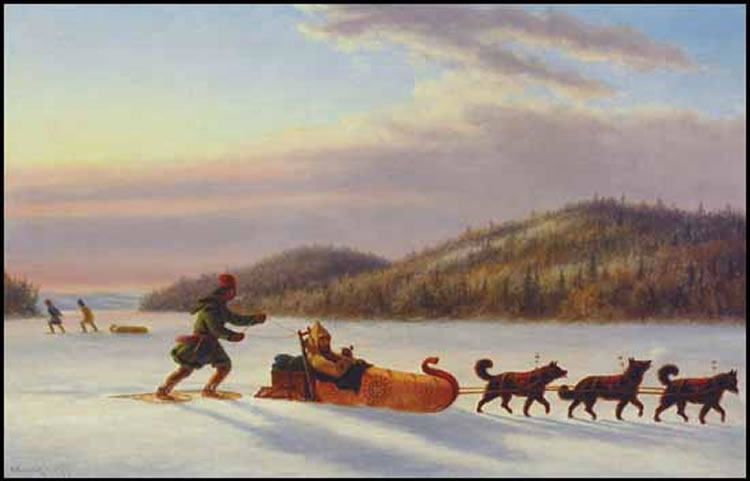
An 1840s oil painting of a fur trader using a dog sled pulled by three dogs. Dog sleds have been used for over a thousand years.

Dog power has been used by humans for hunting and traveling for over 9,000 years. While dog sledding is an ancient tradition, it remains a crucial practice for remote communities that depend on it both culturally and economically, such as Qaanaaq and Ittoqqortoormiit, remote settlements in Greenland. With sea ice surrounding these areas for nine months each year, mushing is a skill passed down from a young age. Sled dogs continue to play a vital role as hunting and fishing companions, essential to the survival of those living in these harsh environments.

== Design ==
Dog sleds come in a variety of shapes, sizes, and designs. Often regions will have a unique dog sled design that best accommodates the cultural traditions, local terrain, and climate as well as available resources. Generally dog sleds can be divided into two main types: the built-up sled and the low sled. Many anthropologists and archaeologists consider the low sled to be a traditional design, and is primarily used across parts of Siberia, Greenland and Canada for transporting heavy loads, such as carcasses, dried skins, or camp gear, across ice or land. The built-up sled, featuring a high rail on each side, was typically used for carrying lighter items like clothing and is primarily linked to dog sledding in Alaska and Siberia. Both types of sleds are constructed using lashing.

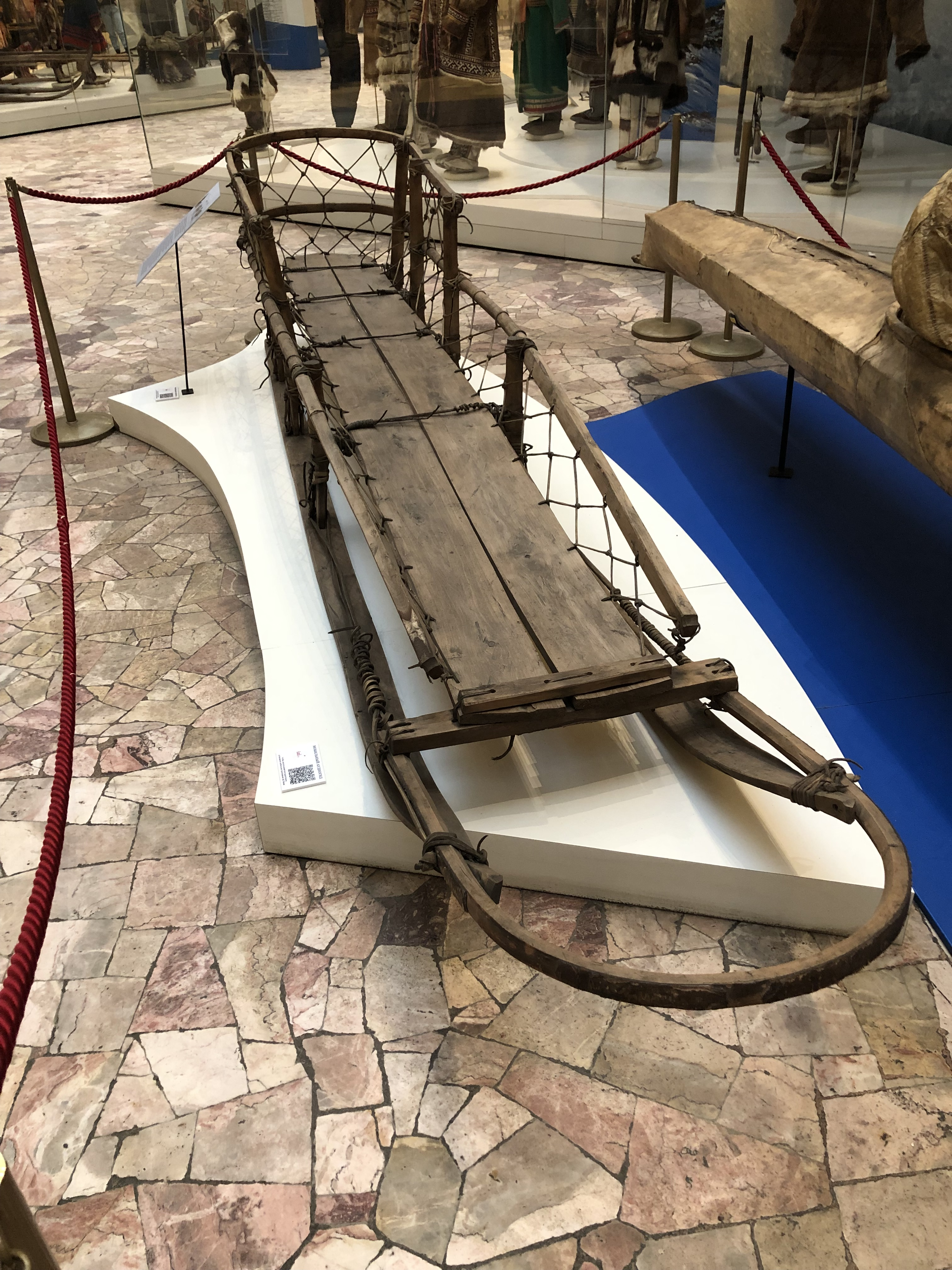
A narta, a traditional Siberian sled.

While components vary in appearance and materials depending on region, cross pieces are a common feature in all sleds. Also known as crossbars or cross beams, the cross pieces join two parallel runners and are evenly spaced from the back to the front of the sled. The structural parts of the sled are secured together with lashing through binding holes which historically may be made from baleen or seal skin. Sled runners are attached underneath the entire edge of the sled, either by lashing or with nails. Traditional sleds may be made from material such as driftwood and, fragments of whale jaws. To ensure a smooth ride, the runners are traditionally coated with ice or a mixture of water, mud, or snow or more modern components like iron and nylon. A harness rope is fastened at the front of the sled, with the front strap threaded through drilled holes on the inside of the runners or front crosspieces.

A traditional Siberian wooden sled is called a "narta." Nartas from forested areas such as Kamchatka are narrow, low-slung sleds in which the musher sits. The Itelmens used dog sleds featuring two pairs of curved stanchions, and a saddle-shaped seat. Many parts of the dog sled were crafted from birch wood, when available, or bone and fastened with twisted lashings. The Chukchi also used driftwood from American pine or oak, while whalebone was commonly used for the runners. While most modern dog sled races use built-up sleds, Beringia not only allows mushers to compete using a narta but also awards prizes for mushers using nartas for "honoring the traditions of the North."

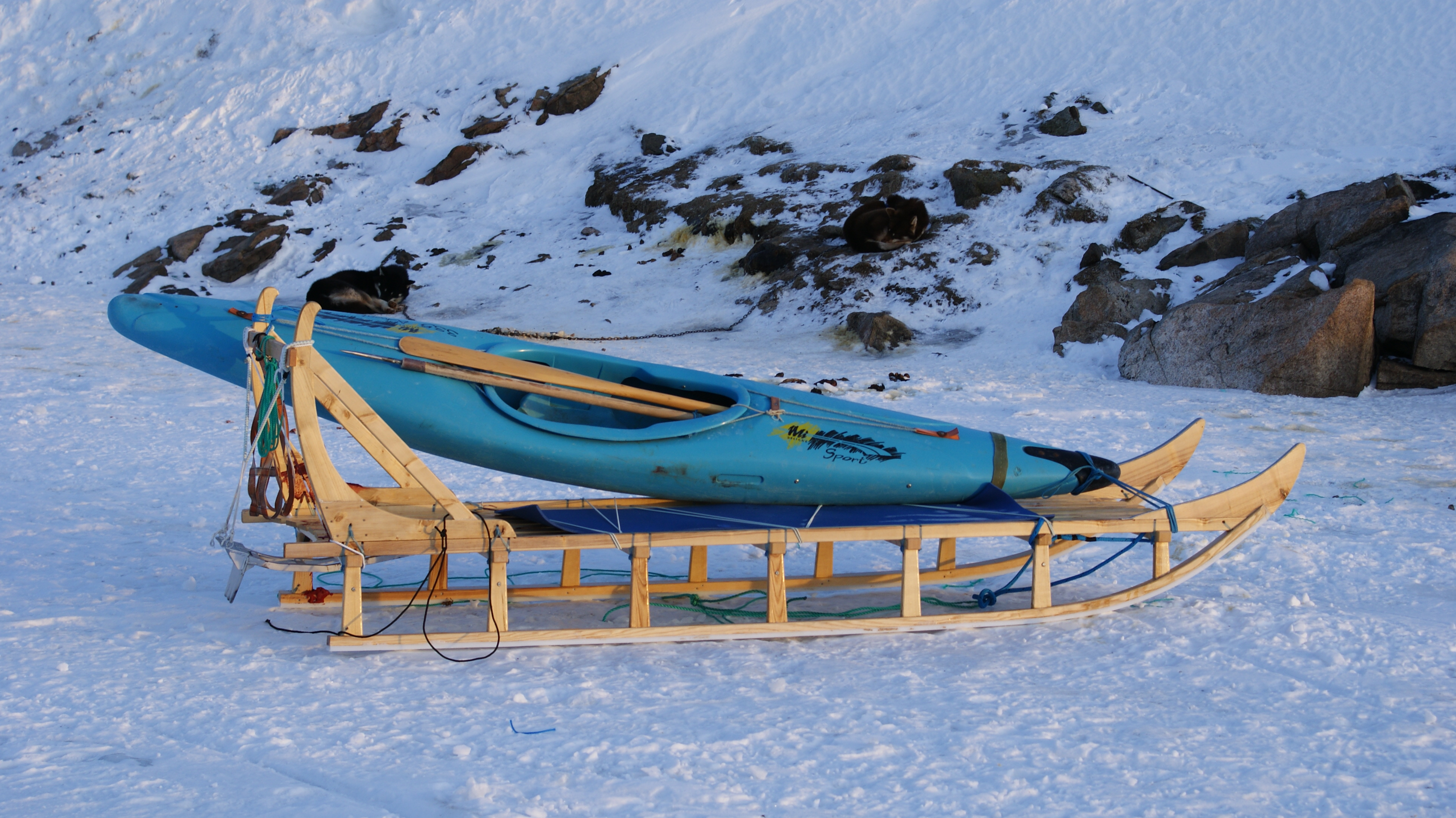
A qamutiik, pictured here with a kayak on top, is a traditional Inuit sled designed to travel on snow and ice.

The Inuit use a traditional low sled design called a qamutiik which travels easily on snow and ice. The sled design believed to be the earliest Inuit sled in Canada consists of two runners and cross pieces. Despite its simple design, it has been recognized for its technical refinement. The curved runners are connected by crossbars made of either bone or wood or in the absence of these, frozen skins may be used. Anthologist Franz Boas and archaeologist Therkel Mathiassen both noted the use of deer skulls with attached antlers at the back of the sled.

The low sled design remains largely consistent throughout Greenland, with some regional variations as well as variations in length and width. West Greenland sleds are generally shorter and wider compared to those from the northwest. Longer sleds from North Greenland are a more recent development, coinciding with the increased availability of wood. Additionally, the longer sleds are better suited for traveling on flat sea ice, while shorter sleds with curved runners are preferred for inland travel. Greenland sled construction is designed to ensure the sled can navigate various conditions, such as steep hills, rocky ground, ice cracked by currents, or rough ice.

Assembling a dog sled team involves picking lead dogs, point dogs, swing dogs, and wheel dogs. The lead dog is crucial, so mushers take extraordinary care of these dogs. Another important detail is to have powerful wheel dogs to pull the sled out from the snow. Point dogs (optional) are located behind the leader dogs, swing dogs between the point and wheel dogs, and team dogs are all other dogs in between the wheel and swing dogs and are selected for their endurance, strength, and speed as part of the team. In dog sledding, Siberian Huskies or Alaskan Malamutes are the main types of dogs that are used for recreational sledding because of their strength, speed, and endurance as well as their ability to withstand the cold. However, Alaskan huskies are also a popular dog for sled dog racing, because of their endurance, good eating habits, speed, and dedication to running even when tired.

In some situations, some Indigenous peoples' tribes would eat the dogs they had either because they were not useful, or if the sledder needed food.

== See also ==
- Drafting dog
- Sirius Dog Sled Patrol
