= Mushing =

Sport or dog powered transport method

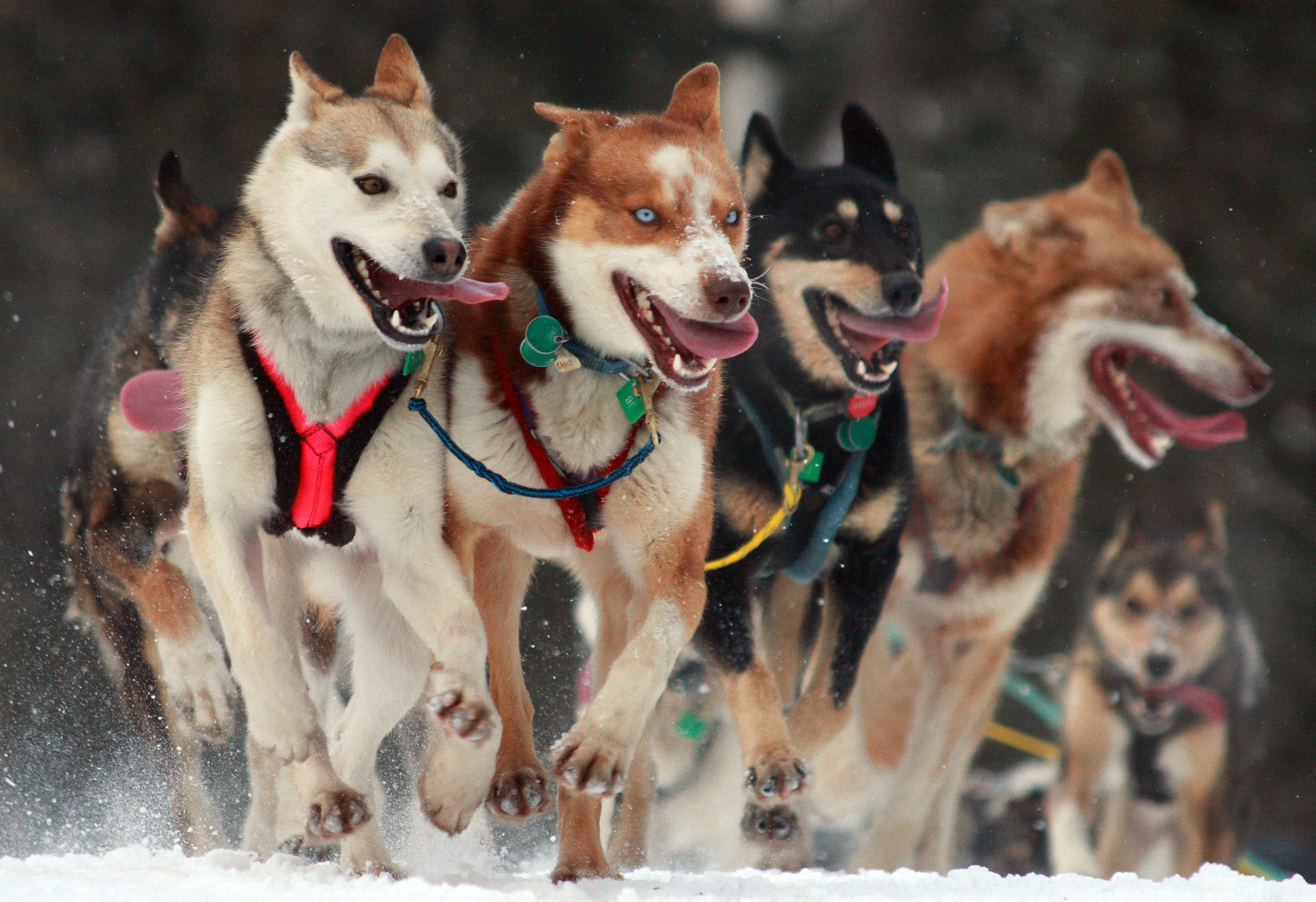
Iditarod Trail Sled Dog Race 2010

Mushing is a sport or transport method powered by dogs, either by cart, pulk, dog scootering, sled dog racing, skijoring, freighting, and weight pulling. More specifically, it implies the use of one or more dogs to pull a sled, most commonly a specialized type of dog sled on snow, or a rig on dry land.

== History ==
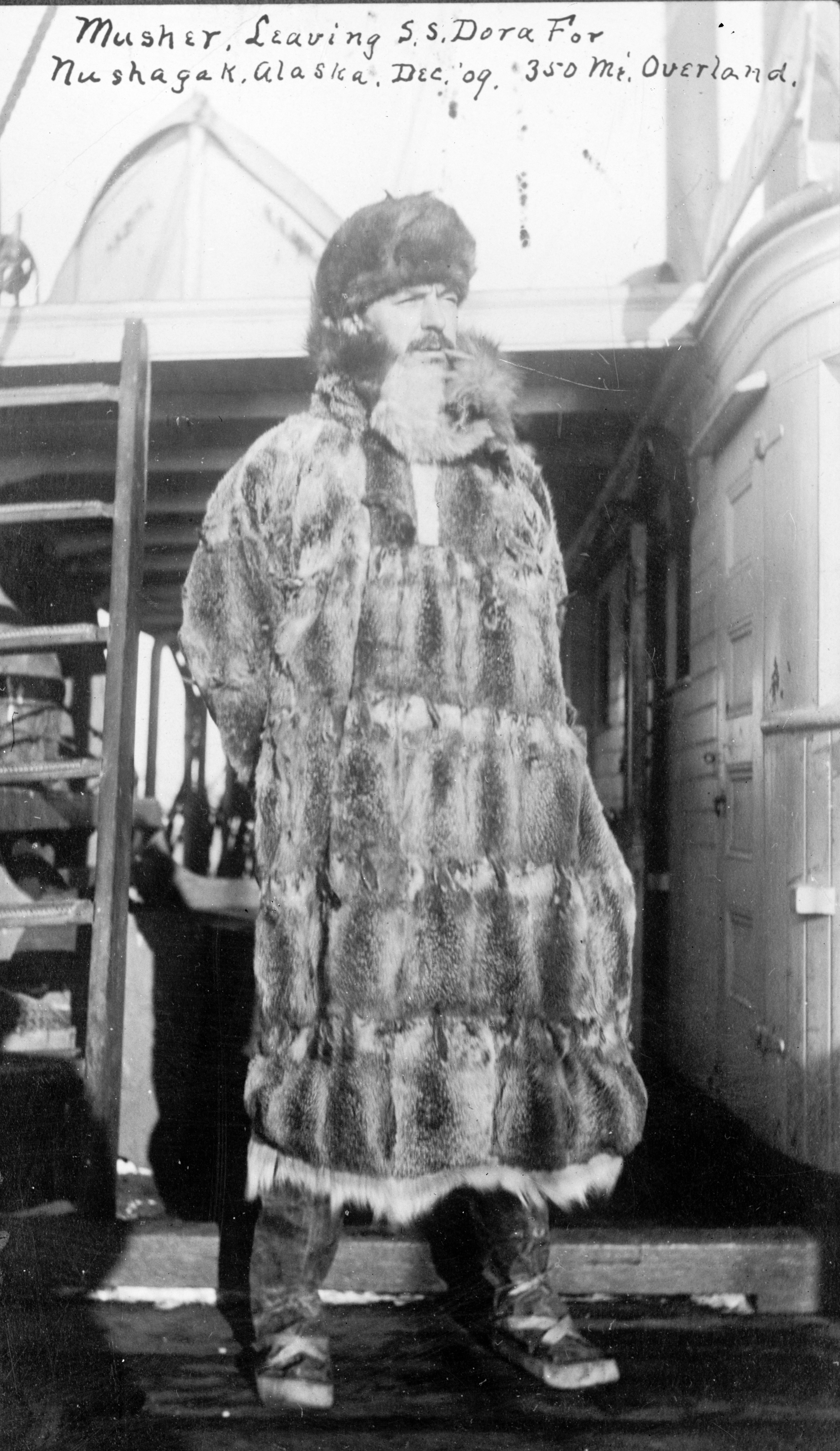
An Alaskan musher in 1909

The practice of using dogs to pull sleds dates back to at least 6000 BC. Remnants of sleds and harnesses has been found with canine remains in Siberia which carbon-dated to 7800–8000 years ago. Native American cultures also used dogs to pull loads.

For the better part of the 1600s, the Iroquois and French clashed in a series of attacks and reprisals. For this reason, Samuel de Champlain arranged to have young French men live with the natives, to learn their language and customs and help the French adapt to life in North America. These men, known as coureur des bois (runners of the woods), were the first European mushers in North America, extended French influence south and west and in 1609, New France controlled all the Canadian Shield. In 1680, the intendant of New France, Jacques Duchesneau de la Doussinière et d'Ambault, estimated that there was not one family in New France who did not have a "son, brother, uncle or nephew" among the coureurs des bois. During the winter, sled became the ordinary transportation in the north of New France.

In 1760, the British Army completed the conquest of Canada and gained control of the Canadian Shield. Many coureurs des bois accepted British rule and continued to use the sled dog. The French term Marche! became Mush! in English.

During the Klondike Gold Rush, many prospectors came in the Yukon with sled dogs. This "Last Great Gold Rush" has been immortalized by American author Jack London in The Call of the Wild. Sled-dog became the common mode of transportation in Yukon and in the new US Territory of Alaska.

In 1911, Norwegian explorer Roald Amundsen used sled dogs in a race to become the first person to reach the South Pole. He succeeded, while his competitor Robert Falcon Scott, who had instead used Siberian ponies, died.

By the time of the First World War, mushing had spread to European countries such as Norway, where dog sleds were used for nature tours, as ambulances in the woodlands and mountains, and to bring supplies to soldiers in the field.

During the 1925 serum run to Nome, 20 mushers and about 150 sled dogs relayed diphtheria antitoxin 674 miles (1,085 km) by dog sled across the U.S. territory of Alaska in five and a half days, saving the small city of Nome and the surrounding communities from an incipient epidemic.

=== Etymology ===
France was the first European power established in the Canadian Shield; accordingly, the coureurs des bois and the voyageurs of New France used the French word marche!, meaning "walk" or "move", to command to the team to commence pulling. Marche! became "mush!" for English Canadians. "Mush!" is rarely used in modern parlance.

== Practice ==
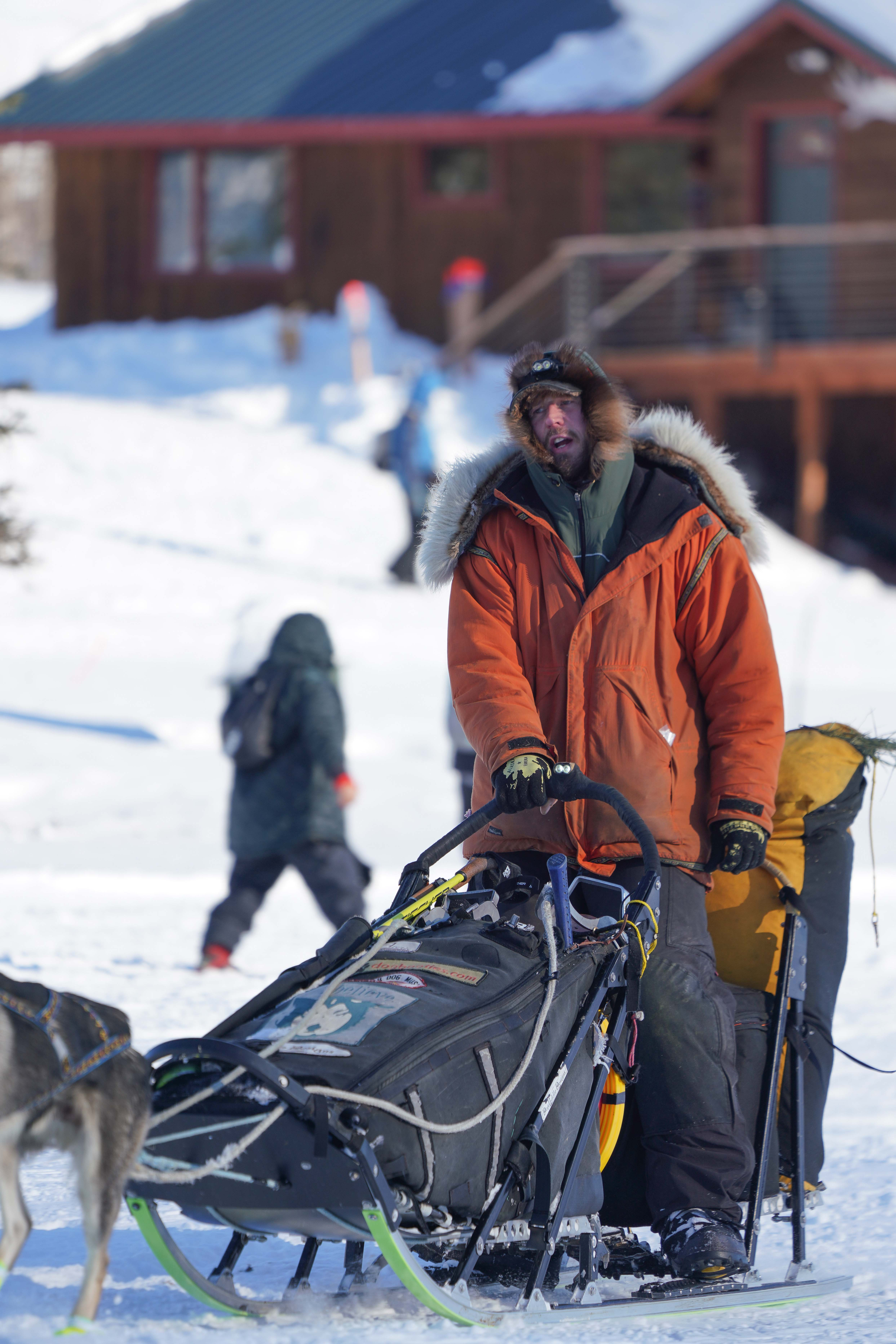
Brent Sass departing Rainy Pass checkpoint during the Iditarod 2020

Mushing can be utilitarian, recreational, or competitive. Mushing as a sport is practiced worldwide, but primarily in North America, northern Europe and the Alps. Racing associations such as the International Federation of Sleddog Sports (IFSS) and the International Sled Dog Racing Association (ISDRA) are working toward organizing the sport and in gaining Olympic recognition for mushing. It is the state sport of Alaska. The most famous sled dog races in the world are:

- Finnmarksløpet in Norway
- Iditarod Trail Sled Dog Race in Alaska
- La Grande Odyssée in France and Switzerland
- Yukon Quest in Alaska and the Yukon

Although dogsled racing gets more publicity and is seen now as the primary form of mushing, recreational mushing thrives as an unorganized sport providing a healthy outdoor form of winter exercise for families.

Mushing for utilitarian purposes includes anything from hauling wood or delivering milk or the mail to rural travel and equipment hauling. Dogs have been replaced by snowmobiles in many places, but some trappers and other isolated users have gone back to sled dogs, finding them safer and more dependable in extreme weather conditions.

== Dog team members ==
Mushing graphics

Dog team members are given titles according to their position in the team relative to the sled. These include leaders or lead dogs, swing dogs, team dogs, and wheelers or wheel dogs.

Lead dogs steer the rest of the team and set the pace. Leaders may be single or double; the latter is more common now, though single leaders used to be more common during the mid-20th century. Sometimes a leader may be unhitched (a loose or free leader) to find the trail for the rest of the team, but the practice is uncommon and is not allowed at races. Qualities for a good lead dog are intelligence, initiative, common sense, and the ability to find a trail in bad conditions.

Swing dogs or point dogs are directly behind the leader (one dog if the team is in single hitch). They swing the rest of the team behind them in turns or curves on the trail. (Some mushers use the term swag dog to denote a team dog.)

Team dogs are those between the wheelers and the swing dogs, and add power to the team. A small team may not have dogs in this position. Alternatively, the term may be used to describe any dog in a dog team.

Wheel dogs are those nearest the sled and musher, and a good wheeler must have a relatively calm temperament so as not to be startled by the sled moving just behind it. Strength, steadiness, and ability to help guide the sled around tight curves are qualities valued in "wheelers."

Originally, sled dogs would run in either one or two straight lines, depending on how many people were driving the sled (two lines if there was one person, one line if there were two people). However, now, all dogs run in two lines, even if there is more than one person.

== Equipment ==
Many pieces of equipment are useful or necessary for driving sled dogs, depending on the sled or vehicle, terrain, weather conditions, size of the team and dogs, speed of the run, and other factors.

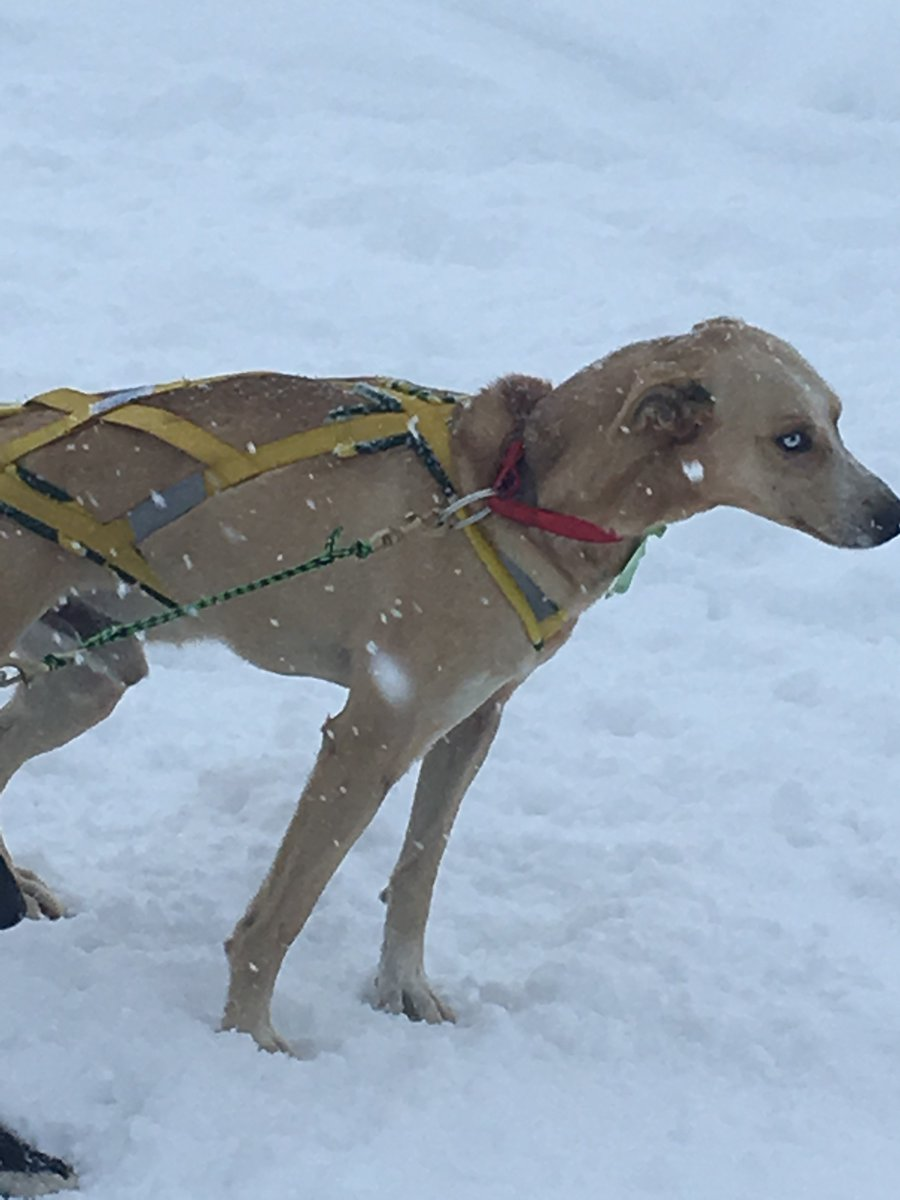
A sled dog wearing a common X-back style harness

=== Harnesses ===
Harnesses are worn by dogs used in mushing to allow them to run and pull with freedom of movement. They are designed to distribute pulling weight evenly over the body, and are made of material that is durable and lightweight to varying degrees. Many different styles of sled dog harnesses exist for specialized styles of mushing and dogs, with many outfitters evolving and updating designs and materials to fit the needs of different mushers. The most commonly used styles include X-back (also referred to as racing harnesses), half-back (used more commonly in mushing where the line angle is steeper such as canicross and bikejoring), and spreader-bar/freighting (used for hauling heavy loads low to the ground, or by wheel dogs on teams). Harnesses have certain requirements for some competitions such as weight pull, to ensure the safety of the dog in their task.

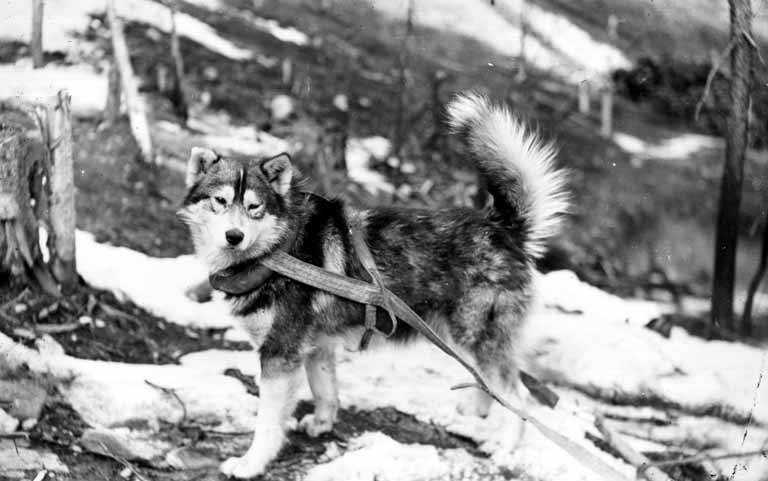
Freighting dog in an early form of freighting harness, without a spreader-bar

=== Sleds ===
Dogsleds can be a variety of styles, ranging from highly traditional wooden sleds lashed with twine, to modern lightweight racing sleds made of carbon fiber or aluminum and outfitted with utilities such as steering mechanisms. The nomadic tribes of Siberia such as the Chukchi used sleds which rode low to the ground (known as a "narta"), and sat or lie down to ride them while the dogs pulled - today most mushers use a standing style sled with a handlebar, and foot grips on top of the runners. Sleds range in length, with longer toboggan-style sleds used for expedition and long-distance mushing in order to carry more needed supplies, and "basket" sleds used more commonly in racing and on groomed trails. Kicksleds can be used as a small recreational dog sled, pulled by one or two dogs.

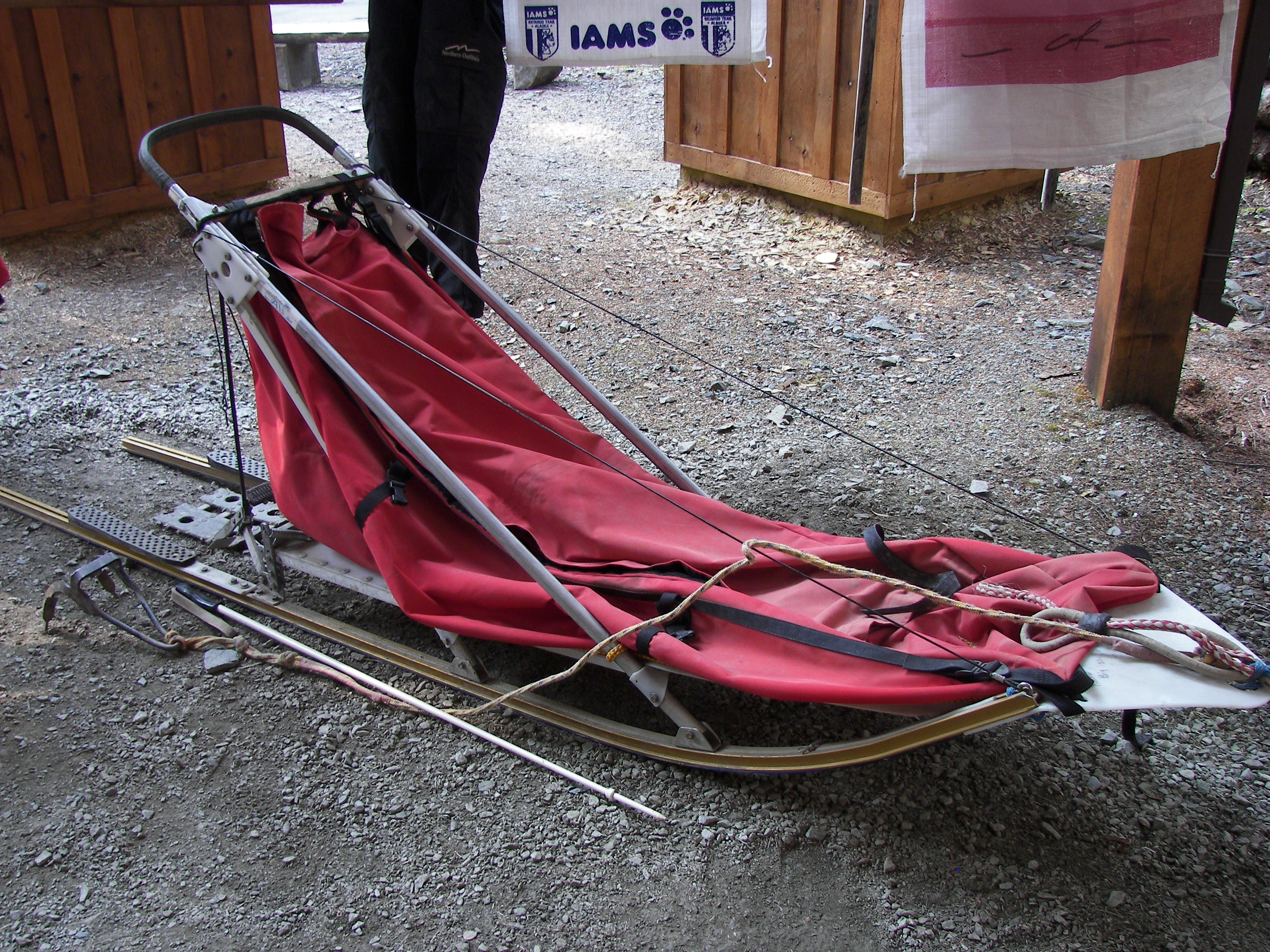
Modern toboggan-style dogsled with lines and snow hook attached.

Sleds normally have some form of braking system, the most common of which are a metal brake (a metal bar or claw) and a rubber drag-mat made of tire or snowmobile track; many sleds have both, for controlling speed in different conditions. Full-sized sleds are typically outfitted with a sled bag used for carrying equipment or injured/tired dogs in the sled basket. For racing competitions, sled bags are often required to have ventilation for dog safety.

=== Other Equipment ===
Other gear used in mushing includes but may not be limited to:

- Gangline: A cable and rope line system connecting the sled to the dogs' harnesses and collars, usually with carabiners, metal snaps, bungees, and knots.
- Tugline/s: Individual rope or cable sections made of the same material as the gangline which attach to the dogs' harnesses
- Snow Hook: A metal anchor-like hook used for securing the team in deep snow or ice when stopping on the trail
- Snub-line: A securing rope or cable used to tie the team to a fixed object such as a tree or post before beginning a run, or while resting.
- Picket Line: Used to attach dogs in a secure area before hooking them into a gangline, or while camping on the trail.

== Bikejoring ==
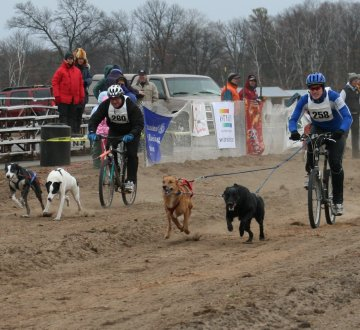
Start of a Bikejoring race

Bikejoring with three dogs

Bikejoring is dog mushing similar to skijoring, canicross, and dog scootering. A dog or team of dogs is attached with a towline to a bicycle. Bikejoring and canicross probably developed from skijoring and dogsled racing. Bikejoring is also sometimes used to train racing sled-dogs out of season. Beginning in the early 1990's, a hybrid of traditional bikejoring developed where riders use devices attached the side of their bikes (vs traditional front mounted attachments).

== Dog scootering ==
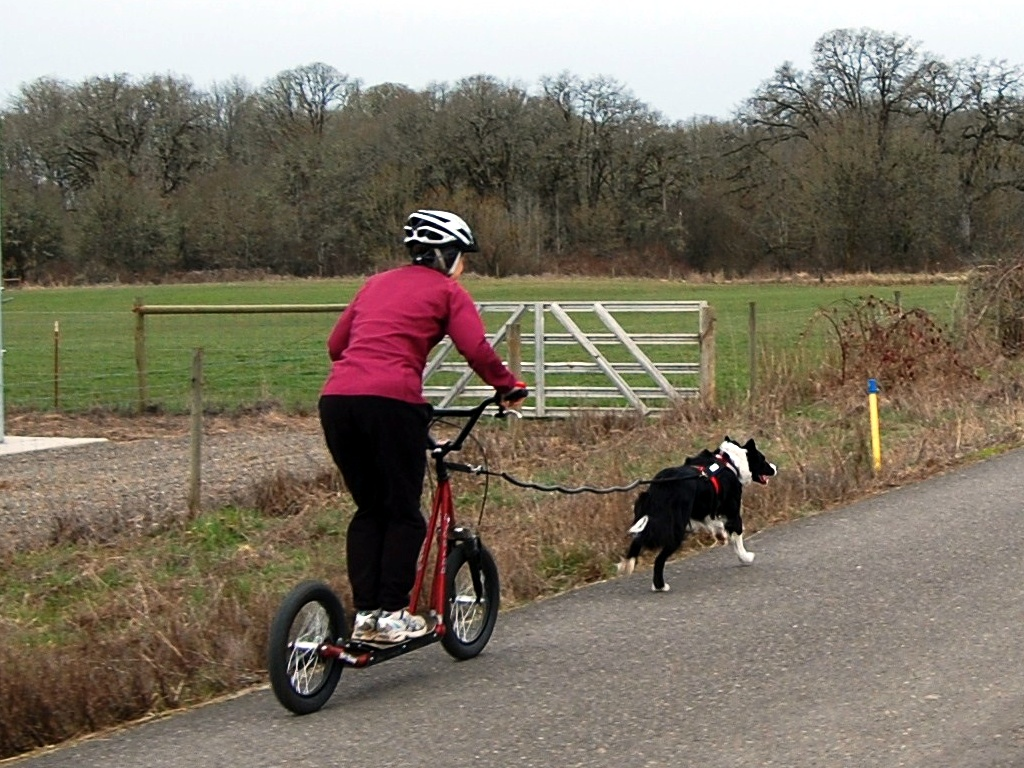
Dog scootering

Dog scootering uses one or more dogs to pull a human riding an unmotorized kick scooter. It is similar to mushing, which is done in the winter, but generally with fewer dogs and with a scooter instead of a dogsled. The dogs wear the same harnesses that sled dogs wear, and are hooked to the scooter with a gangline. The gangline usually incorporates a bungee cord to smooth out the shocks of speeding up and takeoff. Dog scooterers get together for fun runs, where a number of dog scooterers run their dogs and scooters on the same trails. Fun runs may be just a morning run, or can be a weekend-long activity with multiple runs scheduled. This is still a maturing activity, but there are a few formal dog races that include scooter events.

== See also ==
- All Alaska Sweepstakes
- American Dog Derby
- Montana Race to the Sky
- Yukon Quest
