= Mackenzie River husky =

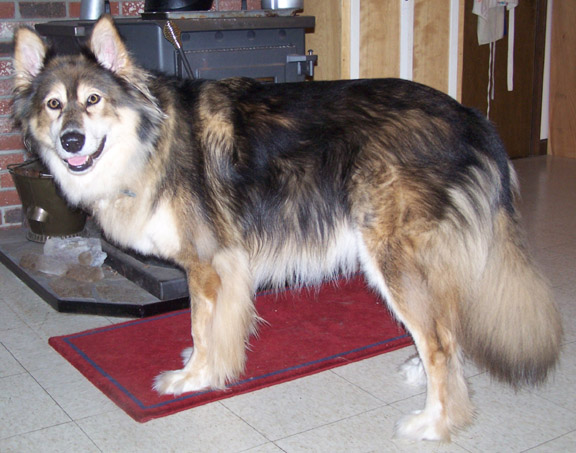
- Origin: Canada, United States
- Breed status: Not recognized as a breed by any major kennel club.
Traits
- Height: 66–74 cm (26–29 in)
- Weight: 29–47 kg (64–104 lb)

Mackenzie River husky describes several overlapping historical populations of Arctic and sub-Arctic sled dog originally bred to support fur traders for Hudson's Bay Company and later prospectors during the Klondike Gold Rush. A mixture of native sled dogs and European freighting dogs, Mackenzie River huskies were prized for their ability to haul heavy loads long distances in the snow with minimal care. Since the advent of modern mechanized travel in the Arctic, moving cargo by dogsled has become nearly obsolete and only small populations of these dogs still exist.

== Description ==
=== Appearance ===
The Mackenzie River husky stands 26 to 29 inches (66 to 74 cm) in height and weighs 63 to 104 pounds (29 to 47 kg). Usually long-coated, they are rangy, deep-chested and long-legged, built for heavy freighting in single file through deep snow. Their colors are the usual northern-dog range of black and white, shades of grey and sable, tan, blond, and red.

=== Behavior ===
Contemporary sources described the Mackenzie River Husky as solid and dependable dogs, rarely aggressive towards humans but prone to scuffles with other dogs. They make poor watchdogs but enjoy their work as sled dogs.

== History ==
The Mackenzie River husky breed emerged in the mid-1800s during a demand for larger, stronger sled dogs. At this time, Hudson's Bay Company administrator George Simpson provided incentives to reduce staffing and improve efficiency, encouraging mushers to demand larger, stronger dogs capable of longer distances and heavier cargoes. To meet this demand, dog mushers began intentionally mixing indigenous North American sled dogs with European drafting breeds, such as mastiffs, Newfoundland Dogs, Saint Bernards and similar breeds. The term Mackenzie River husky has been applied to various dog populations in the Arctic and sub-Arctic regions of Canada and Alaska.

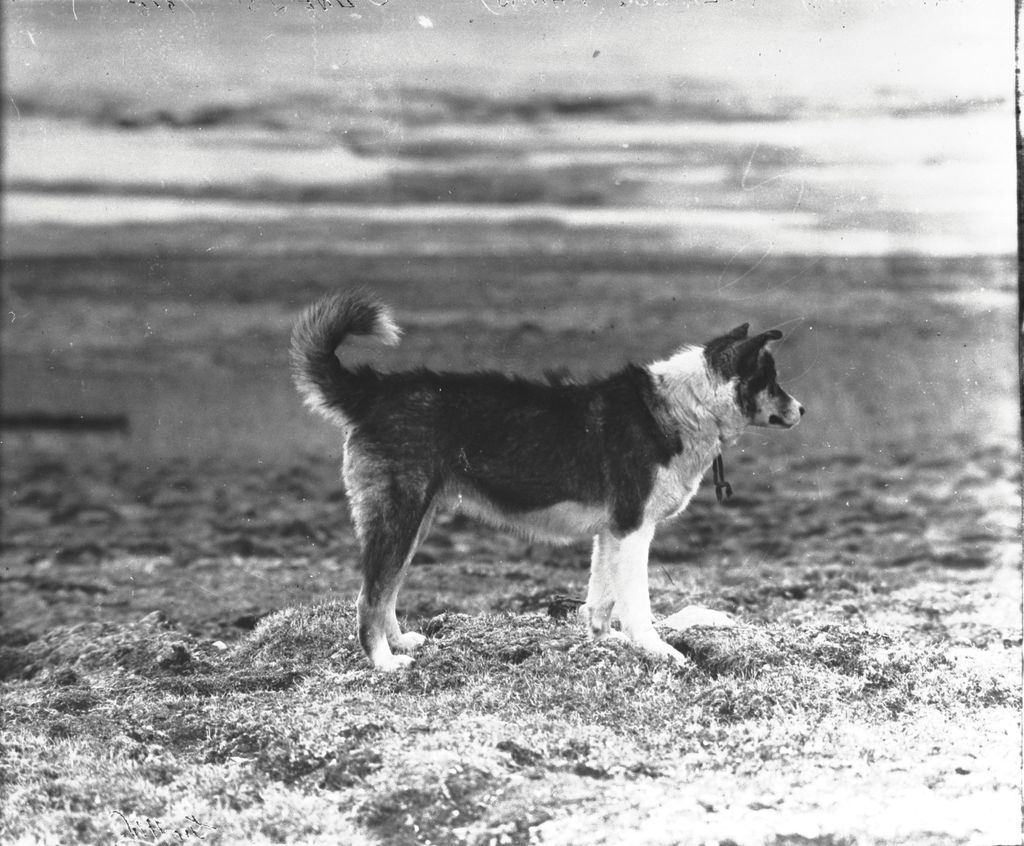
Banks, a Mackenzie River husky. Bernard Harbour, Nunavut. 1915.

Custom dictated the naming of freight dogs by place of origin, and 19th century writers described numerous distinct types of huskies throughout northern Canada and Alaska. The most notable were the dogs of the Hudson's Bay Company's Mackenzie River District. By the 1860s, the Mackenzie River Huskies were prized throughout northern Canada and Alaska. The sudden influx of prospectors during the Klondike Gold Rush further solidified the Mackenzie River husky reputation but also created name confusion as newcomers were unable to discern between the various dog populations and often defaulted to calling all freighting sled dogs Mackenzie River Husky regardless of point of origin. To further complicate the matter, breeds like the Alaskan Malamute had not yet been formally recognized and generally all remotely indigenous sled dogs were termed huskies, husky being a phonological permutation of the French word Esquimaux (English: Eskimo). Writer and musher Hudson Stuck discusses this in his 1914 autobiography, saying:

Many years ago the Hudson Bay voyageurs bred some selected strains of imported dog with the Indian dogs of those parts, or else did no more than carefully select the best individuals of the native species and bred from them exclusively—it is variously stated—and that is the accepted origin of the 'husky.' The malamute and the husky are the two chief sources of the white man's dog teams, though cross-breeding with setters and pointers, hounds of various sorts, mastiffs, Saint Bernards, and Newfoundlands has resulted in a general admixture of breeds, so that the work dogs of Alaska are a heterogenous lot today. It should also be stated that the terms 'malamute' and 'husky' are very generally confused and often used interchangeably.

Populations were in decline following the Klondike Gold Rush, but the Mackenzie River Husky began to decline significantly in the 1950s and 1960s with the introduction of mechanized Arctic travel in combination with the Canadian government's attempts to eradicate native dog teams. Today, very few of these dogs exist.

== See also ==
- List of dog breeds
- Husky
- Alaskan husky
- Tamaskan dog
