= Alaskan husky =

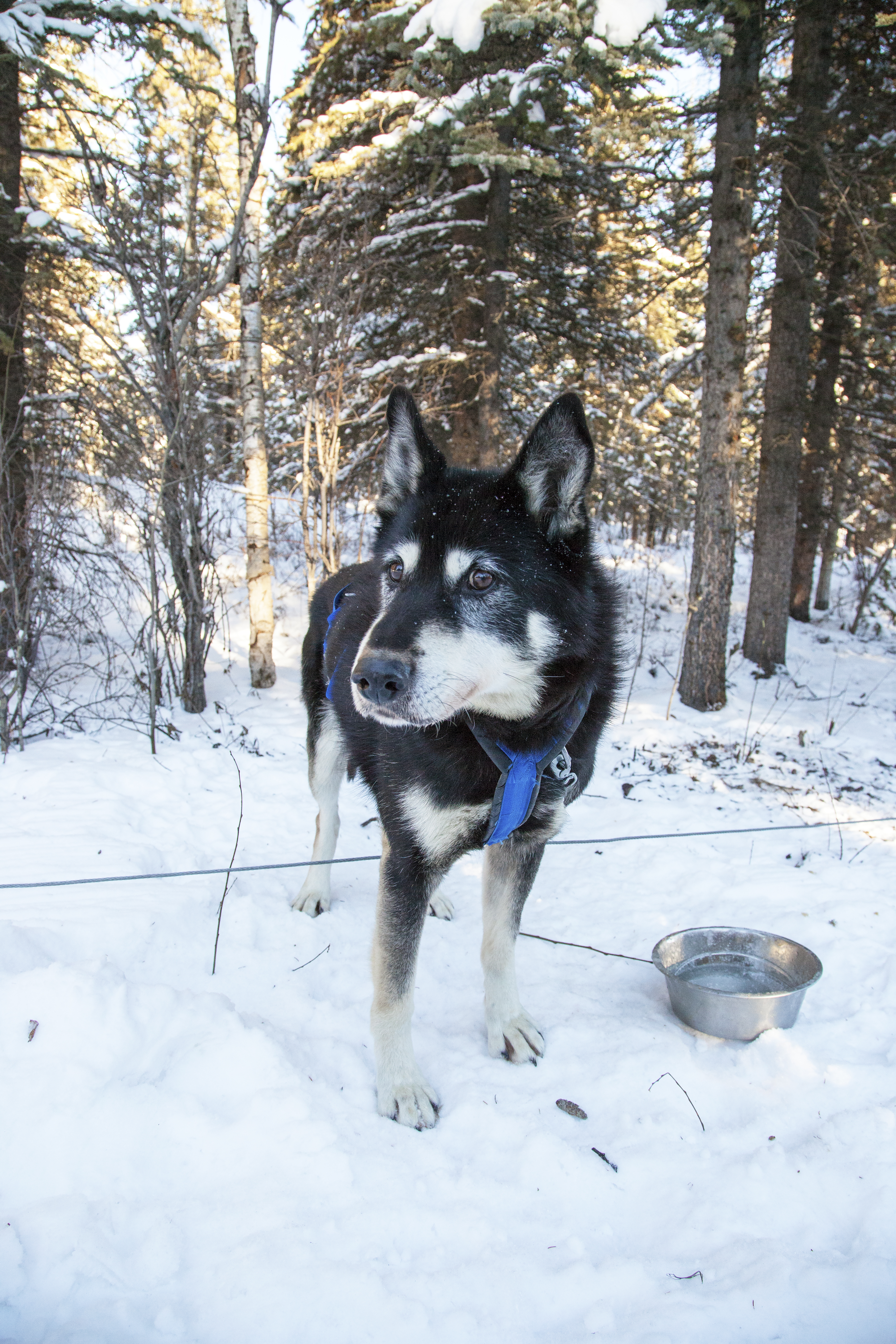
- An Alaskan husky at rest in Denali National Park and Preserve, Alaska
- Origin: United States (Alaska)
- Breed status: Not recognized as a breed by any major kennel club.
Traits
- Height: 20–26 in (51–66 cm)
- Weight: 35–75 lb (16–34 kg)
- Coat: Usually double coat
- Color: Any color or pattern

The Alaskan husky is a breed of medium-sized working sled dog, developed specifically for its performance as such.

Alaskan huskies are the most commonly used type of dog for competitive sled dog racing, both in short-distance sprint racing as well as long-distance expedition races such as the Iditarod Trail Sled Dog Race, the Yukon Quest, and the Finnmarkslopet.

== Description ==
The Alaskan husky is not an officially recognized breed by any kennel club, nor does it have a formal breed standard. Unlike breeds developed for the show ring, the Alaskan husky is instead a product of careful selection for desirable sled dog traits from various other breeds, such as aptitude for pulling, endurance, speed, intelligence, appetite, and tolerance of extreme weather. As a result of this specific and mindful performance-only based breeding, DNA studies show that Alaskan Huskies share a genetic signature and indeed can be identified accurately on DNA breed tests.

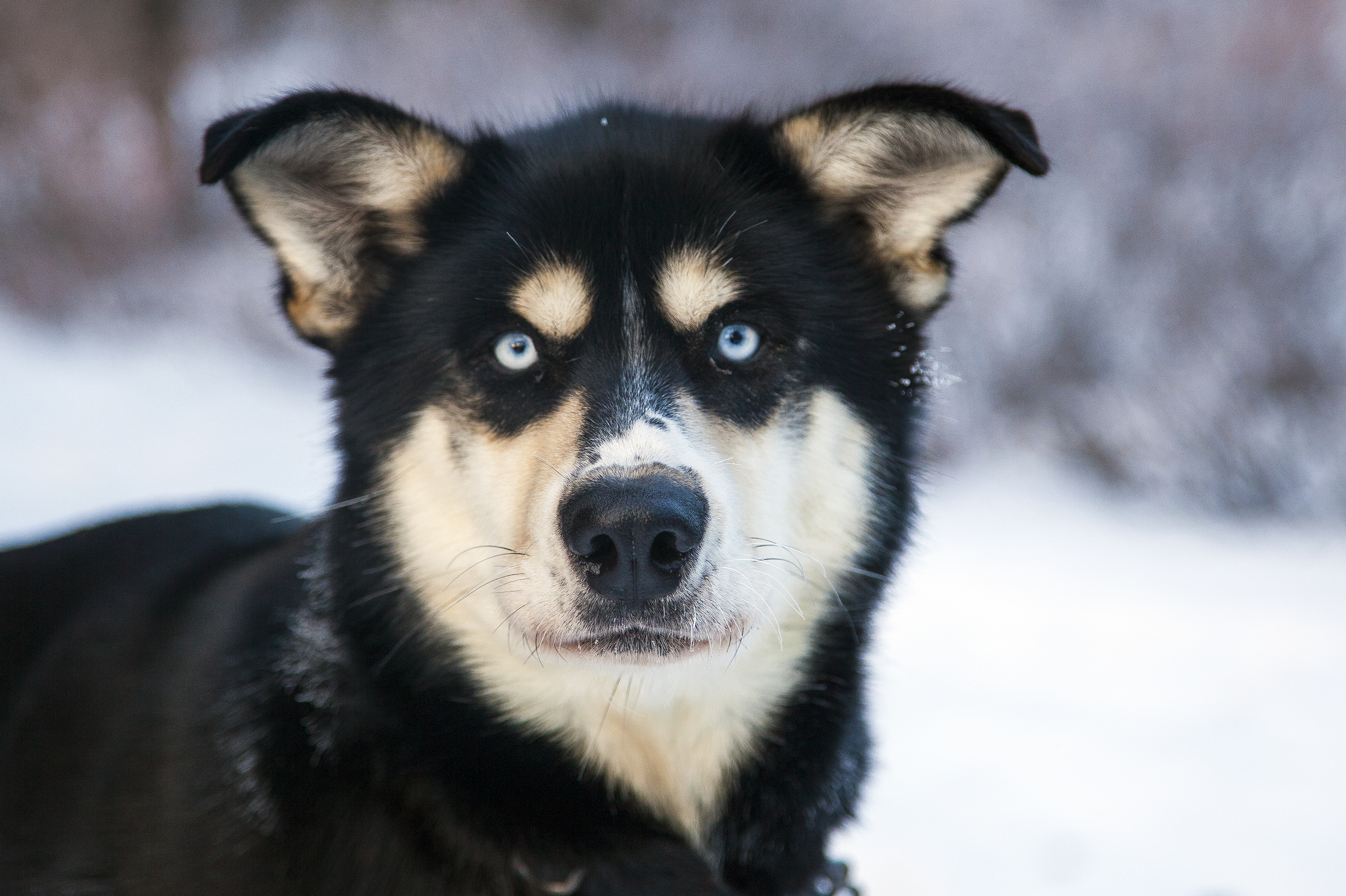
Blue-eyed Alaskan husky, a common feature in the Siberian Husky contributor to the breed

The Alaskan husky is a highly athletic dog variety, and as it is a crossbreed, its appearance can vary markedly, although various lines have been bred for multiple generations and still breed very true to their lines' types. Some Alaskan husky lines have characteristic spitz-like features, such as pointed ears and curled tails, while other lines more closely resemble their hound or gundog heritage with tipped or floppy ears, straight tails and tucked up sighthound-like loins. As they are not bred with conformation in mind, cosmetic features are not a consideration for breeding, and these features instead tend to follow the purpose of the dog's intended style of sled work.

Video of a sled ride with Alaskan huskies in Ivalo

Generally Alaskan huskies are taller than Siberian Huskies and are lighter in build than Alaskan Malamutes, both of whom they share lineage with and are descended from. On average they stand between 20 and 26 inches (51 and 66 cm) and weigh between 35 and 75 pounds (16 and 34 kg). Tough feet are an important feature and desirable trait for breeding consideration. As with their build, the Alaskan husky's coat can vary greatly; they usually have double coats with all colors and patterns of colors seen within various lines. Distance-type Alaskan huskies often have denser double coats to better contend with cold temperatures and harsh wind, whereas sprint lines have shorter coats to allow for greater heat dissipation during races at high speeds.

It is common for distance-type Alaskan huskies to be outfitted with dog coats and dog booties during long expeditions and races, in order to regulate temperature and protect the dog's feet from ice and rough terrain. The use of dog coats has become more common into the late 20th and early 21st centuries as even the distance lines have been bred for greater speed, sacrificing some of the heavier and more dense protective double-coat of their Arctic breed ancestors.

== History ==
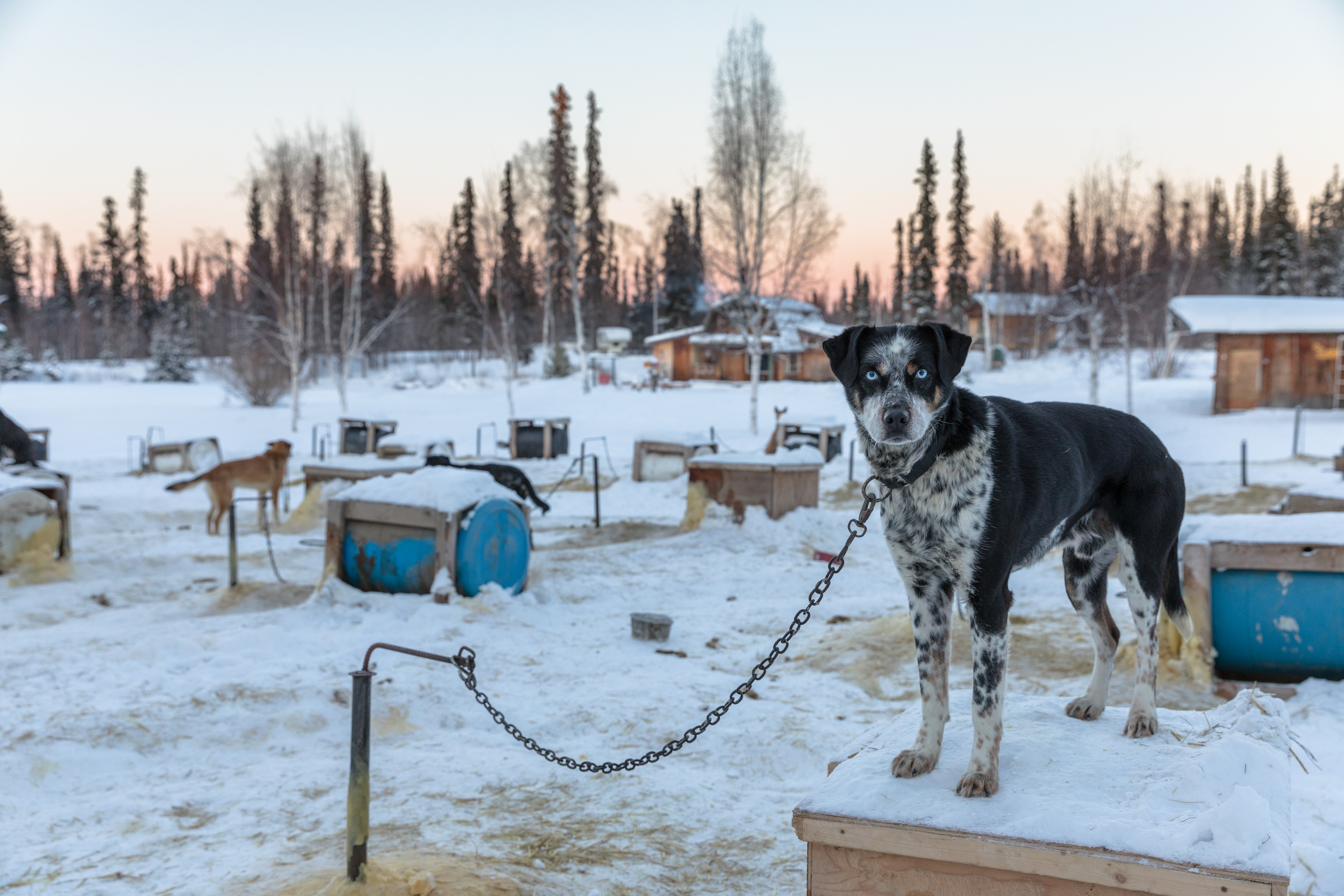
Alaskan husky standing on his doghouse

As European traders and settlers arrived in Alaska they sought local entertainment, and turned to racing the local means of transportation, sled dogs. Indigenous dogs found throughout Alaska were renowned for their great strength and stamina, but lacked speed, so various outcrosses to fleeter Old World breeds were utilized to produce faster-running dogs, including Siberian imports who dominated local organized races in Alaska. Since the beginning of the 20th century, various breeders have turned to various outcrosses to produce different lines of racing dogs. Most lines today contain some form of traditional husky heritage in their bloodlines, Alaskan Malamutes and Siberian Huskies being the most common, although Mackenzie River huskies, Greenland Dogs, and Samoyeds have also been utilized.

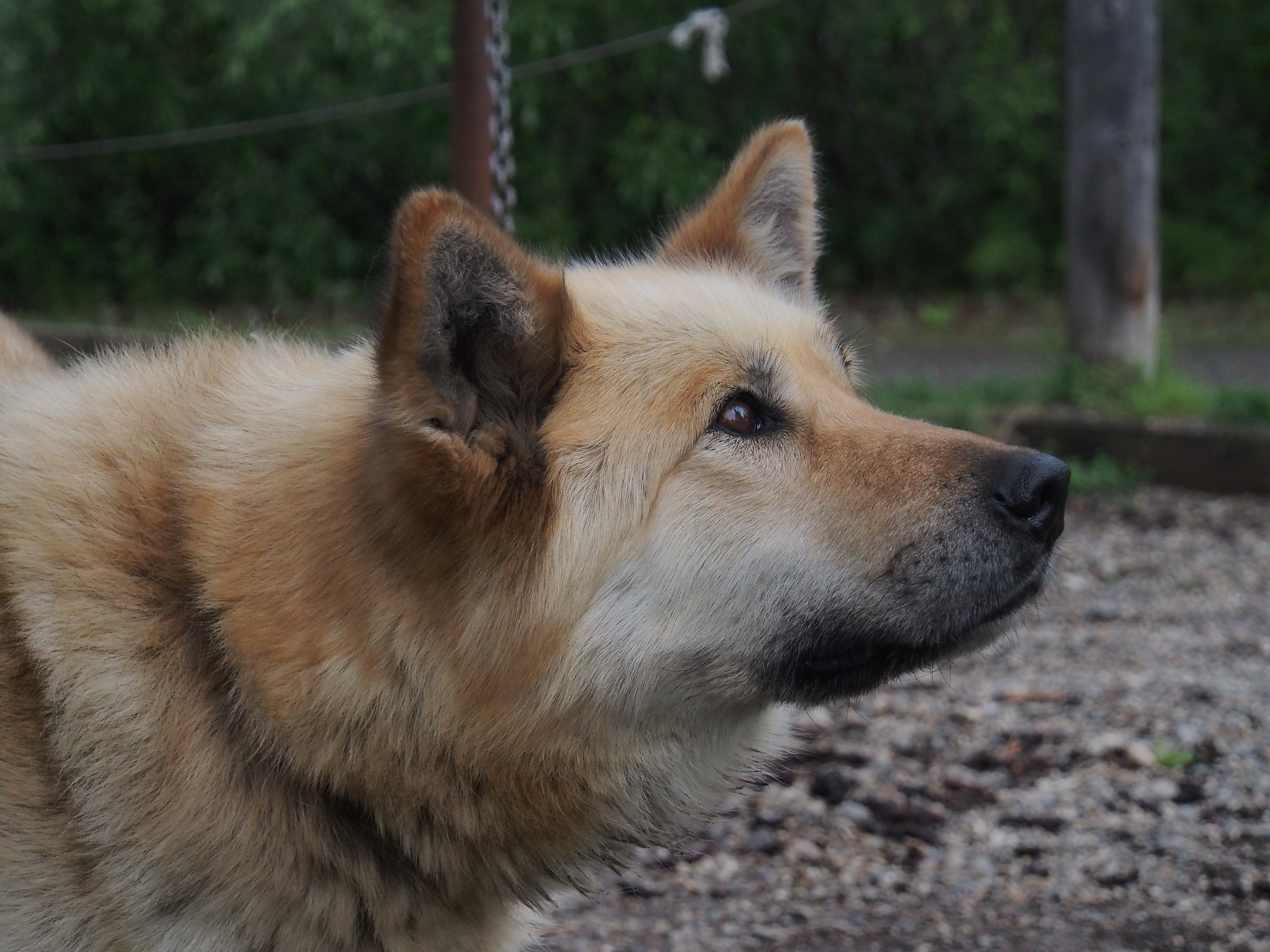
An Alaskan husky at Denali National Park and Preserve, Alaska

In the latter half of the 20th century the primary use of sled dogs shifted from utility to sport, particularly career competitive sled dog racing. In order to facilitate greater speed for racing sport, various breeds of gundogs and sighthounds have now been bred into Alaskan husky lines, including Pointers, Greyhounds, German Shorthaired Pointers, Salukis, Borzois, Labradors and Setters; some breeders have even used wolves at various points.

== Lineage ==
Genetic studies indicate that the Alaskan Husky originates from pre-Colonial North American Arctic village dogs (including precursors to the Alaskan Malamute) and Siberian imports (precursors to the Siberian Husky), crossbred with European breeds such as Pointers, German Shepherds, and Salukis to improve its performance.

In 2015, a DNA study indicated that the Alaskan husky, the Siberian Husky, and the Alaskan Malamute share a close genetic relationship between each other and were related to Chukotka sled-dogs from Siberia. They were separate from the two Inuit dogs: the Canadian Eskimo Dog and the Greenland Dog. The Siberian Husky and the Malamute both had maintained their Siberian lineage and had contributed significantly to the Alaskan husky, which was developed through crossing with European breeds.

Other breeds identified as having contributed to the Alaskan husky sled dog gene pool include Pointers, and a number of other non-arctic breeds by breed and type group. Genetic variation in the Alaskan husky has been analyzed based on the groupings of two purpose-driven distinct populations within the Alaskan sled dog gene pool: a distance group, and a sprint group:

- The distance group showed a higher contribution from the Arctic/Asian group, mainly the Siberian Husky and Alaskan Malamute, and the Mastiff/Terrier group consisting primarily of Great Pyrenees and Anatolian Shepherd. The distance group also showed to be more genetically distinct from one another across kennel-based populations and at the individual level, than the sprint group.
- The sprint group displayed a higher contribution from Pointer-type dogs and Salukis, and the lowest contribution from Siberian Huskies and Alaskan Malamutes, as well as the extreme-sprint specialists displaying the highest contribution from already long-bred Alaskan husky lineage.
- A sub-group chosen for analysis due to its overlap between distance and sprint types displayed the most Saluki contribution, more than the extreme sprint or extreme distance specialists.

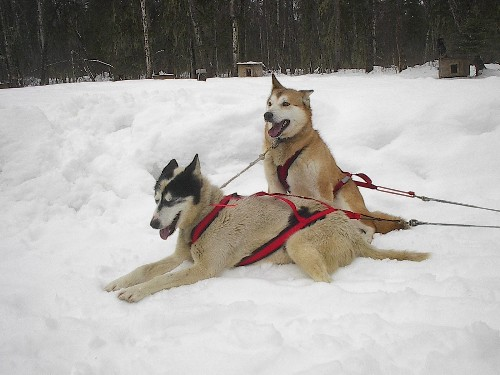
Two Alaskan husky lead dogs hooked up at a race event

== Health and physical capabilities ==
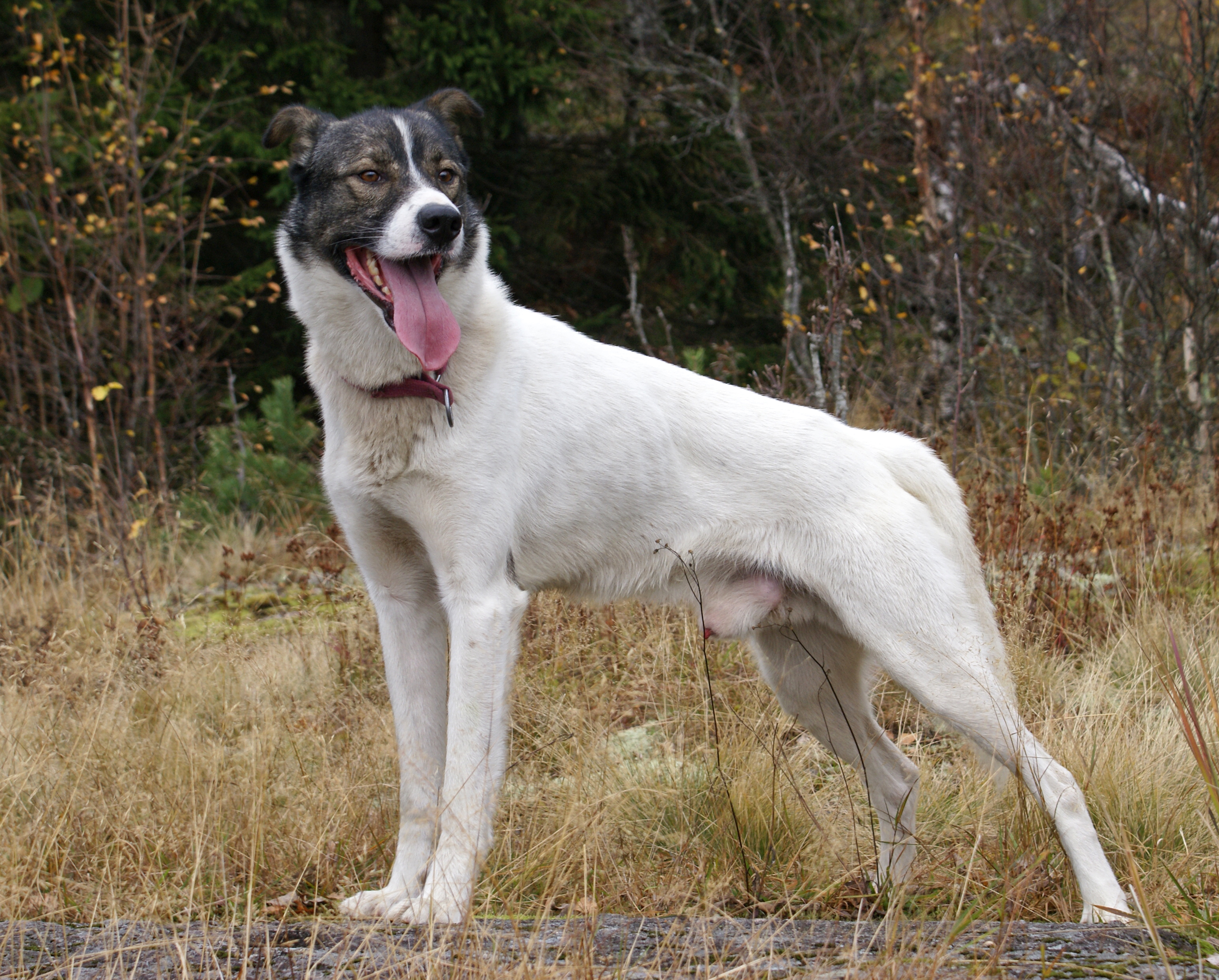
A three-year-old male Alaskan husky

The Alaskan husky has selectively been bred specifically for its athletic performance. As such, its level of athletic ability, as well as anabolic efficiency are far greater than the average domesticated dog, especially in endurance feats. Distance-specialist Alaskan huskies out-speed most animals and all other types of sled dogs when running distances of 50 miles or greater, even while pulling moderately sized loads. Studies on the metabolic capabilities in working Alaskan husky sled dogs reveal that their system transitions to utilization of low-glucose energy sources (from high-glycogen carbohydrates) early on during long periods of travel, and their reliance on these low-glucose fuels (such as those higher in fats and proteins) continue and even extend to become more pronounced after working for longer periods. A good appetite is a highly desirable trait, and is emphasized in breeding choices.

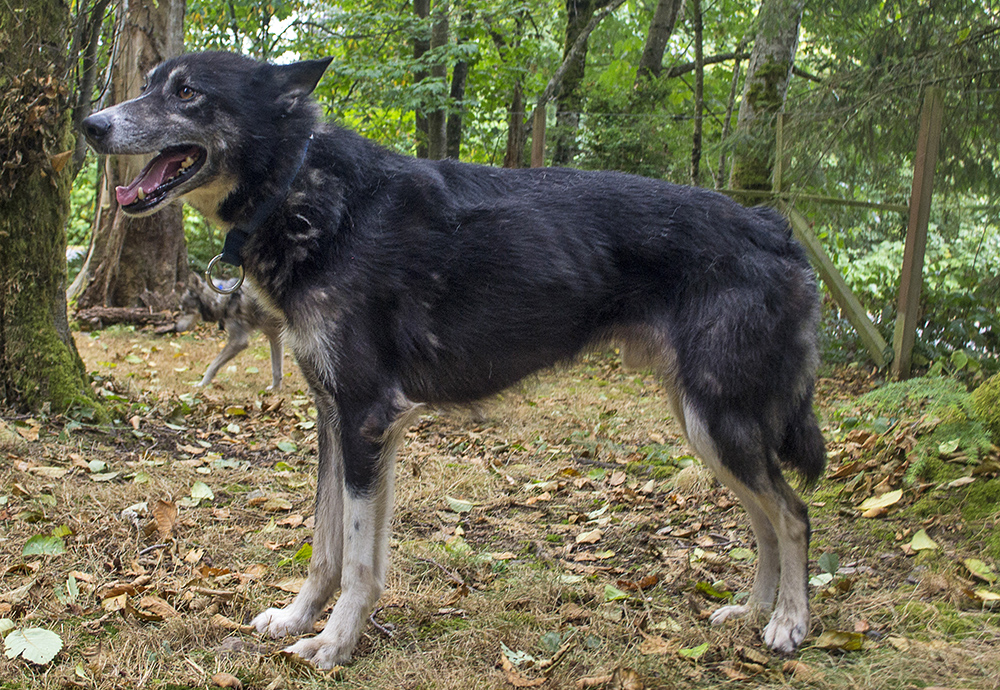
Five-year-old male Alaskan husky from championship distance racing lines

Like most working sled dogs, Alaskan huskies are capable of pulling far greater than their own body weight in load while in harness. Sprint teams of Alaskan huskies are capable of speeds of up to 28 mph (45 km/h), whereas distance-specialist teams have completed 938 mile (1510 km) races in just 8 days, 3 hours, 40 minutes, and 13 seconds with time including 40 hours of mandatory rests and other routine rests on the trail.

As specifically purposed working sled dogs, Alaskan huskies can be subject to climate or work-specific health conditions that any sled dogs may experience, such as temperature-related bronchitis or bronchopulmonary ailments, also known as "ski asthma".

In 2020, the largest study of "canine hematologic and serum biochemical analytes" to date was published, including within it the largest data set of healthy athlete dogs; the dogs of reference were 4,804 sled dogs training for the Iditarod Trail Sled Dog Race, the overwhelming majority of which were Alaskan huskies. The study found that anti-aging and anti-inflammatory biochemical levels in the dogs increased over time and with training, enhancing the dogs' physical and mental abilities until an average of 6.6 years of age. Despite noted differences in sex, genetic, and age groups in other areas, they were not statistically significant and were outside the scope of the study, making them scientifically inconclusive despite their observance.

== Behavior ==
The behaviors and temperament of the Alaskan husky can vary greatly due to the wide range of genetic backgrounds and bred-purposes within the breed. As with all sled dogs, a desire to pull and run are essential and are of high priority in decisions of breeding. Mental soundness is also important due to the need for dogs to be in close quarters with other dogs while hooked in the team, handled by people for proper care and transportation, and for dogs on racing teams to perform in environments which include trails crowded with spectators and other dog teams.

Alaskan Huskies are selectively-bred for their ability to work as sled dogs without direct physical feedback from a driver, their intelligence, and their problem solving. These attributes are highly desired in a specimen and are often marks of talented lead dogs, which are often highly considered for breeding. Dogs are expected to read the trail and situation through instincts and experience, and thus superior cognitive abilities are often bred into Alaskan husky lines in tandem with physical athletic attributes.

== Motto ==
The Alaskan husky is the mascot of Louis E. Dieruff High School in Allentown, Pennsylvania.

== See also ==
- List of dog breeds
- Husky
