= Siberian Husky =

Dog breed

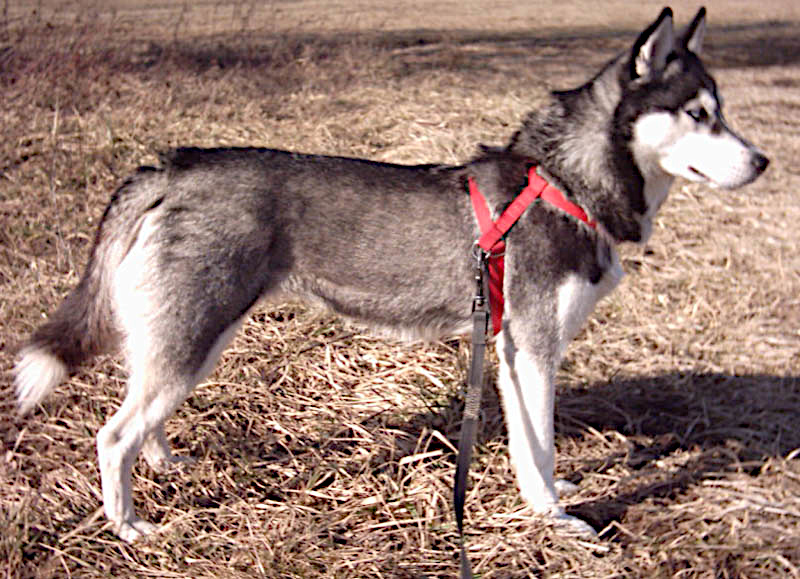
- Black and white Siberian Husky
- Other names: Chukcha
- Common nicknames: Husky; Sibe
- Origin: Siberia
Traits
Height	Males	21–23.5 inches (53–60 cm)
	Females	20–22 inches (51–56 cm)
Weight	Males	45–60 pounds (20–27 kg)
	Females	35–50 pounds (16–23 kg)
- Coat: Thick double coat
- Color: All colors from black to pure white, and including many differing colors and markings
- Litter size: 4–8 puppies
Kennel club standards
- Fédération Cynologique Internationale: standard

The Siberian Husky is a breed of medium-sized working sled dog. The breed belongs to the Spitz genetic family. It is recognizable by its thickly furred double coat, erect triangular ears, and distinctive markings, and is smaller than the similar-looking Alaskan Malamute.

Siberian Huskies originated in the Russian Far East, where the breed was first developed by the Chukchi people for sled pulling and companionship. Other indigenous Siberian peoples in North Asia, such as the Koryak, Yukaghir, and Kamchadal, also breed them. It is an active, energetic, resilient breed, whose ancestors lived in the extremely cold and harsh environment of the Siberian Arctic. William Goosak, a Russian fur trader, introduced them to Nome, Alaska, during the Nome Gold Rush, initially as sled dogs to work the mining fields and for expeditions through otherwise impassable terrain. Today, the Siberian Husky is typically kept as a house pet, though they are still frequently used as sled dogs by competitive and recreational mushers.

== Lineage and genetic structure ==
The Siberian Husky was originally developed by the Chukchi people of the Chukchi Peninsula in eastern Siberia. They were brought to Nome, Alaska in 1908 to serve as working sled dogs, and were eventually developed and used for sled dog racing.

In 2015, a DNA study indicated that the Siberian Husky, the Alaskan Malamute and the Alaskan husky share a close genetic relationship between each other and were related to Chukotka sled dogs from Siberia. They were separate to the two Inuit dogs, the Canadian Eskimo Dog and the Greenland Dog. In North America, the Siberian Husky and the Malamute both had maintained their Siberian lineage and had contributed significantly to the Alaskan husky, which was developed through crossing with European breeds. Siberian Huskies show a genetic affinity with historical East Siberian dogs and ancient Lake Baikal dogs, and can be traced to a lineage which is over 9,500 years old.

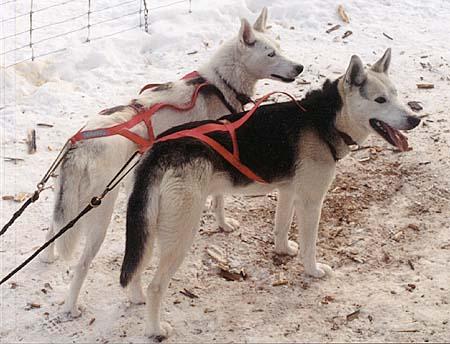
Two Seppala Siberian Sleddogs, a population of the Siberian genome identified in a 2024 genomic study

=== Population structure ===
A 2024 genomic analysis of the Siberian Husky population examined 344 individual dogs including 280 Siberian Huskies and other reference individuals from separate populations, for the purpose of mapping population structure, identifying external breed admixture, and identifying COI and harmful health mutations. The study's analysis indicated that the Siberian Husky gene pool has emerged into four genetically distinct populations: Show Siberian Huskies, Pet Siberian Huskies, Racing Siberian Huskies and Seppala Siberian Sleddogs. Around half of modern Siberian Huskies used in sleddog racing (the Racing and Seppala groups) were found to have genetic admixture from outside the Arctic dog lineage (European breeds) consistent with that mapped in the Alaskan Husky, though only the Racing group contained several individuals which mapped outside the 99% confidence interval for the Siberian genome. This suggests gene flow from unrelated breeds outside the purebred studbook has been introduced at various points in history, possibly for improvement of athletic performance in changing climates and racing conditions. The Show and Seppala populations had the smallest effective population size of the four. The Pet and Seppala populations showed the highest number of harmful alleles, and the Show population had the lowest level of heterozygosity, indicating a higher level of relatedness within that population, and thus less genetic diversity, likely due to sustained long-term inbreeding.

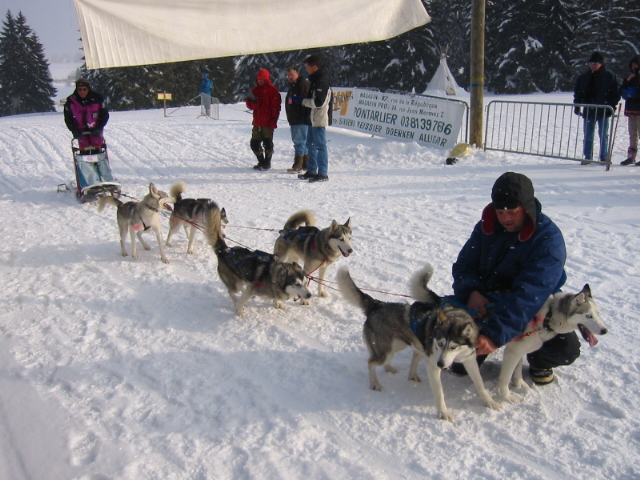
Siberian Husky team at a sled race

Several Arctic dog breeds, including the Siberian Husky, show a significant genetic closeness with the now-extinct Taimyr wolf of North Asia due to admixture. These breeds are associated with high latitudes – the Siberian Husky and Greenland Dog, also associated with arctic human populations and to a lesser extent, the Shar-Pei and Finnish Spitz. There is data to indicate admixture of between 1 and 3% between the Taymyr wolf population and the ancestral dog population of these four high-latitude breeds. This introgression could have provided early dogs living in high latitudes with phenotypic variation beneficial for adaption to a new and challenging environment. It also indicates the ancestry of present-day dog breeds descends from more than one region.

== Description ==
=== Coat ===
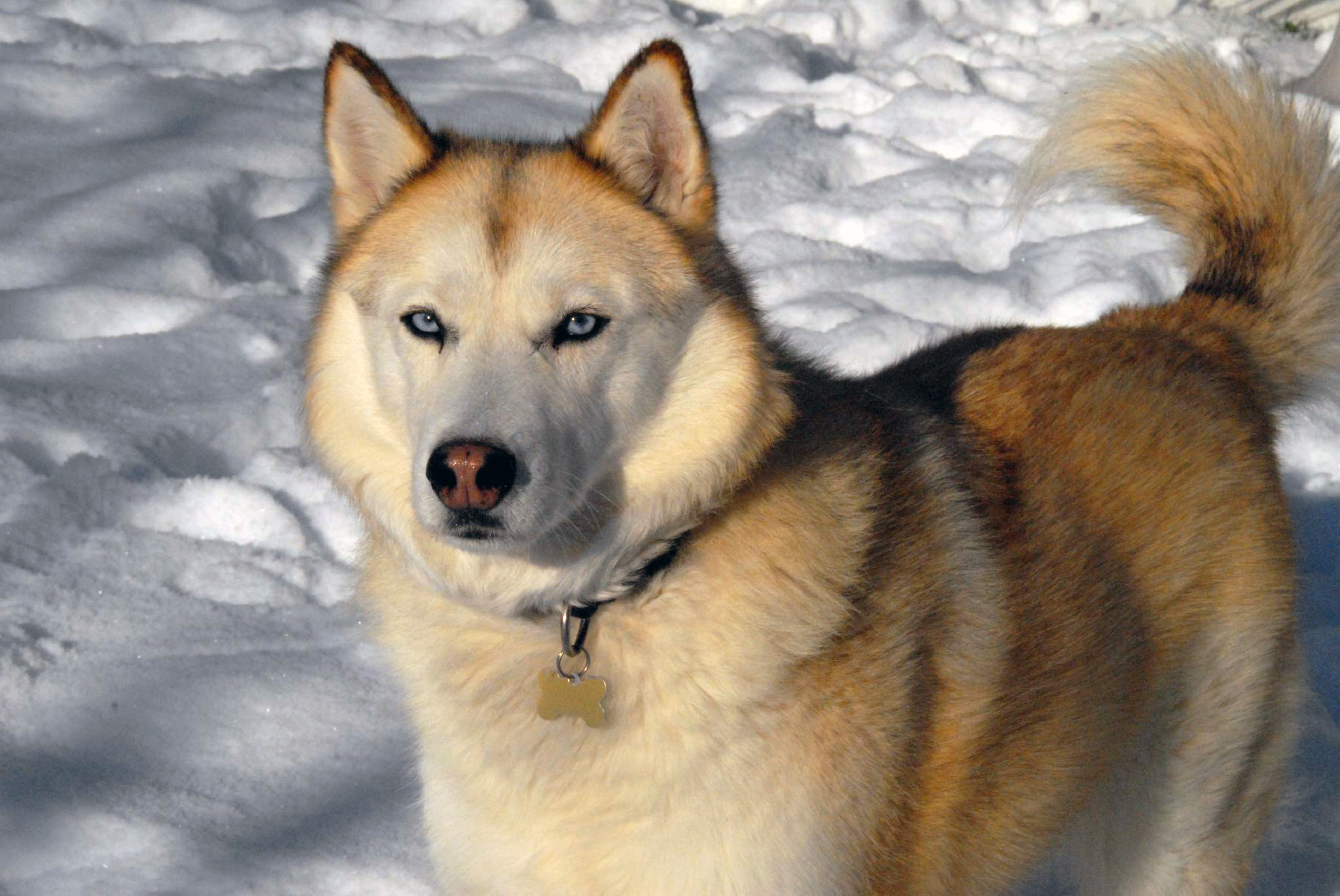
Sable female Siberian Husky

A Siberian Husky has a double coat that is thicker than that of most other dog breeds. It has two layers: a dense, finely wavy undercoat and a longer topcoat of thicker, straight guard hairs. It protects the dogs effectively against harsh Arctic winters, and also reflects heat in the summer. It is able to withstand temperatures as low as −50 to −60 °C (−58 to −76 °F). The undercoat is often absent during shedding. Their thick coats require weekly grooming. An excessively long coat, sometimes referred to as a "wooly" or "woolie" coat, is considered a fault by the breed's standard as it lacks the thicker protection of the standard coat's guard hairs, obscures the dog's clear-cut outline, causes quicker overheating during serious harness work, and becomes easily matted and encrusted with snow and ice.

Siberian Huskies come in a variety of colors and patterns, often with white paws and legs, facial markings, and tail tip. Example coat colors are black and white, copper-red and white, grey and white, pure white, and the rare "agouti" coat, though many individuals have blondish or piebald spotting. Some other individuals also have the "saddle back" pattern, in which black-tipped guard hairs are restricted to the saddle area while the head, haunches and shoulders are either light red or white. Striking masks, spectacles, and other facial markings occur in wide variety. All coat colors from black to pure white are allowed. Merle coat patterns are not permitted by the American Kennel Club (AKC) and The Kennel Club (KC). This pattern is often associated with health issues and impure breeding.

=== Eyes ===
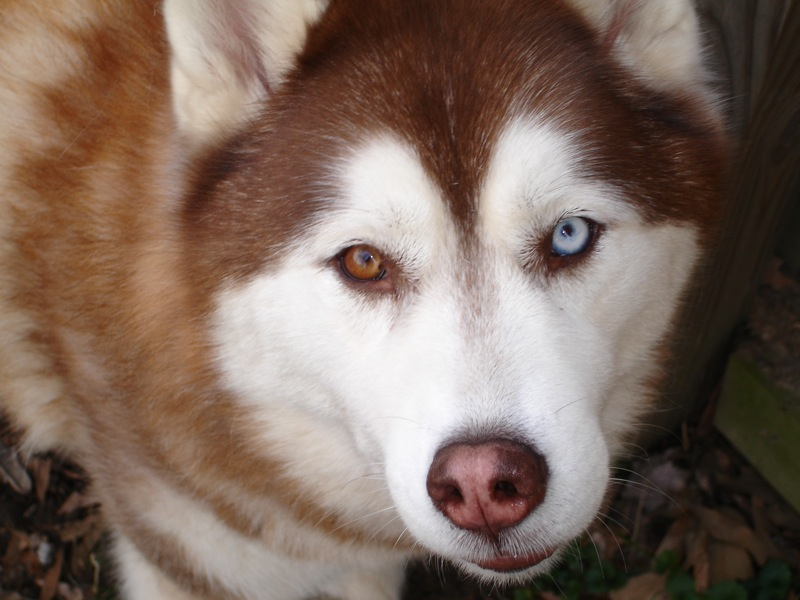
Red and white Siberian Husky with heterochromia

The American Kennel Club describes the Siberian Husky's eyes as "an almond shape, moderately spaced and set slightly obliquely". The AKC breed standard is that eyes may be brown, blue or black; one of each or particoloured are acceptable (complete is heterochromia). These eye-color combinations are considered acceptable by the American Kennel Club. The parti-color does not affect the vision of the dog.

=== Nose ===
Show-quality dogs are preferred to have neither pointed nor square noses. The nose is black in gray dogs, tan in black dogs, liver in copper-colored dogs, and may be light tan in white dogs. In some instances, Siberian Huskies can exhibit what is called "snow nose" or "winter nose". This condition is called hypopigmentation in animals. "Snow nose" is acceptable in the show ring.

=== Tail ===
Siberian Husky tails are heavily furred; these dogs will often curl up with their tails over their faces and noses in order to provide additional warmth. When curled up to sleep the Siberian Husky will cover its nose for warmth, often referred to as the "Siberian Swirl". The AKC recommends the tail should be expressive, held low when the dog is relaxed, and curved upward in a "sickle" shape when excited or interested in something.

=== Size ===
The breed standard indicates that the males of the breed are ideally between 20 and 24 inches (51 and 61 cm) tall at the withers and weighing between 45 and 60 pounds (20 and 27 kg). Females are smaller, growing to between 19 and 23 inches (48 and 58 cm) tall at the withers and weighing between 35 and 50 pounds (16 and 23 kg). The people of Nome referred to Siberian Huskies as "Siberian Rats" due to their size of 40–50 lb (18–23 kg), versus the Alaskan Malamute's size of 75–85 lb (34–39 kg).

=== Behavior ===
The Husky usually howls instead of barking. They are known to mimic high-frequency noises, such as ambulance sirens, as well as human speech. They have been described as escape artists, which can include digging under, chewing through, or even jumping over fences.

The ASPCA classifies the breed as good with children. It also states they exhibit high energy indoors, have special exercise needs, and may be destructive "without proper care".

A 6 ft (1.83 m) fence is recommended for this breed as a pet, although some have been known to overcome fences as high as 8 ft (2.44 m). Electric pet fencing may not be effective. They need the frequent companionship of people and other dogs, and their need to feel as part of a pack is very strong.

The character of the Siberian Husky is friendly and gentle. A study found an association with a gene in the breed and impulsivity, inattention, and high activity.

Siberian Huskies were ranked 77th out of 138 compared breeds for their intelligence by canine psychologist Stanley Coren. However, the rankings in Coren's published work utilized only one of three defined forms of dog intelligence, "Working and Obedience Intelligence", which focused on trainability—a dog's ability to follow direction and commands in a direct context, specifically by trial judges in a controlled course setting.

== Health ==
A 2024 UK study found a life expectancy of 11.9 years for the breed compared to an average of 12.7 for purebreeds and 12 for crossbreeds. Health issues in the breed are mainly genetic, such as seizures and defects of the eye (juvenile cataracts, corneal dystrophy, canine glaucoma and progressive retinal atrophy) and congenital laryngeal paralysis. Hip dysplasia is not often found in this breed; however, as with many medium or larger-sized canines, it can occur. The Orthopedic Foundation for Animals currently has the Siberian Husky ranked 155th out of a possible 160 breeds at risk for hip dysplasia, with only two percent of tested Siberian Huskies showing dysplasia.

Siberian Huskies used for sled racing may also be prone to other ailments, such as gastric disease, bronchitis or bronchopulmonary ailments ("ski asthma"), and gastric erosions or ulcerations.

The Siberian Husky is one of the more commonly affected breeds for X-linked progressive retinal atrophy. The condition is caused by a mutation in the RPGR gene in the breed.

Modern Siberian Huskies registered in the US are almost entirely the descendants of the 1930 Siberia imports and of Leonhard Seppala's dogs, particularly Togo. The limited number of registered foundational dogs has led to some discussion about their vulnerability to the founder effect.

== History ==
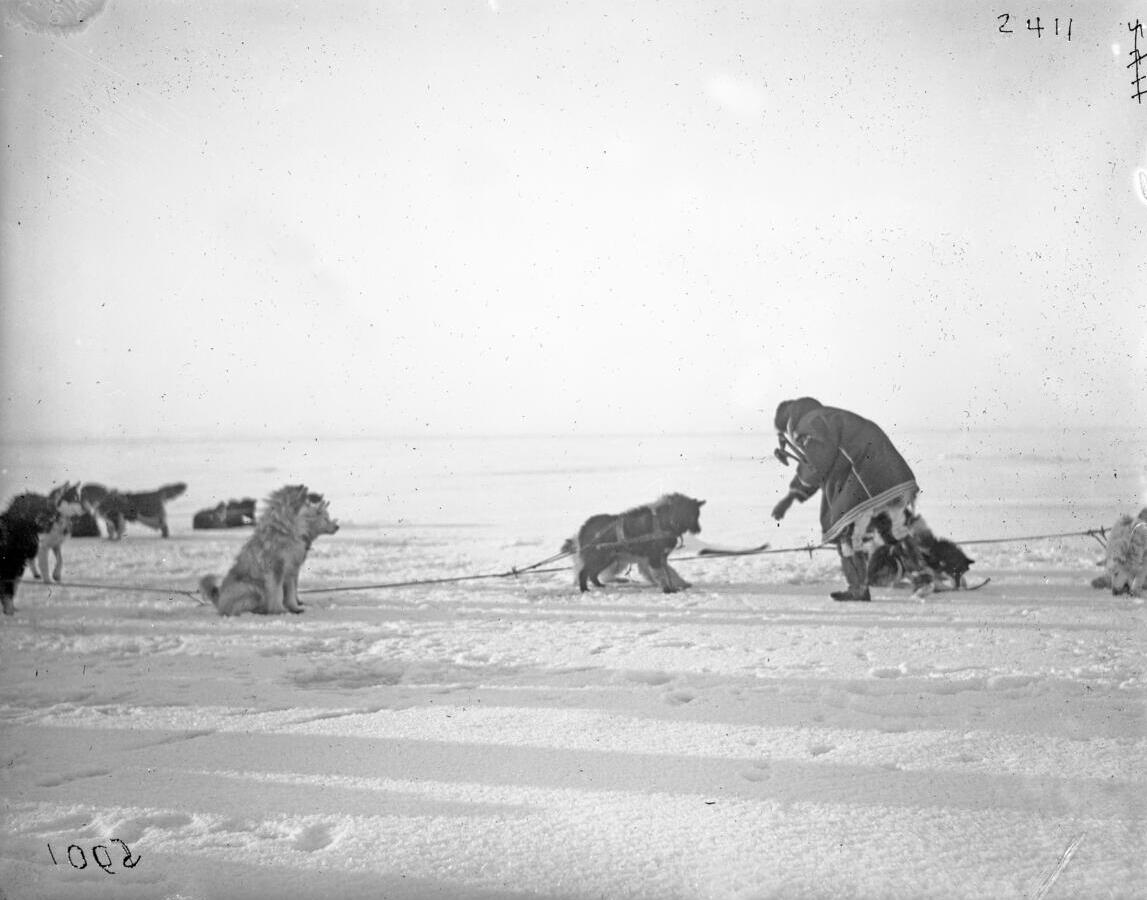
Chuchki man feeding Chukotka sled dogs, 1901

=== Prehistoric (prior to 1890s) ===
The Chukotka Sled Dog is considered the progenitor to the Siberian Husky. Developed by the Chukchi people of Russia, Chukotka sled dog teams have been used since prehistoric times to pulls sleds in harsh conditions, such as hunting sea mammals on oceanic pack ice. The phrase three dog night, meaning it is so cold that one would need three dogs in bed with them to keep warm, originated with the Chukchi who kept those dogs.

=== Origination of name and split from Chukotka Sled Dogs (1890s–1930s) ===
From the 1890s to the 1930s, sled dogs from northeast Siberia and especially Chukotka sled dogs were actively imported in vast numbers to Alaska, to transport gold miners to the Yukon, first as part of the Klondike Gold Rush, then later the "All-Alaska Sweepstakes", a 408-mile (657-km) distance dog sled race from Nome, to Candle, and back. At this time, "Esquimaux" or "Eskimo" was a common pejorative term for native Arctic inhabitants with many dialectal permutations including Uskee, Uskimay and Huskemaw. Thus dogs used by Arctic people were the dogs of the Huskies, the Huskie's dogs, and eventually simply the husky dogs. Canadian and American settlers, not well-versed on Russian geography, would distinguish the Chukotka imports by referring to them as Siberian Huskies as Chukotka is part of Siberia.

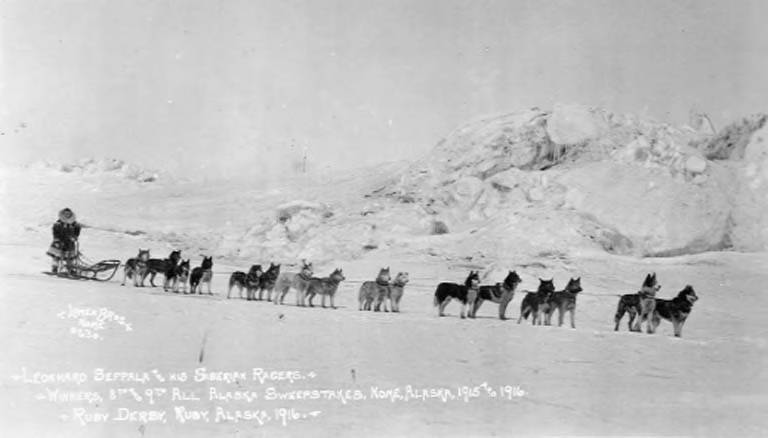
Leonhard Seppala's winning Siberian team for the 1916 All-Alaska Sweepstakes race.

Smaller, faster and more enduring than the 100- to 120-pound (45- to 54-kg) freighting dogs then in general use, they immediately dominated the Sweepstakes race. Leonhard Seppala, the foremost breeder of Siberian sled dogs of the time, participated in competitions from 1909 to the mid-1920s with a number of championships to his name.

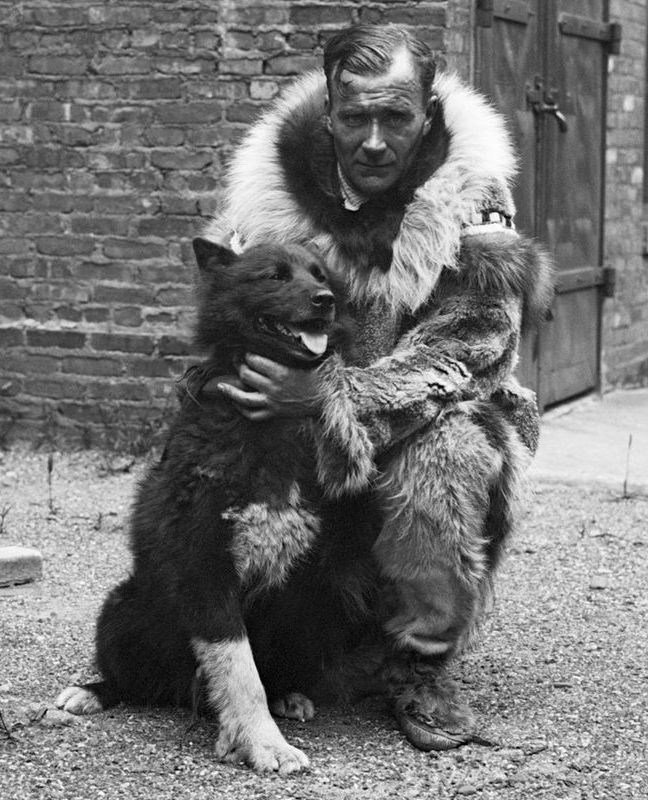
Gunnar Kaasen and Balto

On February 3, 1925, Gunnar Kaasen was the final musher in the 1925 serum run to Nome to deliver diphtheria serum from Nenana over 600 miles to Nome. This was a group effort by several sled dog teams and mushers, with the longest (264 miles or 422 km) and most dangerous segment of the run covered by Leonhard Seppala and his sled team lead dog Togo. The event is depicted in the 2019 film Togo. A measure of this is also depicted in the 1995 animated film Balto; the name of Gunnar Kaasen's lead dog in his sled team was Balto, although unlike the real dog, Balto the character was portrayed as a wolf-dog in the film. In honor of this lead dog, a bronze statue was erected at Central Park in New York City. The plaque upon it is inscribed,

Dedicated to the indomitable spirit of the sled dogs that relayed antitoxin six hundred miles over rough ice, across treacherous waters, through Arctic blizzards from Nenana to the relief of stricken Nome in the winter of 1925. Endurance · Fidelity · Intelligence

Siberian Huskies gained mass popularity with the story of the "Great Race of Mercy", the 1925 serum run to Nome, featuring Balto and Togo. Although Balto is considered the more famous, being the dog that delivered the serum to Nome after running the final 53-mile leg, it was Togo who made the longest run of the relay, guiding his musher Leonhard Seppala on a 261-mile journey that included crossing the deadly Norton Sound to Golovin, and who ultimately became a foundation dog for the Siberian Husky breed, through his progeny Toto, Molinka, Kingeak, Ammoro, Sepp III, and Togo II.

In 1930, exportation of the dogs from Siberia was halted. The same year saw recognition of the Siberian Husky by the American Kennel Club. Nine years later, the breed was first registered in Canada. The United Kennel Club recognized the breed in 1938 as the "Arctic Husky", changing the name to Siberian Husky in 1991. Seppala owned a kennel in Alaska before moving to New England, where he became partners with Elizabeth Ricker. The two co-owned the Poland Springs kennel and began to race and exhibit their dogs all over the Northeast. The kennel was sold to Canadian Harry Wheeler in 1931, following Seppala's return to Alaska

The breed's foundation stock per records and studbooks consists of:

Kree Vanka (Male, 1930 Siberia Import)

Tserko (Male, 1930 Siberia Import)

Tosca (Female, Harry x Kolyma)

Duke (Male, also known as Chapman's Duke, reportedly Ici x Wanda)

Tanta of Alyeska (Female, Tuck x Toto)

Sigrid III of Foxstand (Female, Chenuk x Molinka)

Smokey of Seppala (Male, Kingeak x Pearl)

Sepp III (Male, Togo x Dolly)

Smoky (Male, unknown parentage)

Dushka (Female, Bonzo x Nanuk)

Kabloona (Female, Ivan x Duchess)

Rollinsford Nina of Marilyn (Female, Kotlik x Nera of Marilyn)

As the breed was beginning to come to prominence, in 1933 Navy Rear Admiral Richard E. Byrd brought about 50 Siberian Huskies with him on an expedition in which he hoped to journey around the 16,000-mile coast of Antarctica. Many of the dogs were bred and trained at Chinook Kennels in New Hampshire, owned by Eva Seeley. Called Operation Highjump, the historic trek proved the worth of the Siberian Husky due to its compact size and great speed. Siberian Huskies also served in the United States Army's Arctic Search and Rescue Unit of the Air Transport Command during World War II. Their popularity was sustained into the 21st century. They were ranked 16th among American Kennel Club registrants in 2012, rising to 14th place in 2013. They have since fallen in ranking, reaching 26th of 202 as of 2024.

=== 1940s–present ===
Huskies were extensively used as sled dogs by the British Antarctic Survey in Antarctica between 1945 and 1994. A bronze monument to all of BAS's dog teams is outside its Cambridge headquarters, with a plaque listing all the dogs' names.

In 1960, the US Army undertook a project to construct an under-the-ice facility for defense and space research, Camp Century, part of Project Iceworm, involving a 150+ crew who also brought with them an unofficial mascot, a Siberian Husky named Mukluk.

Due to their high popularity combining with their high physical and mental needs, Siberian Huskies are abandoned or surrendered to shelters at high rates by new owners who do not research them fully and find themselves unable to care for them. Many decide on the breed for their looks and mythos in pop culture, and purchase pups from backyard breeders or puppy mills who do not have breeder-return contracts that responsible breeders will, designed to keep the breed out of shelters.

Sled dogs that were bred and kept by the Chukchi tribes of Siberia were thought to have gone extinct, but Benedict Allen, writing for Geographical magazine in 2006 after visiting the region, reported their survival. His description of the breeding practiced by the Chukchi mentions selection for obedience, endurance, amiable disposition, and sizing that enabled families to support them without undue difficulty.

== Human use ==
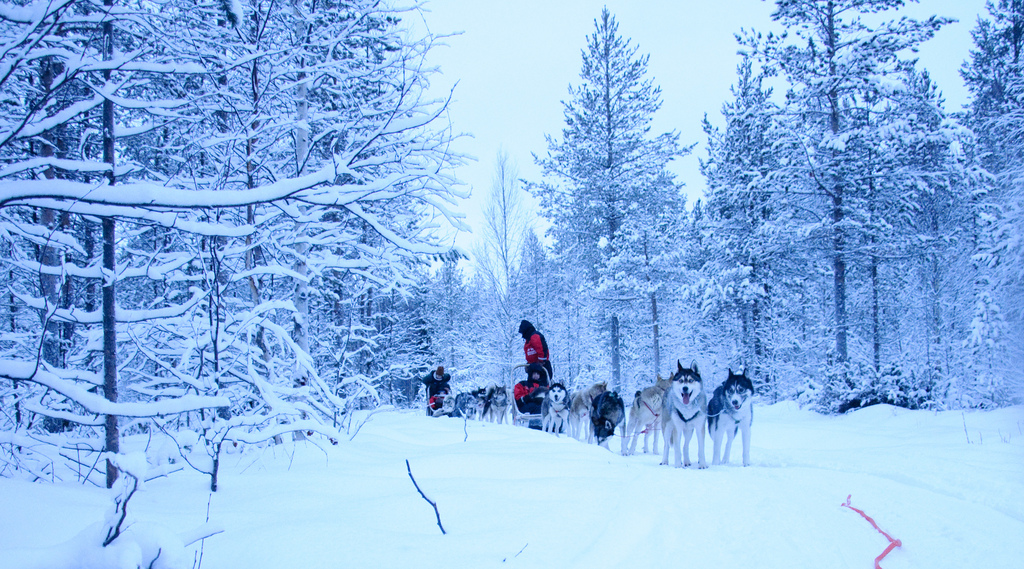
Husky sled ride in Rovaniemi, Finland

Originally, huskies were used as sled dogs in the polar regions. One can differentiate huskies from other dog types by their fast pulling-style. Modern racing huskies (also known as Alaskan huskies) represent an ever-changing crossbreed of the fastest dogs. Humans use huskies in sled-dog racing. Various companies have marketed tourist treks with dog sledges for adventure travelers in snow regions. Huskies are also kept as pets, and groups work to find new pet homes for retired racing and adventure-trekking dogs.

Many huskies, especially Siberian Huskies, are considered working dogs and are often high-energy. Exercise is extremely important for the physical and mental health of these kinds of dogs and it can also prompt a strong bond between the owner and dog. Since many owners now have huskies as pets in settings that are not ideal for sledding, other activities have been found that are good for the dog and fun for the owner.

- Rally Obedience: Owners guide their dogs through a course of difficult exercises side by side. There are typically 10 to 20 signs per course and involve different commands or tricks.
- Agility Training: A fast-paced obstacle course that deals with speed and concentration. Dogs race the clock to complete the course correctly.
- Skijoring is an alternative to sled pulling. The owner would be on skis while the dog would pull via a rope connected between the two.
- Dog hiking is an alternative for owners who live near or are able to travel to a trail. The owner travels with their dogs along trails in the wilderness. This activity allows the owner and dog to gain exercise without using the huskies' strong sense of pulling. Some companies make hiking equipment especially for dogs in which they may carry their own gear, including water, food, and bowls for each.
- Carting, also known as dryland mushing or sulky driving, is an urban alternative to dog sledding. Here, the dog can pull a cart that contains either supplies or an individual. This is also an acceptable way to use a dog's natural inclination to pull in an effective way. These carts can be bought or handmade by the individual.
- Bikejoring is an activity where the owner bikes along with their dog while they are attached to their bike through a harness which keeps both the dog and owner safe. The dog or team of dogs can be attached to a towline to also pull the biker.

== See also ==
- List of dog breeds
