= Alaskan Malamute =

Dog breed

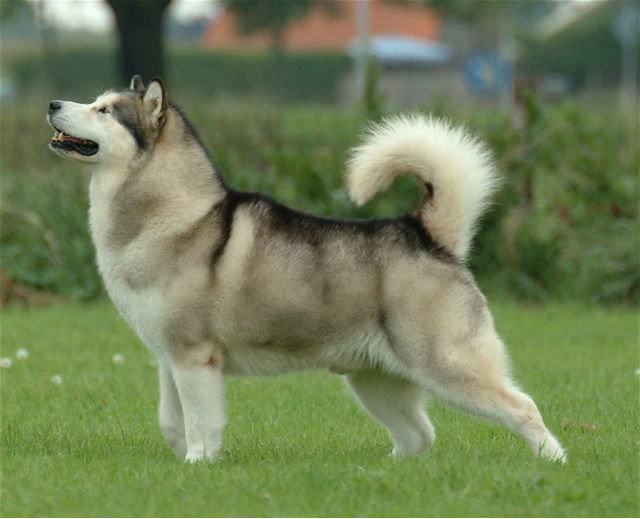
- Grey and white Alaskan Malamute
- Common nicknames: Malamute, Mally
- Origin: Alaska
Traits
Height	Males	25 inches (64 cm)
	Females	23 inches (58 cm)
Weight	Males	38 kilograms (84 lb)
	Females	34 kilograms (75 lb)
- Coat: Thick, a double coat, with plush undercoat
- Color: Grey, sable, black, or red, always with white, as well as all white and brown
- Litter size: 4–10 puppies
Kennel club standards
- AKC: standard
- Fédération Cynologique Internationale: standard
- Notes: State dog of Alaska

The Alaskan Malamute (/ˈmæləˌmjuːt/) is a large spitz-type breed of dog that was originally bred for its strength and endurance to haul heavy freight as a sled dog. It is similar to other arctic breeds such as the husky, the Greenland Dog, Canadian Eskimo Dog, the Siberian Husky, and the Samoyed.

== Lineage ==
Although it is believed that the first dogs arrived in the Americas 12,000 years ago, people and their dogs did not settle in the Arctic until the Paleo-Eskimo people 4,500 years ago, followed by the Thule people 1,000 years ago, with both originating from Siberia. Malamutes were thought to be bred by the Malimiut Inupiaq people of Alaska's Norton Sound region.

The Malamute has been identified as a basal breed that predates the emergence of the modern breeds in the 19th century. A study in 2013 showed that the Alaskan Malamute has a similar East Asian origin to, but is not clearly related to, the Greenland dog and the Canadian Eskimo dog, though it contains a possible admixture of the Siberian husky.

In 2015, a study using several genetic markers indicated that the Malamute, the Siberian husky, and the Alaskan husky share a close genetic relationship between each other and were related to Chukotka sled dogs from Siberia. They were separate from the two Inuit dogs, the Canadian Eskimo dog and the Greenland dog. In North America, the Malamute and the Siberian husky both maintained their Siberian lineage and contributed significantly to the Alaskan husky, which showed evidence of crossing with European breeds that was consistent with this breed being created in post-colonial North America. DNA extracted from a 9,500-year-old dog, Zhokhov, named after the Siberian island, was found to have shared a common ancestor with the Greenland Dog, the Alaskan Malamute and the Siberian husky.

== Appearance ==
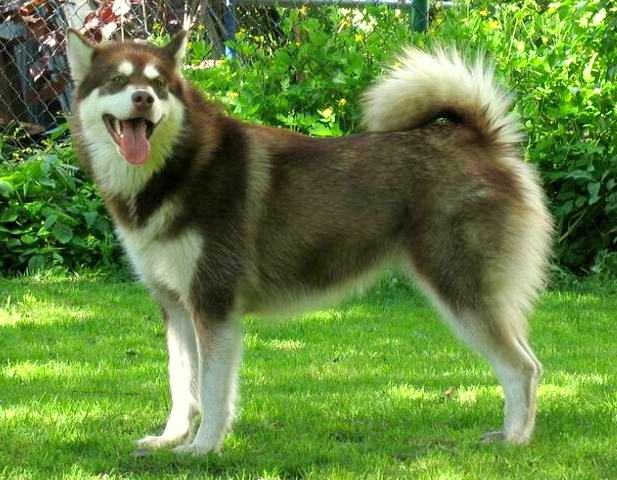
Red and white female Alaskan Malamute.

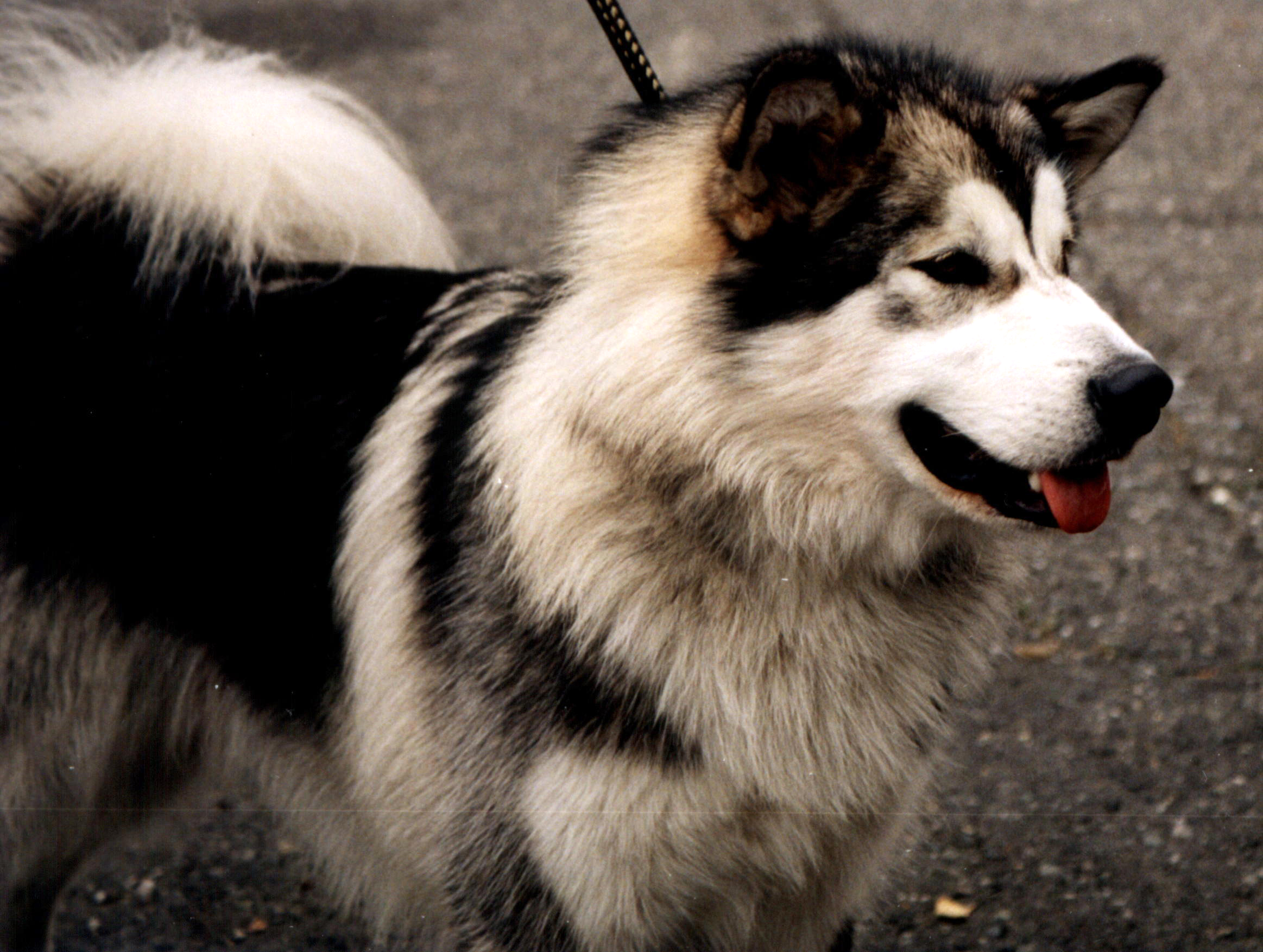
Alaskan Malamute with saddle black and white coat.

The American Kennel Club (AKC) breed standard describes a natural range of size, with a desired size of 23 inches (58 cm) tall and 75 pounds (34 kg) for females, 25 inches (64 cm) tall and 85 pounds (39 kg) for males. Heavier individuals (90 lb (41 kg)) and dogs smaller than 75 pounds (34 kg) are commonly seen. There is often a marked size difference between males and females. Weights upwards of 100 pounds (45 kg) are also seen.

The Alaskan Malamute is double coated. The undercoat has an oily and woolly texture and can be as thick as two inches. The outer guard coat is coarse and stands off the body longer at the withers but not more than one inch off the sides of the body. Ears are small in proportion to the head and stand firmly erect when at attention. The Alaskan Malamute is a heavy dog, with a more formidable nature and structure than the Siberian Husky, which is bred for speed. The Alaskan Malamute is bred for power and endurance, which is its original function and what the standard of the breed requires of Alaskan Malamute breeders.

The usual colors are various shades of grey and white, sable and white, black and white, seal and white, red and white, or solid white. There are a wide range of markings in the breed including face markings, blazes, a splash at the nape of the neck, and a collar or half collar. White is often the predominant color on the body, parts of the legs, feet, and part of the markings of the face. In terms of color variants, some Malamutes exhibit a dark grey to buff-colored undertone around their trimmings and white areas, presenting with a color-linked gene known as agouti. Two agouti alleles, with the possibility of a third, appear to be found in Malamutes: aw (agouti pattern or wolf/wild pattern), at (tan point pattern or black pattern), and awat (heterozygous agouti or dark agouti).

The eyes of the Alaskan Malamute are almond shaped and varied shades of brown; however, the darker eye is preferred. Lighter shades are permissible only in red-coated and white-coated Malamutes. Purebred Alaskan Malamutes will not have blue eyes, which are considered highly undesirable. The physical build of the Malamute is compact and strong with substance, bone and snowshoe feet.

According to the AKC breed standard, the Malamute's tail is well furred and is carried over the back like a waving plume. Corkscrew tails (commonly seen in the Akita) are occasionally seen but are faulted in the AKC breed standard. The Malamutes' well-furred tails aid in keeping them warm when they curl up in the snow. They are often seen wrapping the tail around their nose and face, which presumably protects them against such harsh weather elements as blowing snow. Their ears are generally upright, wedge shaped, small in proportion to the head, and set to the side of the skull. The muzzle is deep and broad, tapering slightly from the skull to the nose. Nose and gums are black, but some Malamutes have a snow nose, which is black with a pink undertone that can get darker or lighter, depending on the season.

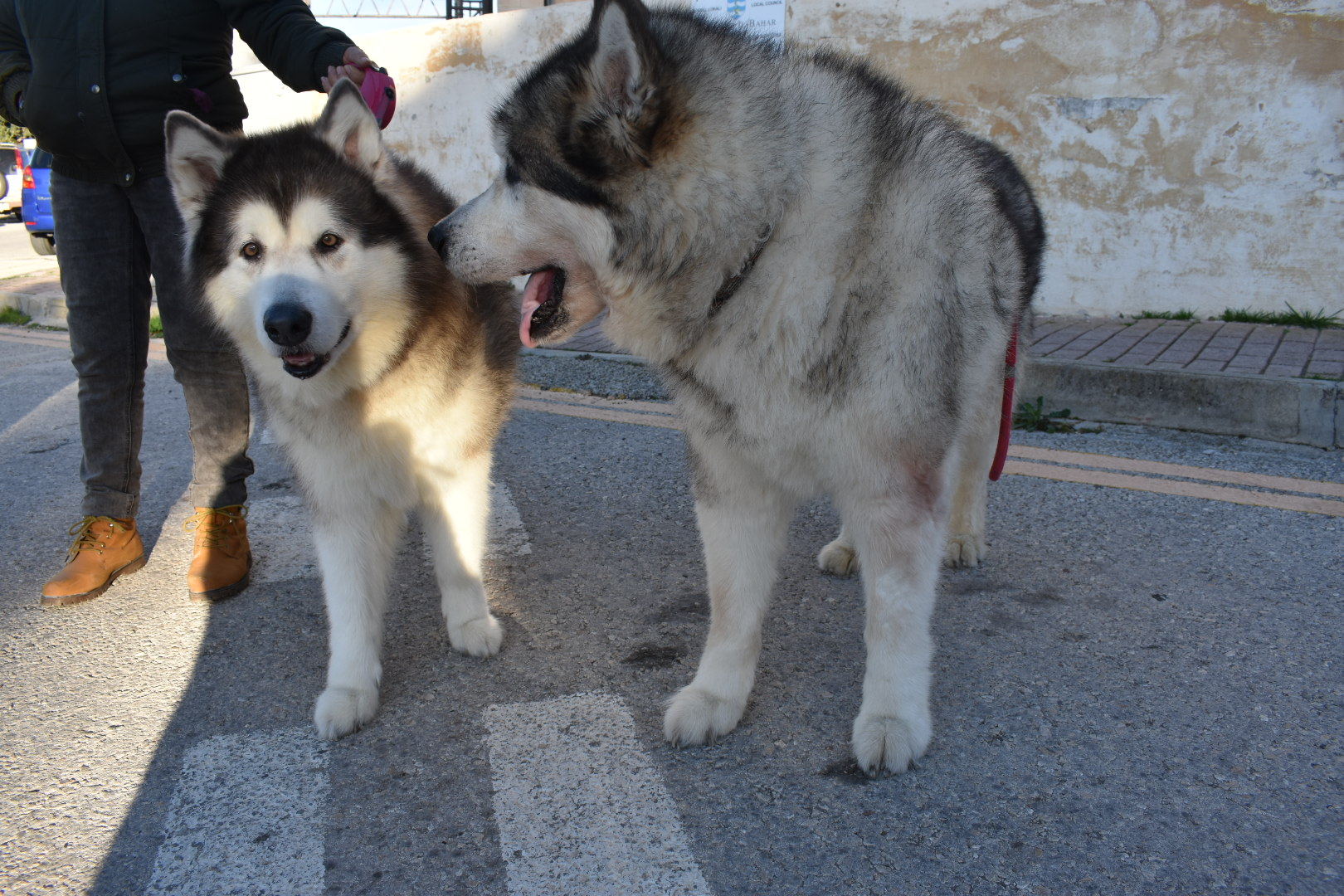
Alaskan Malamute siblings; female (left) and male (right).

== Health ==
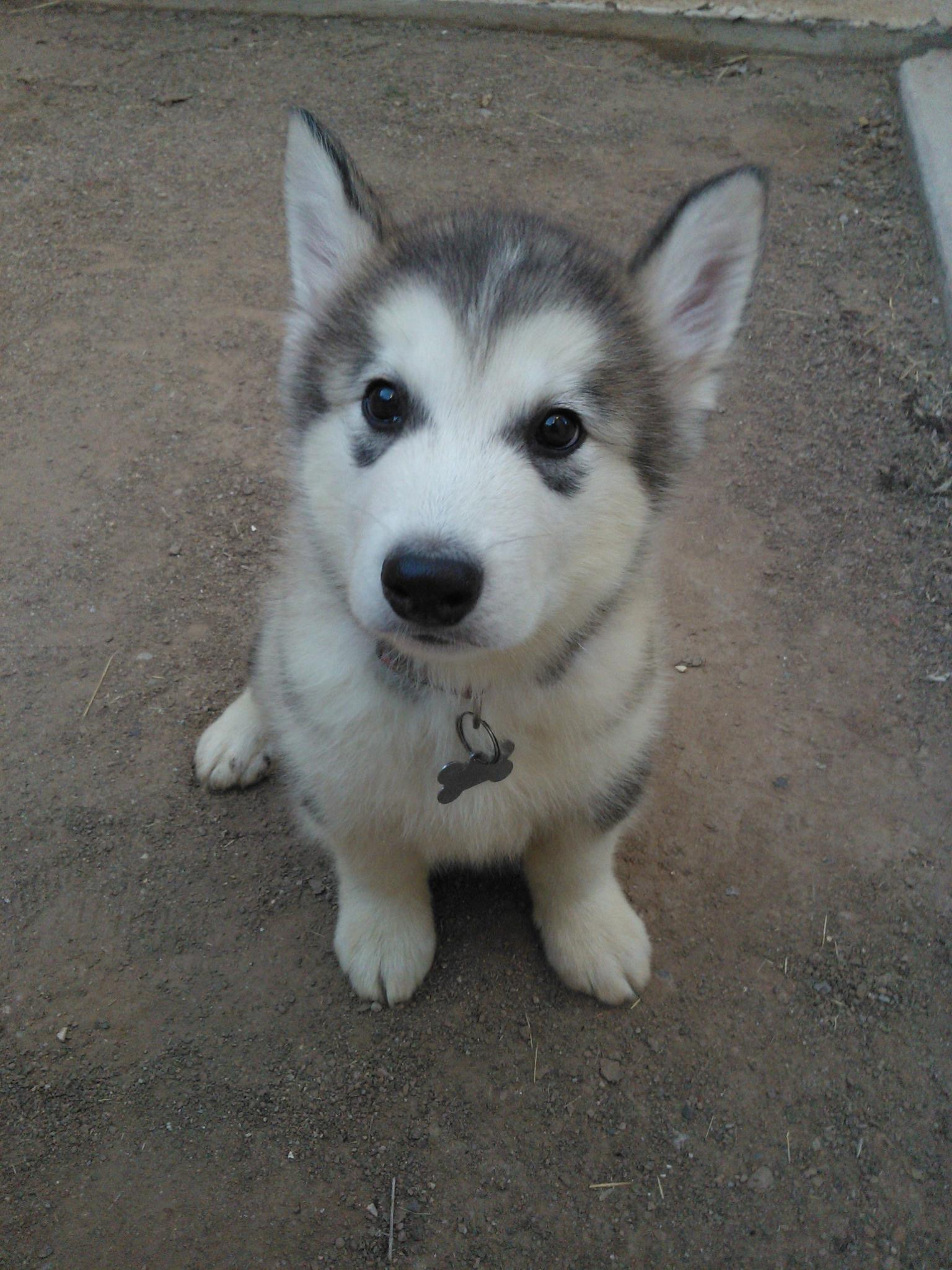
Light grey and white Alaskan Malamute puppy – two months old.

A 2024 UK study found an average life expectancy of 11.3 years, compared to an average of 12.7 for purebreeds and 12 for crossbreeds.

The most commonly reported health problems of Alaskan Malamutes, in the 2004 UK Kennel Club survey (based on a sample size of 64 dogs), were musculoskeletal (hip dysplasia) and hereditary cataracts. Additional health issues, the origins of which are unknown, include epilepsy, congenital heart disease, kidney problems, and skin disorders.

Other health issues in Malamutes include elbow dysplasia, inherited polyneuropathy, osteochondrodysplasia, cerebellar hypoplasia, heart defects, and eye problems (particularly cataract and progressive retinal atrophy). A growing problem among arctic dog breeds, including the Alaskan Malamute, is canine diabetes, with onset occurring typically in middle age (5 to 7 years).

Another health issue with Malamutes is zinc deficiency, as this breed cannot easily absorb zinc, which can lead to infections or skin and coat problems.

Thyroid disorders are the most common hormonal issue in dogs, and hypothyroidism is common in Malamutes.

== History ==
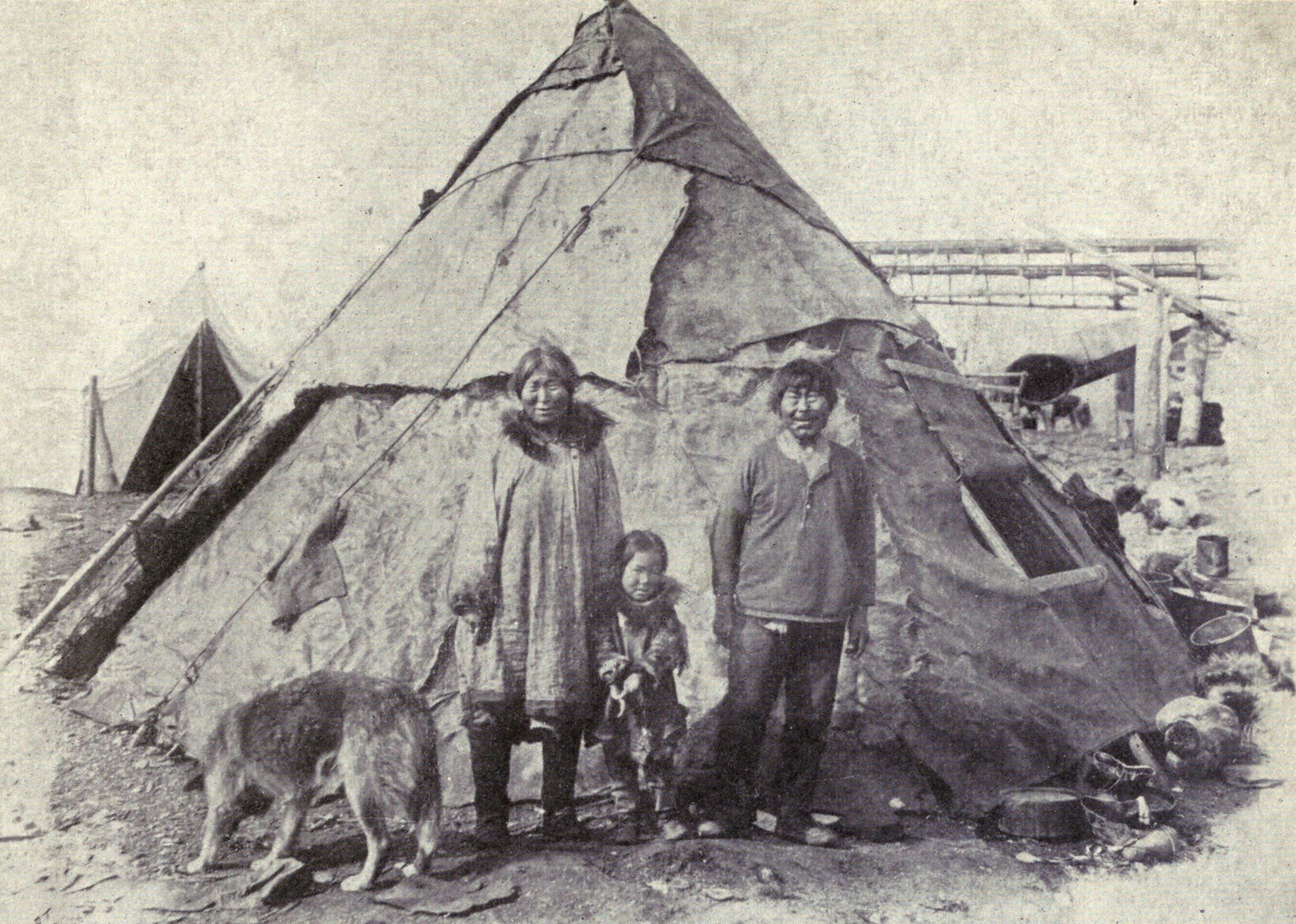
An Inupiat family with a Malamute from 1915.

The Alaskan Malamute had a prominent role with their human companions as a utilitarian dog, working, hunting, and living alongside humans. The dogs were renowned for their excellent hunting abilities and were used to hunt large predators such as bears. They also aided their owners in finding seals by alerting them to seal blowholes. The interdependent relationship between the Malamute and their dogs fostered prosperity among both and enabled them to flourish in the inhospitable land above the Arctic Circle.

For a brief period during the Klondike Gold Rush of 1896, the Malamute and other sled dogs became extremely valuable to recently landed prospectors and settlers and were frequently crossbred with imported breeds.

Breed recognition came in 1935, largely through the efforts of Mrs. Eva B. Seeley. At that time many dogs were of unknown ancestry. Those who appeared purebred were used for breeding, others weeded out. After a few years, the registry was closed.

Losses from service in World War II all but eliminated the breed. In 1947 there were estimated to be only about 30 registered dogs left, so the studbook was reopened. Robert J. Zoller became involved in the breed and took this opportunity to combine M'’Loot and Hinman/Irwin dogs with selected Kotzebues to create what became the Husky-Pak line. All modern Malamutes are descended from the early strains and show combinations of characteristics to a greater or lesser degree. Thus the natural differences we see today.
— AKC

The Malamute dog has had a distinguished history; aiding Rear Admiral Richard Byrd to the South Pole, and the miners who came to Alaska during the Gold Rush of 1896, as well as serving in World War II primarily as search and rescue dogs in Greenland, although also used as freighting and packing dogs in Europe. This dog was never destined to be a racing sled dog; it was used for heavy freighting, pulling hundreds, perhaps thousands of pounds of supplies to villages and camps in groups of at least four dogs for heavy loads.

The University of Washington's husky mascot is an Alaskan Malamute. In 2010, the Alaskan Malamute was named the official state dog of Alaska. Lathrop High School in Fairbanks, Alaska uses a Malamute as its official mascot.

== See also ==
- Alaskan husky
- Coat of arms of Yukon
- Flag of Yukon
- List of dog breeds
