= Chukotka sled dog =

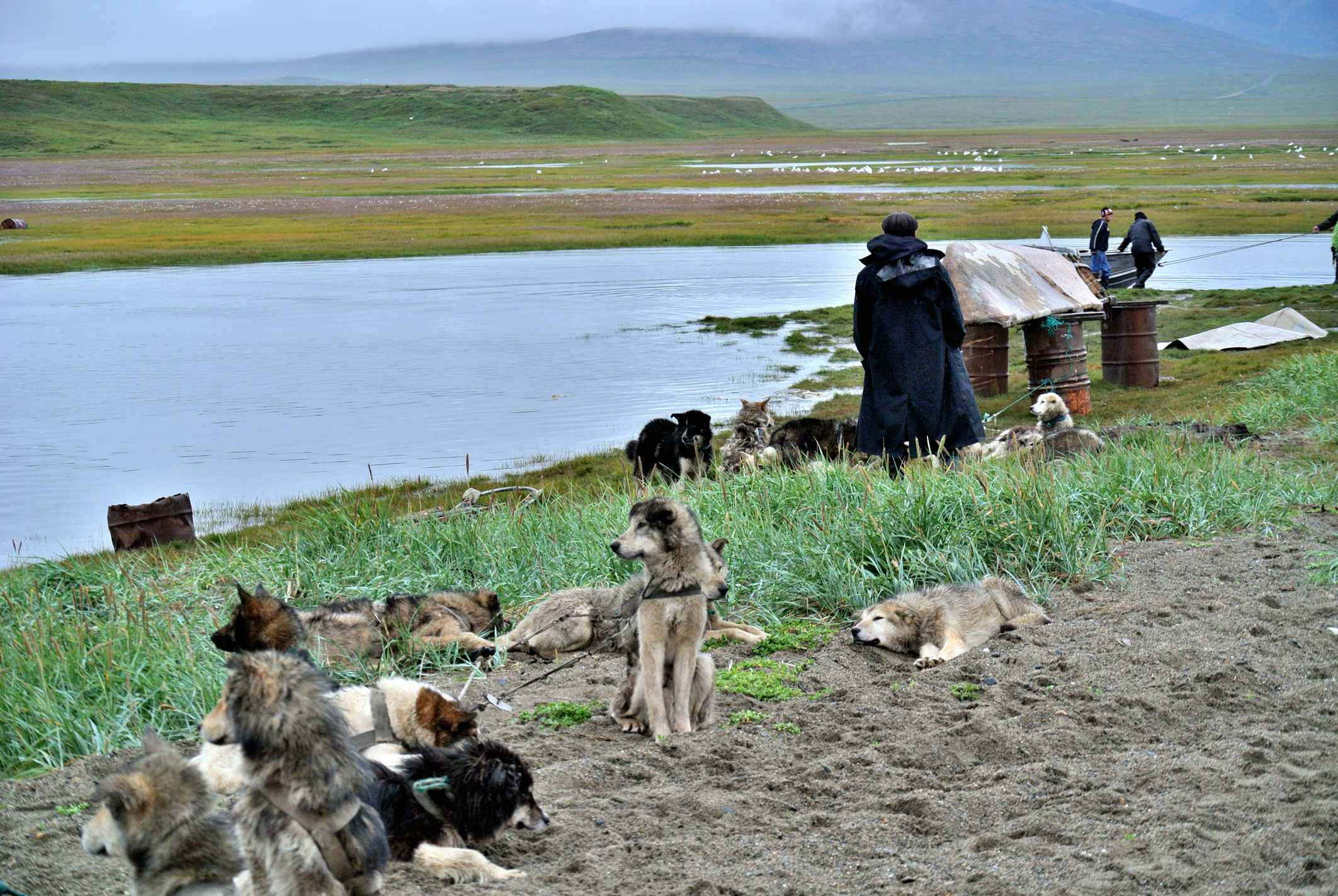
- Other names: Chukchi sled dog, Siberian Husky
- Origin: Russia
Traits
- Height: 53-65 cm
- Coat: double
- Color: grey, red, fawn, white, brown, black, piebald, tan

The Chukotka sled dog (Russian: чуко́тская ездова́я, [t]chukótskaya yezdováya, "Chukotsky riding dog", literally "Chukotka riding") is the aboriginal spitz breed of dog indigenous to the Chukchi people of Russia.

Chukotka sled dog teams have been used since prehistoric times to pull sleds in harsh conditions, such as when hunting sea mammals on oceanic pack ice. While most famous as the progenitor of the Siberian Husky (and related to the Alaskan Malamute), Chukotka sled dogs almost died out during the Soviet era due to lack of interest in preserving genetically purebred examples and have only recently made a resurgence. In 1999, the Russian Kynologic Federation (RKF) approved the first official standard of the breed.

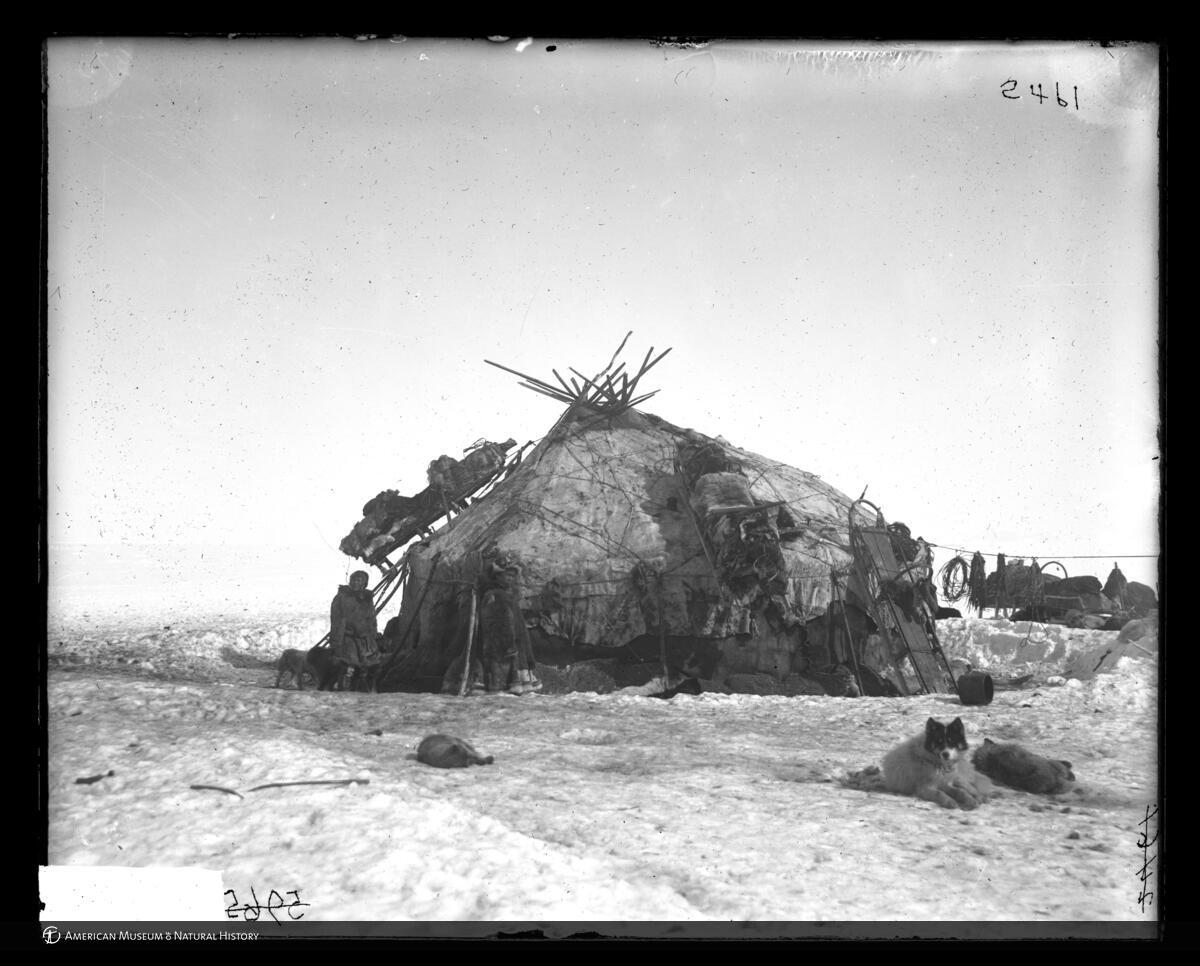
Chukchi House with sled dog, 1901.

== History ==
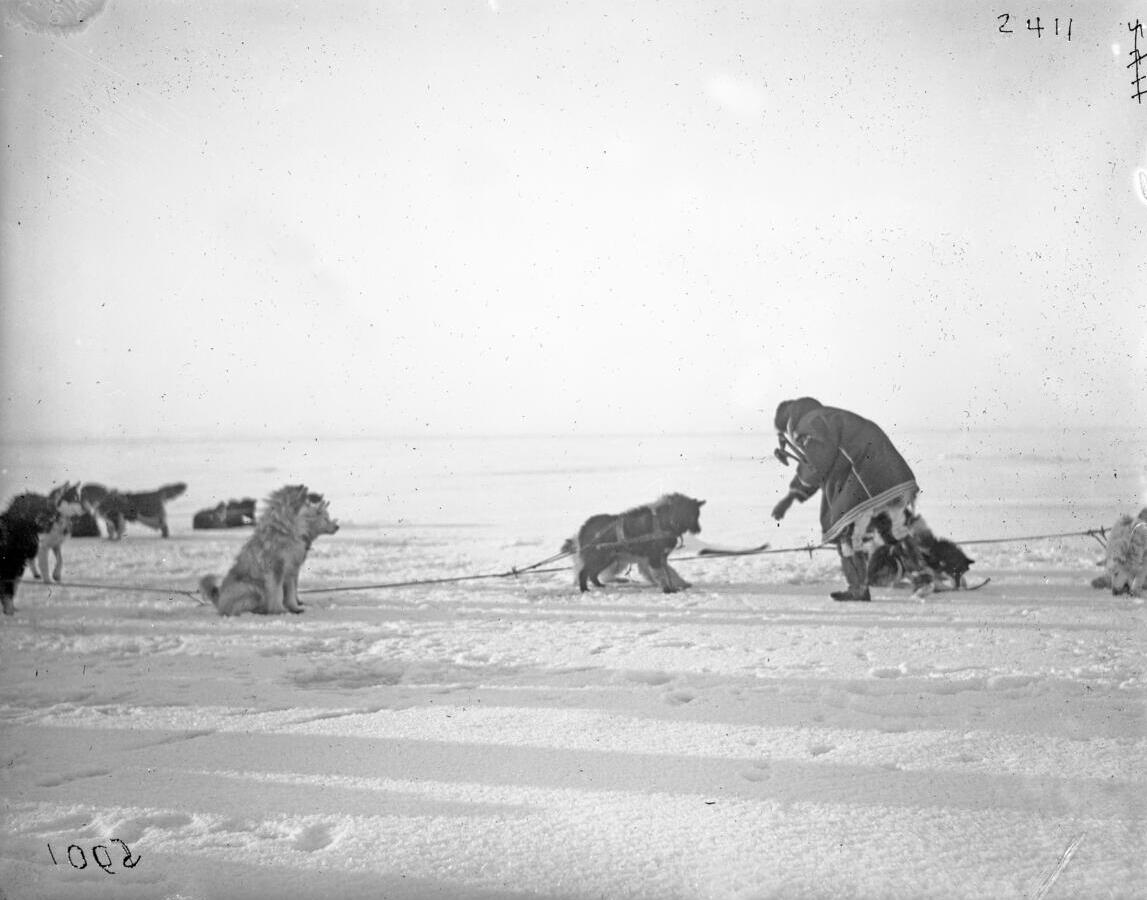
Chukchi man feeding Chukotka sled dogs, 1901.

The Chukotka sled dog was developed by the Chukchi people as a hardy, reliable method of hunting marine mammals on sea ice and transportation in the mountainous tundra of the Chukchi Peninsula, where windswept slopes prevent the accumulation of snow. Archeological evidence from before 500 AD indicates that local populations were relying heavily on whales as a food source and that dogsled was the primary means of transporting marine mammals to human settlements.

Sportswoman and author M. G. Dmitrieva-Sulima would describe them as a unique breed in her 1911 book, "Laika and hunting with it."

=== Split with Siberian huskies ===
From the 1890s to the 1930s, Chukotka sled dogs were actively exported to Alaska, to transport gold miners to the Yukon as part of the Klondike Gold Rush. then later for the "All-Alaska Sweepstakes," a 408-mile (657-km) distance dog sled race in Alaska. At this time, "Esquimaux" or "Eskimo" was a common pejorative term for native North American Arctic inhabitants, with many dialectal permutations including Uskee, Uskimay and Huskemaw. Thus dogs used by Arctic people were the dogs of the Huskies, the Huskie's dogs, and eventually simply the husky dogs. Canadian and American settlers, not well versed on Russian geography, would distinguish the Chukotka imports by referring to them as Siberian huskies, as Chukotka is part of Siberia.

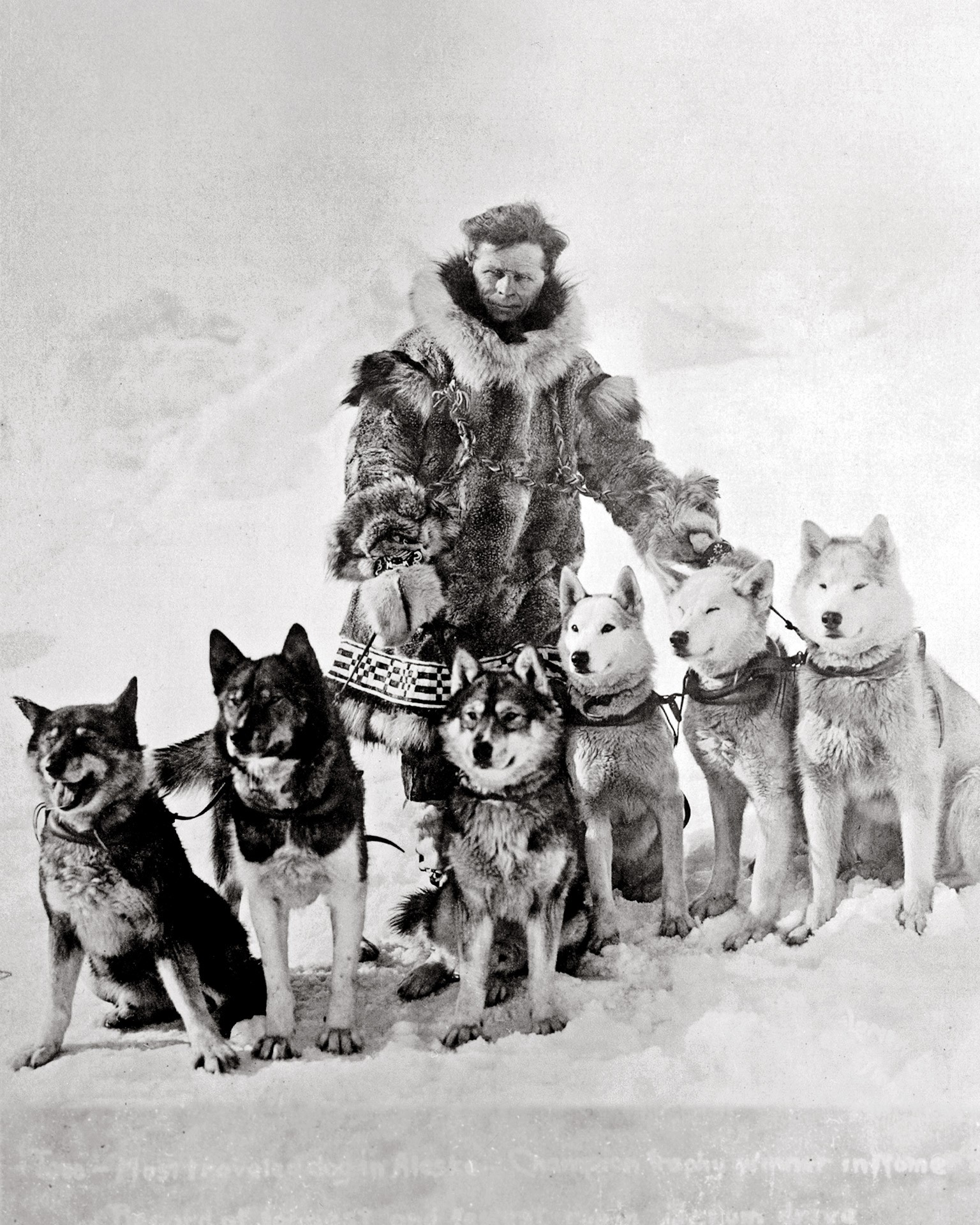
Leonhard Seppala with his dogs.

In 1913, Leonhard Seppala inherited a team of Chukotka sled dogs by chance. Jafet Lindeberg, his friend and supervisor at Pioneer Mining Company, had brought the puppies from Siberia as a gift for the explorer Roald Amundsen, whom he hoped would use them for his upcoming expedition to the North Pole. Seppala was assigned to train the dogs. "I literally fell in love with them from the start", he recalled; "I could hardly wait for sledding snow to start their training". When Amundsen cancelled his trip a few weeks after the puppies arrived in Nome, Lindeberg gave them to Seppala. Smaller, faster and more enduring than the 100- to 120-pound (45- to 54-kg) freighting dogs then in general use, Siberian huskies immediately dominated the Sweepstakes race.

In 1930, the Soviet Union halted the exportation of dogs from Siberia and the American Kennel Club recognized the Siberian husky as a breed. Dogs in the Soviet Union at the time continued as Chukotka sled dogs, while dogs in the United States and Canada were the foundational stock of the Siberian Husky.

In the 1950s and 60s, improvements in infrastructure and mechanized travel coupled with a prohibition on subsistent whaling resulted in the collapse of indigenous sled dog populations in Chukotka. Sled dog populations continued to decline until 1988 when a regional survey revealed only 1594 dogs, of which approximately 400 were purebred. Following the collapse of the Soviet Union, widespread food insecurity in Russia coupled with a special dispensation in whaling for native Chukchi people, have contributed to a resurging interest in preserving Chukotka sled dogs in the Chukotka Peninsula. There are estimated to be 4000 Chukotka sled dogs today, although it is unclear how many are purebred. In an effort to preserve the breed, the Chukotka sled dog was recognized by the Russian Kynologic Federation (RKF) in 1999.

== Characteristics ==
Chukotka sled dogs are prized for their high endurance, strength, ability to work and trainability. They should have a friendly disposition as required for working in teams. They have double coats and come in a variety of colors. Males and females of this dog are 53–65 cm at the withers. Roald Amundsen wrote: "At dog sledding these Russians and Chukchi are ahead of everyone, whom I could see." Unlike other Arctic dogs which are multifunctional, Chukotka sled dogs are selected strictly for fuel efficiency during long-distance runs.

== Popular culture ==
- Fyodor Konyukhov and Viktor Simonov crossed the Arctic Ocean in 46 days and reached the shores of Ward Hunt Island (Canada) Chukotka Sled Dogs.
- A monument is being erected in Karelia in honor of Cherk, a Chukotka Sled Dog who crossed the Arctic three times.
