= Slider =

Slider or Sliders may refer to:

== Arts ==
- K.K. Slider, a fictional character within the Animal Crossing franchise
- The Slider, a 1972 album by T. Rex
- Sliders (TV series), an American science fiction and fantasy television series
- Slider, a recurring character in the animated television series Cyberchase

== Recreation ==
- Pulk § Slider
- Bum slider
- Foam slider

== Sports ==
- Slider (cricket), a type of delivery bowled by a wrist spin bowler
- Slider (pitch), a breaking ball pitch in baseball
- Participant in a winter sport related to sledding
- Slider, mascot for the Major League Baseball team Cleveland Indians/Guardians

== Technology ==
- Slider (BEAM), a robot that has a mode of locomotion by moving body parts smoothly along a surface
- Slider (computing), a graphical control element with which a user may set a value by moving an indicator
- Slider (mobile phones), a form factor of mobile phones
- Slider, a type of potentiometer

== Other uses ==
- Lerista (also sliders), a diverse genus of skinks endemic to Australia
- Slide (footwear) (also sliders), a type of light footwear that are characterized by having a loose heel
- Slider (parachuting), a small rectangular piece of fabric with a grommet near each corner
- Slider (sandwich), American term for a small hamburger
- Slider, a crash damage protection accessory for motorcycles
- Sliders, Virginia, an unincorporated community in Buckingham County, in the U.S. state of Virginia
- SLIders, individuals who can allegedly induce the street light interference phenomenon
- Trachemys, a genus of turtles belonging to the family Emydidae

== See also ==
- Slide (disambiguation)
- Sliding (disambiguation)
