= Slide =

Slide or Slides may refer to:

== Places ==
- Slide, California, former name of Fortuna, California

== Arts, entertainment, and media ==
=== Music ===
==== Albums ====
- Slide (Lisa Germano album), 1998
- Slide (George Clanton album), 2018
- Slide, by Patrick Gleeson, 2007
- Slide (Luna EP), 1993
- Slide (Madeline Merlo EP), 2022

==== Songs ====
- "Slide" (Slave song), 1977
- "Slide" (The Big Dish song), 1986
- "Slide" (Goo Goo Dolls song), 1998
- "Slide" (Calvin Harris song), 2017
- "Slide" (FBG Duck song), 2018
- "Slide" (French Montana song), 2019
- "Slide" (H.E.R. song), 2019
- "Slide" (Madeline Merlo song), 2022
- "Slide" (¥$ song), 2024
- "Step Back"/"Slide", by Superheist, 2001
- "Slide", by Chris Brown from Breezy
- "Slide", by Dido from No Angel
- "Slide", by Doechii from Alligator Bites Never Heal
- "The Slide", by Cowboy Junkies from One Soul Now
- "S.L.I.D.E" by Tory Lanez, 2026

==== Other uses in music ====
- Slide (musical ornament), a musical embellishment found particularly in Baroque music
- Slide (tune type), a tune type in Irish traditional music, common to the Sliabh Luachra area
- Slide, a 1970s disco side project of Rod McKuen's
- The Slide, a jukebox musical using songs by The Beautiful South
- Bent note, or slide, articulation
- Glissando, or slide, articulation
- Legato, or slide, articulation

=== Musical instruments ===
- Slide guitar, a guitar playing technique
- Slide (wind instrument), part of an instrument used to vary the length of a tube
  - Slide whistle, a musical instrument using a slide
  - Trombone, a musical instrument using a slide
    - Sackbut, the Renaissance and early Baroque forerunner of the trombone

=== Other uses in arts, entertainment, and media ===
- Slide (dance), a dance move giving the impression of gliding around effortlessly
- Slide (TV series), an Australian television drama
- Slide (Bluey), a television episode
- "The Slide" (The Amazing World of Gumball), a television episode
- The Slide, a 1966 British science fiction radio serial

== Fashion ==
- Slide (footwear), a kind of shoe
- Slide, also known as a neckerchief slide or woggle, is a ring to hold a neckerchief on a Scout's neck
- Hair clip, also known as a hair slide

== Recreation and sports ==
- Slide (baseball), dropping to the ground when going into a base to avoid being tagged
- Slide (skateboarding), skateboarding tricks
- Playground slide, a smooth, sloped downward surface on which children slide while sitting
- Sliding tackle, a skill in soccer
- Water slide, a form of amusement in which people slide down a wet surface into a swimming pool
- Losing slide, an uninterrupted string of contests lost

== Technology ==
- Slide (form), a slide-out mobile phone form factor
- Slide (hoverboard), a hoverboard developed by Lexus
- Tri-glide slide, an item that allows straps to be pulled through it to adjust their length
- Evacuation slide, an inflatable slide used to evacuate an aircraft
- Google Slides, a web-based presentation program offered by Google
- Jakarta Slide, defunct content management system software
- Linear-motion bearing, a bearing designed to provide free motion in one dimension
- Microscope slide, a thin glass sheet used to hold objects for examination
- Photographic slide or transparency, a positive photograph used for projection
- Pistol slide, the upper half of a semi-automatic pistol, containing the barrel, sights, and ejection port
- Slide edit, a video editing term for moving a video clip around in a timeline
- Slide rule, a simple analog calculator

== Other uses ==
- Slide (motion)
- Landslide, the movement of soil, mud or rock down a slope
  - Slide (geography), fixed or settled residue of a landslide that has stabilized
- Presentation slide, a document format used for presentations

== See also ==
- Slide Lake (disambiguation)
- Slider (disambiguation)
- Sliding (disambiguation)
