= Saucer sled =

Toy sled for winter recreation

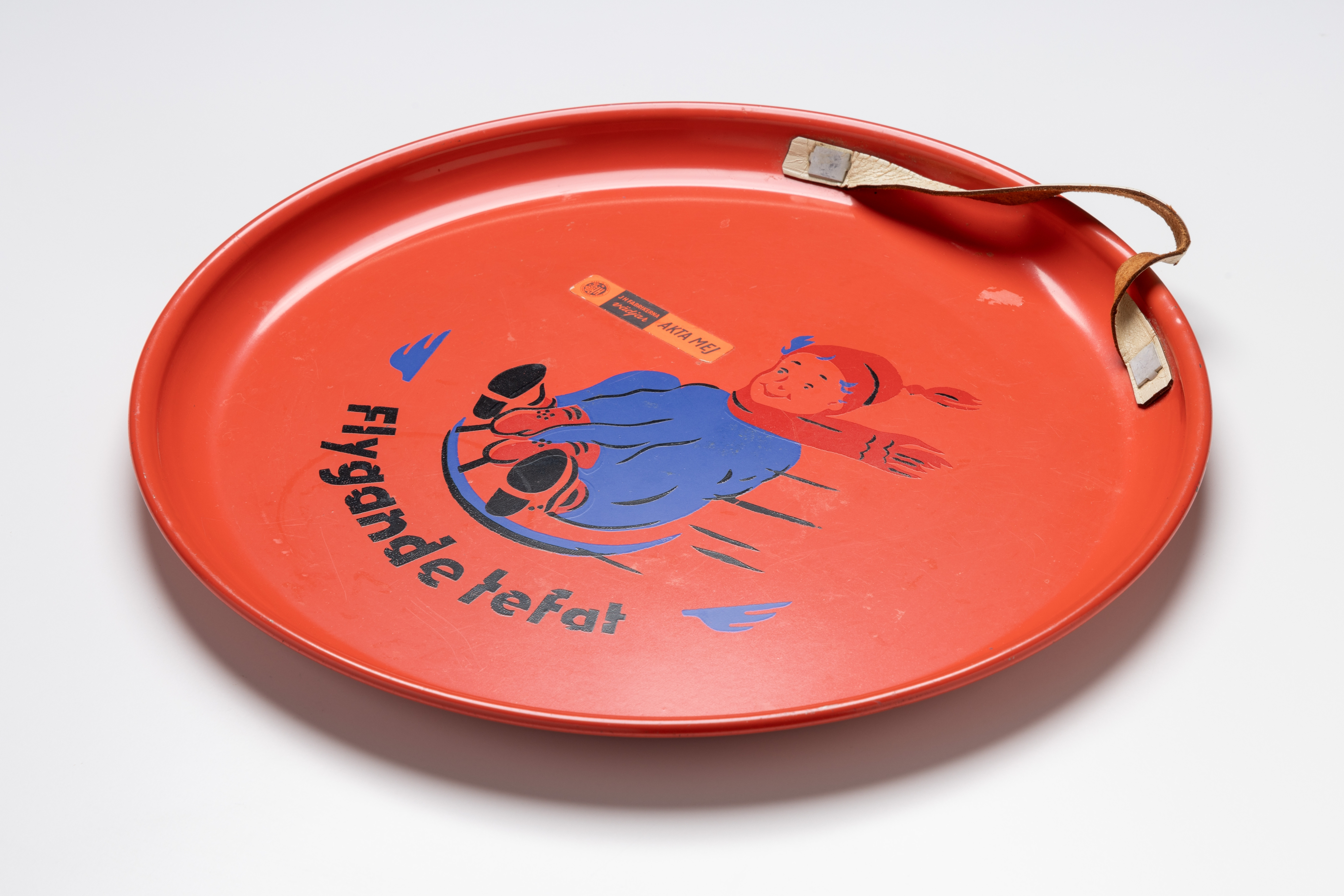
1950s Swedish saucer sled in metal

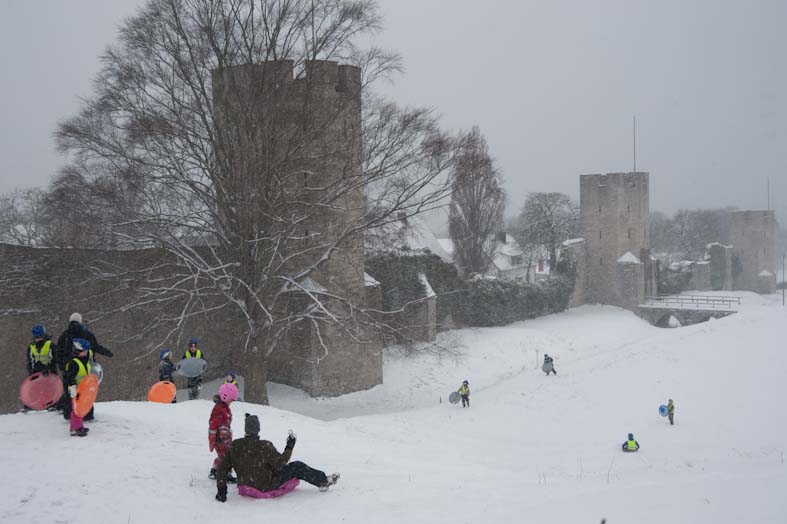
Saucers and pulks being ridden in Visby, Sweden

Saucer sleds, saucers, or flying saucers, etc. (cf. Swedish: tefat, flygande tefat), is a sled-like toy used in snowy winter recreation, consisting of a saucer-shaped piece of plastic or metal, intended as the skid, often with handles for the rider to hold onto. To ride it, the rider sits on the skid and raises their legs while sledding downhill, akin to a bum slider. A small child can optionally ride it on their knees.

Depending on the part of the world, it may be viewed as a derivative of a toboggan, pulk, or other family of sleds for winter recreation.

== History ==
An early reference in Plutarch's Life of Marius mentions the Cimbri used shields to slide down a mountain in 103 BCE.

Use of flat metal trays for recreation on snow is recorded in 1877, 1883 and 1927.

In Sweden, a commercial saucer sled was produced by manufacturer Georg Gillmert at the JH factory in Sävsjö, Sweden. Georg had seen how children and young people sledded down snowy slopes, often with a tray or something else as a seat. At the same time, the JH factory had a machine that had been used to make lids for garbage cans, which were no longer being manufactured. This brought the idea of producing saucer-shaped sleds as children's toys. Georg changed the machine so that the lids had a flange when pressed. The sheet metal lids were then painted and given a leather handle attached with two rivets. This was in the early 1950s and the space and science fiction interest of the time gave the creation the name "flying saucer" (flygande tefat).

The snow toy quickly became very popular. After a while, however, the HJ factory received complaints from mothers who had seen their children's winter clothes turn red from rust. This resulted in JH switching to producing the saucers in aluminum instead.

When cheaper plastic saucers came from other industries, the JH factory could no longer compete. At the end of the 1960s, saucer production in Sävsjö ceased.

== See also ==
- Bum slider
- Foam slider
- Sledding
