= Sled =

Land vehicle used for sliding across snow or ice

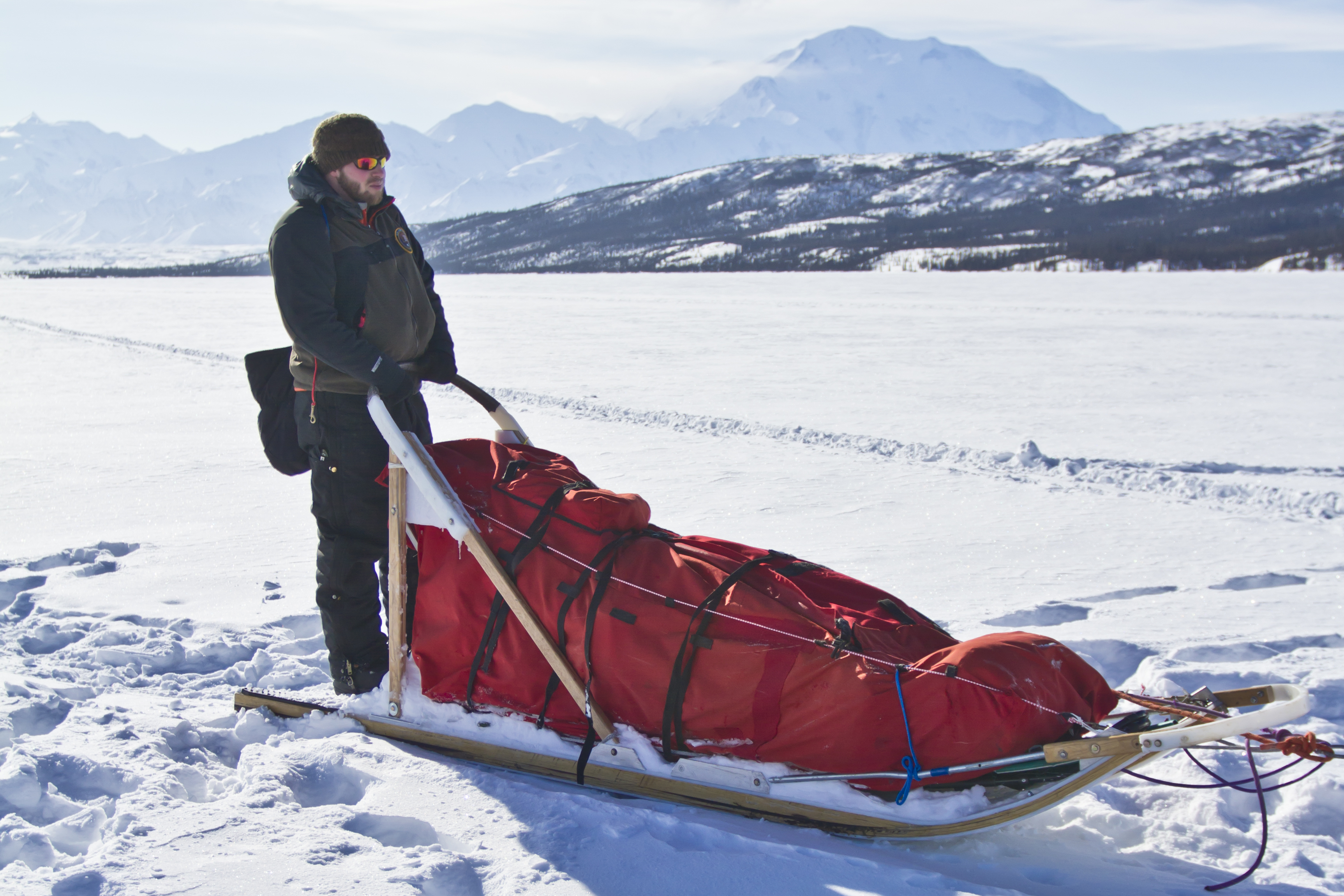
A loaded dogsled

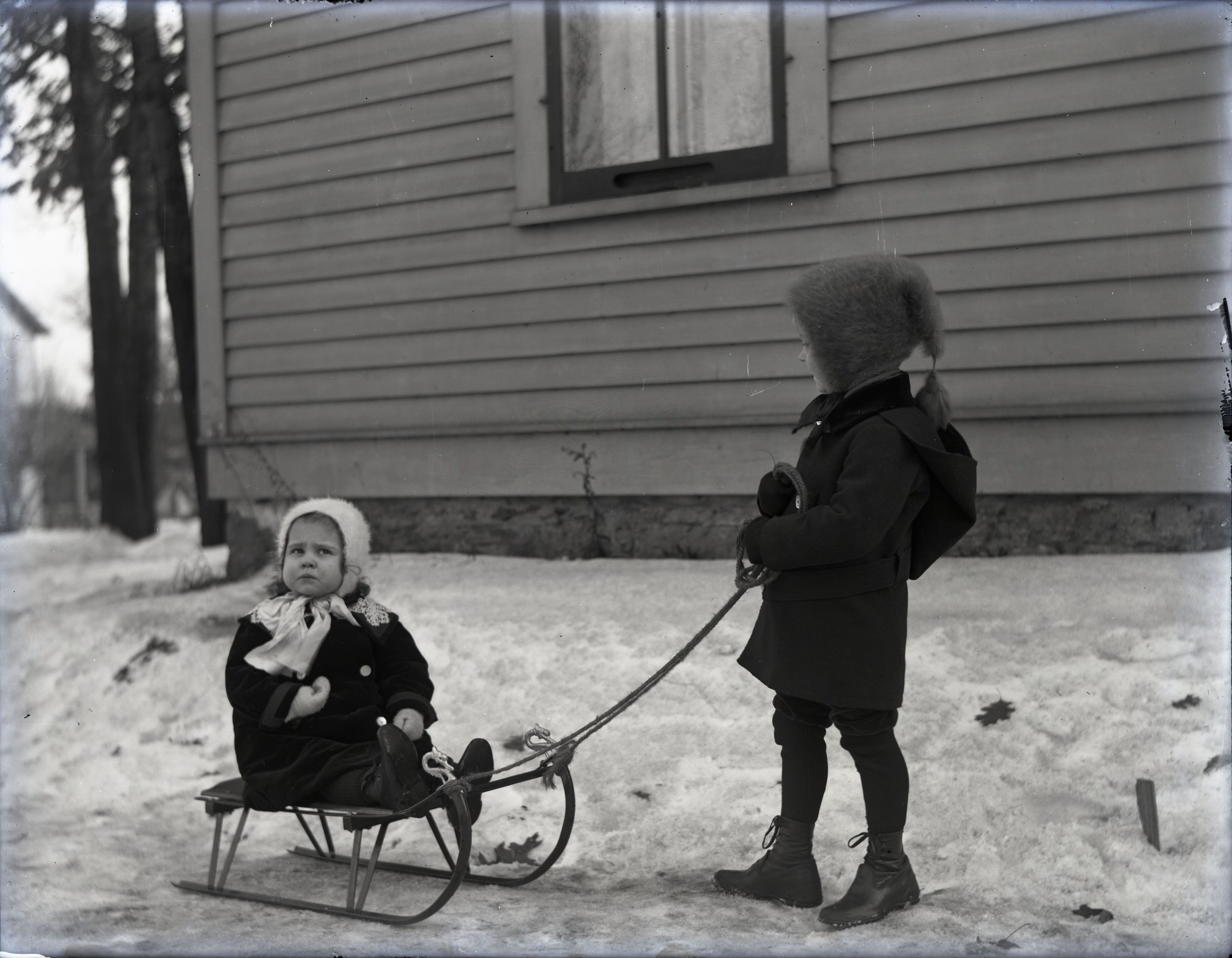
Children with their sled, 1903

A sled, sledge, or sleigh is a vehicle that slides across a surface, usually of ice or snow. It is built with a smooth underside or a separate body supported by runners that reduce friction with the surface. Some designs are pulled by humans, animals, or machines to transport passengers or cargo across relatively level ground. Others are designed to travel downhill for recreation or competition. Terminology varies by region, for example "sled", "sledge", and "sleigh" have different common uses in British, American, and Australian English.

== Etymology ==
The word sled comes from Middle English sledde, which itself has the origins in Middle Dutch word slēde, meaning 'sliding' or 'slider'. The same word shares common ancestry with both sleigh and sledge. The word sleigh, on the other hand, is an anglicized form of the modern Dutch word slee and was introduced to the English language by Dutch immigrants to North America.

== Regional terminology ==
In British English, sledge is the general term, and more common than sled. Toboggan is sometimes used synonymously with sledge but more often to refer to a particular type of sledge without runners. Sleigh refers to a moderate to large-sized, usually open-topped vehicle to carry passengers or goods, and typically drawn by horses, dogs, or reindeer.

In American usage sled remains the general term but often implies a smaller device, often for recreational use. Sledge implies a heavier sled used for moving freight or massive objects. Sleigh refers more specifically than in Britain to a vehicle which is essentially a cold-season alternative to a carriage or wagon and has seating for passengers; what can be called a dog-sleigh in Britain is known only as a dog-sled in North America.

In Australia, where there is limited snow, sleigh and sledge are given equal preference in local parlance.

== Operation ==
Sleds are especially useful in winter but can also be drawn over wet fields, muddy roads, and even hard ground if one helps them along by greasing the blades ("grease the skids") with oil or alternatively wetting them with water. For an explanation of why sleds and other objects glide with various degrees of friction ranging from very little to fairly little friction on ice, icy snow, wet snow, and dry snow, see the relevant sections in the articles on ice and ice skating. The traditional explanation of the pressure of sleds on the snow or ice producing a thin film of water and this enabling sleds to move on ice with little friction is insufficient.

Various types of sleds are pulled by animals such as reindeer, horses, mules, oxen, or dogs.

== History ==
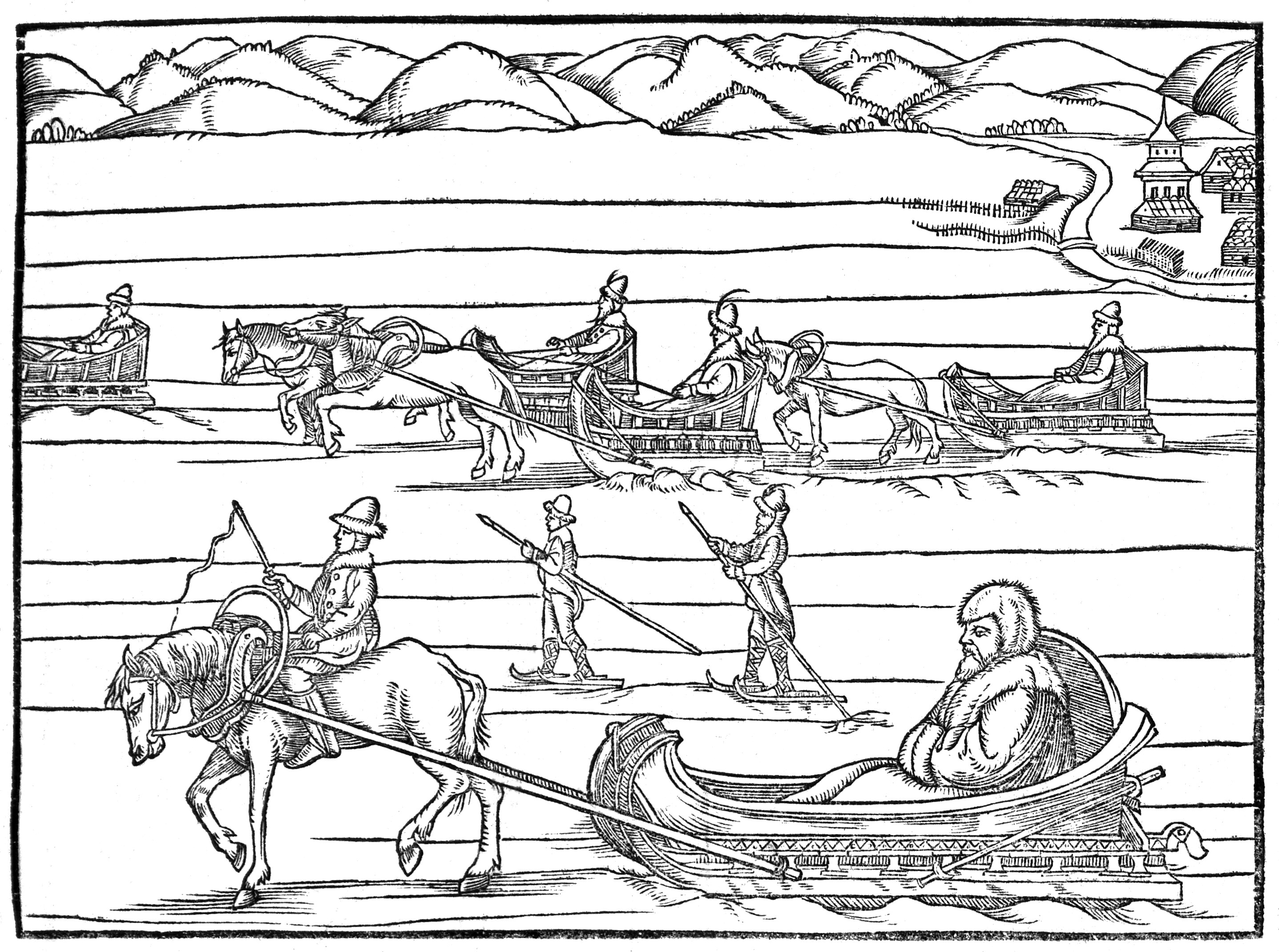
Mid-16th century travel by sleigh

Evidence of the use of sledges or skids for transport has been dated to before 10,000 BCE in North America, by 3,200 BCE in Sumer, and in Ancient Egypt.

Sleds and sledges were found in the Oseberg "Viking" ship excavation. The sledge was also highly prized, because – unlike wheeled vehicles – it was exempt from tolls.

Until the late 19th century, a closed winter sled, or vozok, provided a high-speed means of transport through the snow-covered plains of European Russia and Siberia. It was a means of transport preferred by royals, bishops, and boyars of Muscovy. Several royal vozoks of historical importance have been preserved in the Kremlin Armoury.

Man-hauled sledges were the traditional means of transport on British exploring expeditions to the Arctic and Antarctic regions in the 19th and early 20th centuries, championed for example by Captain Scott. Dog sleds were used by most others, such as Roald Amundsen.

== Types of sleds ==
=== Transport ===
Some transport sleds traditionally used human power or draft animals, but may now be pulled by engines such as snowmobiles or tractors.

- Dog sled, a sled pulled by a team of sled dogs, traditionally used for transport and now also for sled dog racing.
- Kangga, a traditional carabao-drawn sled from the Philippines, used for transport over muddy terrain and rice paddy dikes.
- Pulk (or ahkio), a traditional sled of the Lapland region, used for expeditions, mountain rescue, and cold weather military units to haul equipment, supplies, and passengers.
- Qamutiik, an Inuit sled uniquely adapted for travel on the sea ice.
- Rescue toboggan, developed from the pulk.
- WindSled, kite‑powered polar sleds used in modern scientific expeditions in Antarctica and Greenland.
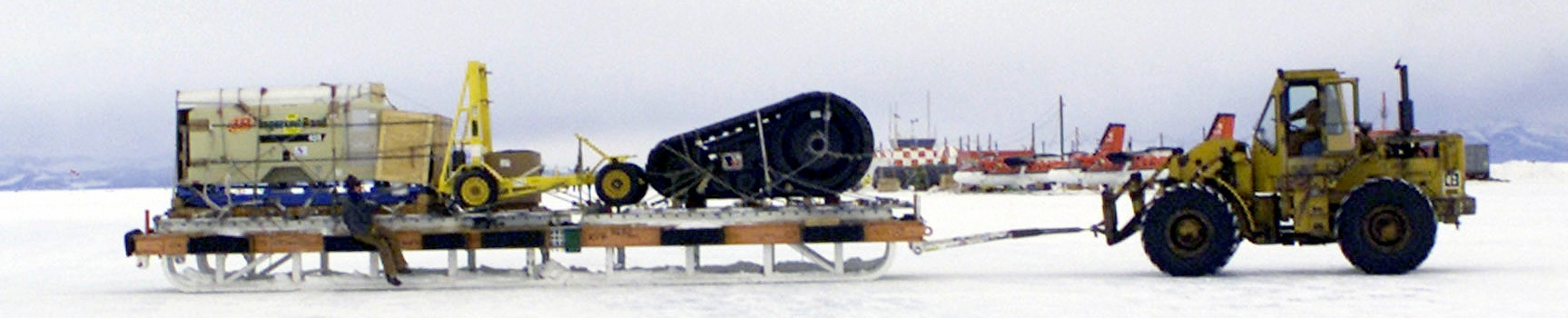
An enormous cargo sledge being maneuvered by a 10K-AT "All Terrain" vehicle at McMurdo Station in Antarctica

=== Recreation ===
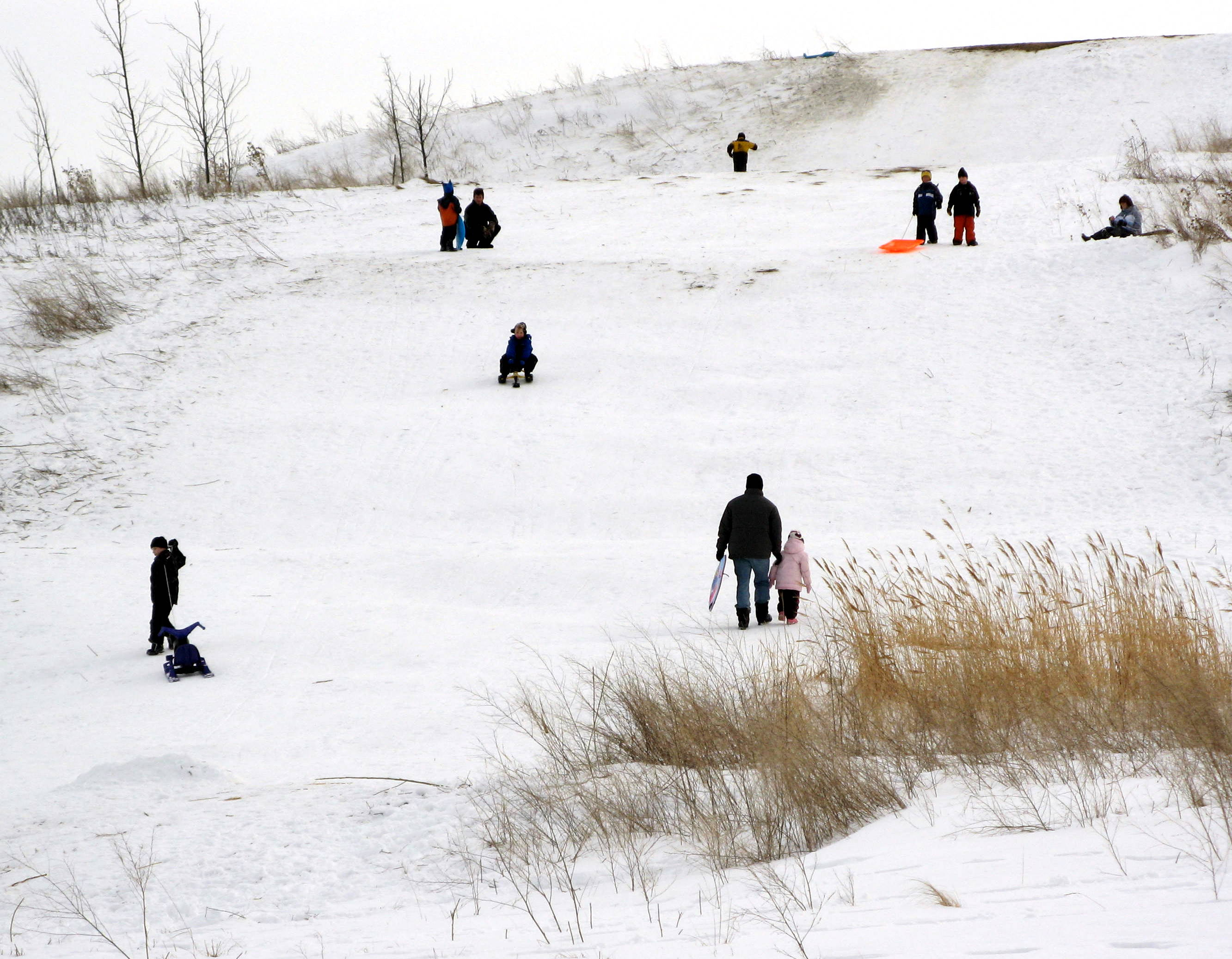
A sledding hill showing several types of recreational sleds

Many types of recreational sleds are designed for sledding—sliding down snowy hills.

- Airboard, a snow bodyboard, i.e. an inflatable single-person sled
- Bum slider, a bum-shaped skid with a simple handle
- Flexible Flyer, a steerable wooden sled with thin metal runners
- Foam slider, a flat piece of durable foam with handles and a smooth underside
- Inflatable tube sled, a plastic membrane filled with air to make a very lightweight round sled
- Kicksled or spark, a human-powered sled
- Saucer sled, a round saucer-shaped sled without runners, usually made out of plastic or metal
- Toboggan, an elongated sled without runners, usually made from wood or plastic, but sometimes made from sheet metal.

=== Competition sleds ===
- Bobsled (British: bobsleigh), an aerodynamic composite-bodied vehicle on lightweight runners
- Luge and skeleton, tiny sleds with runners for one or two competitors

== See also ==
- Ski — two narrow runners attached to a person's boots, designed to glide over snow
- Ski seat — Traditional Slovenian sled-like vehicle
- Snowboard — a single wide runner where a person places both feet on a single board
- Snowmobile — a motorized vehicle designed for winter travel and recreation over snow
- Carros de cesto do Monte — A Madeiran basket sled for people and goods to get down steep paved roads
