= Sliding =

Sliding may refer to:

- Slide (baseball), an attempt by a baseball runner to avoid getting tagged out
- Sliding (motion)

== See also ==
- Slide (disambiguation)
- Slider (disambiguation)
