= Airboard =

Airboard may refer to:

- A self-balancing hoverboard made by Airwheel.
- A manufacturer of stand-up paddleboards.
- An inflatable snow bodyboard: see airboard (sled).
