= Nikolai Kobelkoff =

Russian-born fairground performer and Prater amusement entrepreneur

- Николай Васильевич Кобельков
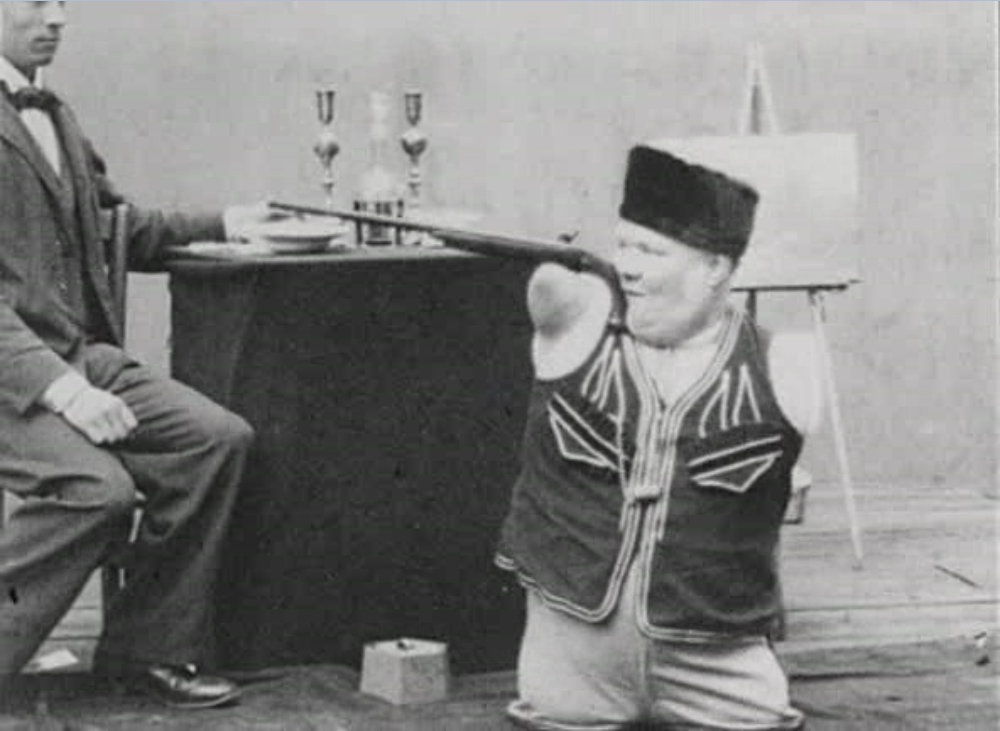
- Frame from the 1900 film Kobelkoff
- Born: July 22, 1851; Troitsk area, Orenburg Governorate, Russian Empire (now in Chelyabinsk Oblast, Russia)
- Died: January 19, 1933 (aged 81); Vienna, Austria
- Occupations: Circus and fairground performer; amusement entrepreneur
- Known for: Stage performances despite congenital limb malformations; Prater attractions in Vienna
- Spouse: Anna Wilfert (m. 1876)

Nikolai Vasilyevich Kobelkoff (Russian: Николай Васильевич Кобельков; 22 July 1851 – 19 January 1933) was a Russian-born fairground and circus performer and later an amusement entrepreneur associated with the Prater in Vienna. Born with severe congenital limb malformations, he became known in late-19th-century Europe for public performances demonstrating dexterity and strength, and later operated amusement attractions in Vienna.

== Early life ==
Kobelkoff was born in the Troitsk area of the Orenburg Governorate in the Russian Empire. Contemporary accounts describe him as having been born without functional arms and legs, retaining only short limb stumps. He learned to write and draw by stabilizing tools against his body and is reported to have performed a range of precise manual tasks despite his disability.

== Career ==
From the early 1870s, Kobelkoff appeared as an attraction and performer at fairs, curiosity shows, and theatres across the Russian Empire and Europe, and later toured more widely. Reports and later summaries describe acts such as writing, threading needles, handling firearms, and lifting weights as part of his stage performances. In 1900, he appeared in a short silent film titled Kobelkoff, which records part of his stage routine.

By the early 20th century, Kobelkoff was established in Vienna and invested in amusement businesses in the Prater. He is associated with operating Prater attractions and, in the 1910s, with the Prater Toboggan ride.

== Personal life ==
In 1876, Kobelkoff married Anna Wilfert in Budapest. Sources describe the couple as having several children, who were not affected by his disability.

== Death and legacy ==
Kobelkoff died in Vienna in January 1933. Materials connected with his performances are reported to be preserved in Viennese museum collections related to entertainment and circus history. He is buried in Vienna; his grave is listed as an honorary dedication at the Evangelical Cemetery in Simmering.

== See also ==
- Disability in the arts
