= Bum slider =

Toy sled for winter recreation

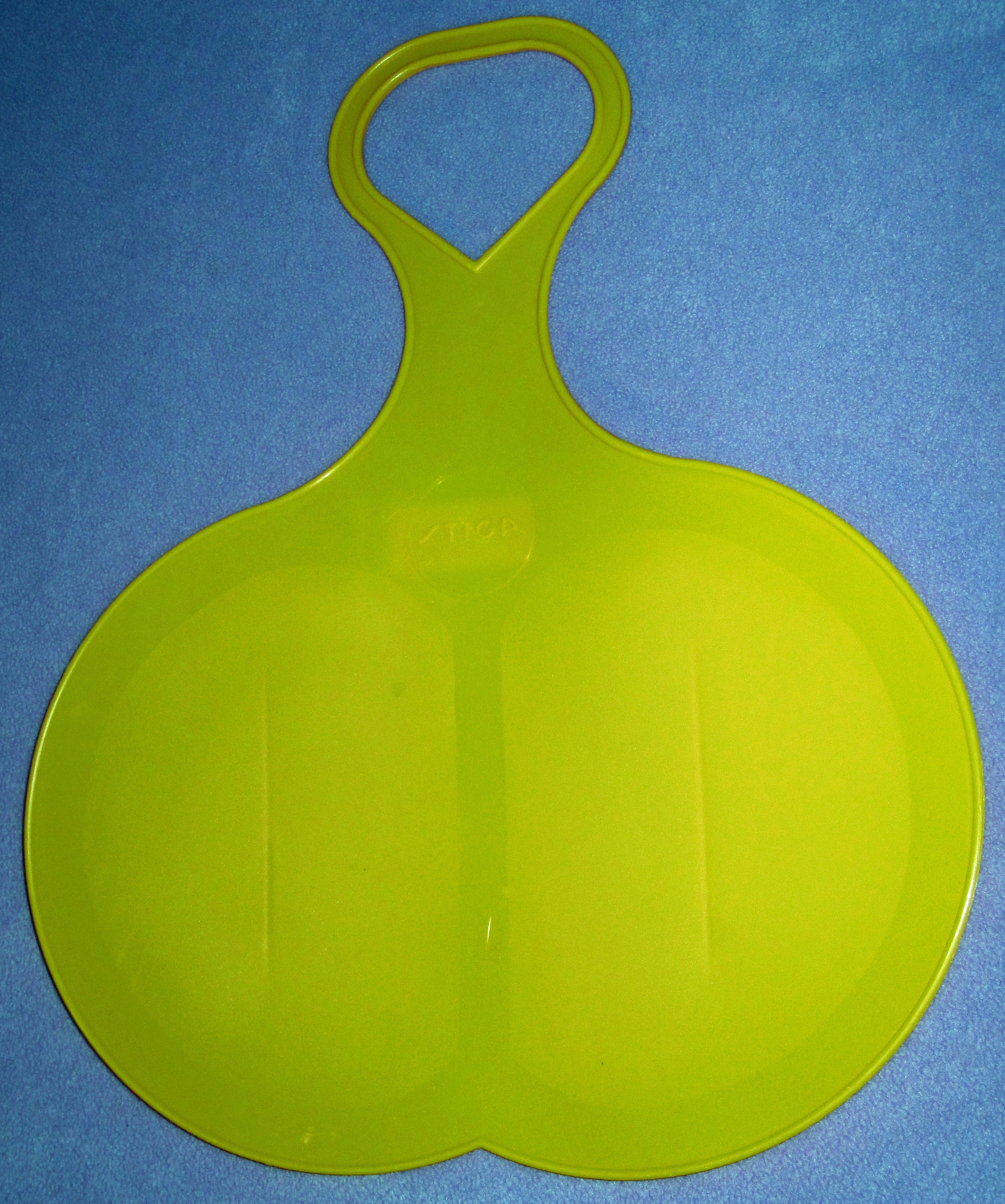
Bum slider

A bum slider (cf. Swedish: stjärtlapp, lit. 'bum patch') is a simple sled-like toy used in snowy winter recreation, consisting of a bum-shaped flat piece of plastic, intended as the skid, and a forward-facing handle for the rider to hold onto. To ride it, the rider sits on the skid with their legs up in the air and pulls the handle up between them while sledding downhill. Depending on the part of the world, it may be viewed as a derivative of a toboggan, pulk, or other family of sleds for winter recreation.

In Swedish preschools, the bum slider is a common piece of equipment for outdoor gross motor play during winter. Since 2008, the Nordic Championships in extreme bum sliding, known as "X-treme Asslapp" (partial calque of Swedish: stjärtlapp), have been held in Riksgränsen, a ski resort in Sweden.

== See also ==
- Foam slider
- Saucer sled

== Sources ==
- Eisenhauer, Benjamin Maximilian (2021). The Great Dictionary English - Swedish. Benjamin Maximilian Eisenhauer. ISBN 978-3-98510-851-0.
- Nyrén Carlén, Veronica; Pettersson, Viktoria (2022). Förskolans utemiljö - fysisk aktivitet och rörelseglädje för ett hälsosamt liv [Preschool outdoor environment physical activity and joy of movement for a healthy life] (PDF) (Bachelor's thesis) (in Swedish). Borås: University of Borås.
