= Ski seat =

Traditional Slovenian sled-like vehicle

Ski seat (Pležuh) derives from the fringes of Kobansko in the Drava valley and is a traditional Slovenian sledding device, used in winter for both transport and recreation. It is known by several regional names: plejžuh, pok (Pohorje), and drdlec (Slovenske Gorice). Tourist sources often describe the device as being "over 200 years old", but an ethnographic study published in Etnolog notes that this claim is undocumented and relies primarily on oral tradition passed down for at least four generations.

== History ==
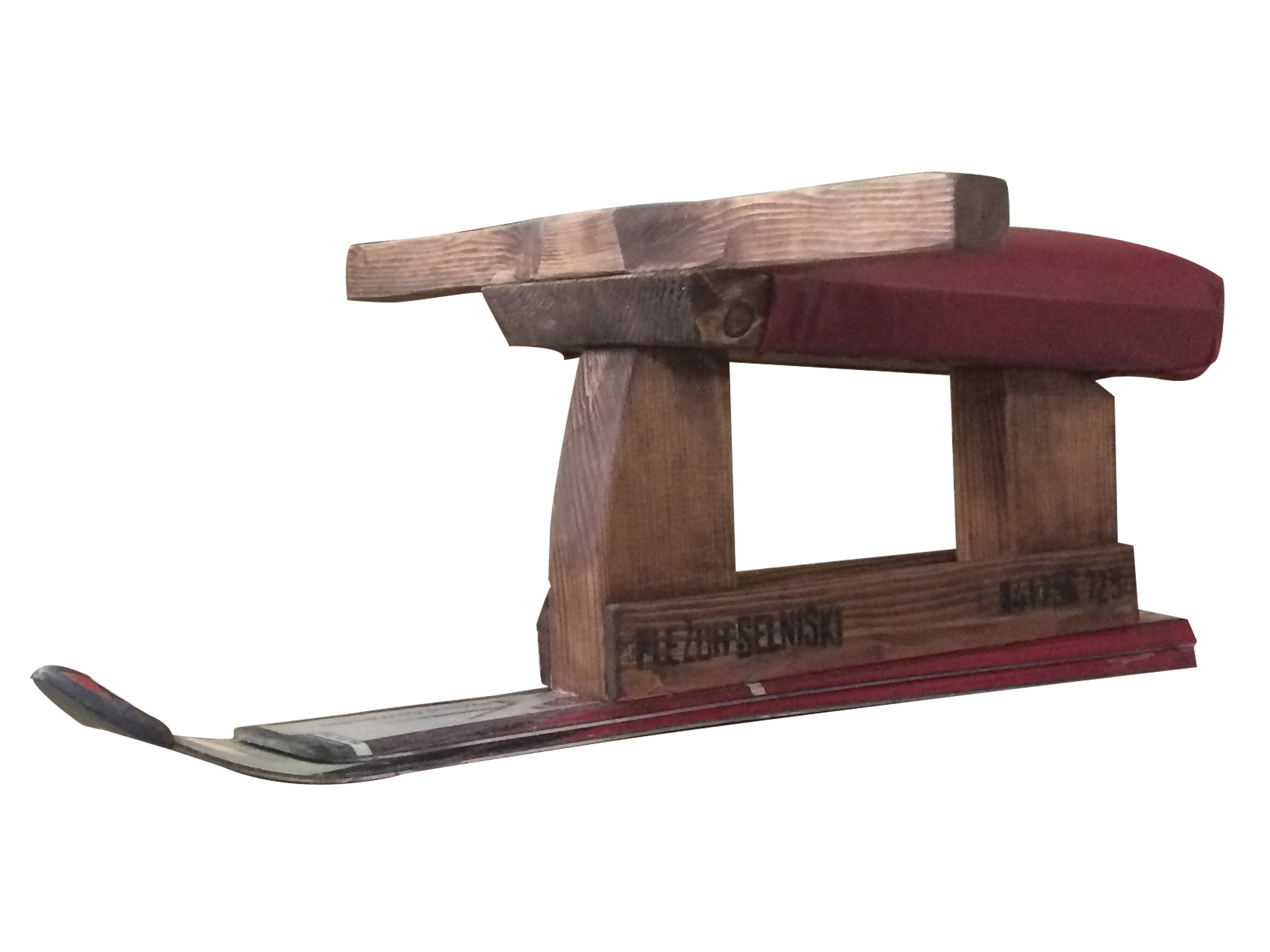
Sky seat (Pležuh)

Early ski seats were made from curved boards from unused barrels, fitted with two upright posts joined by a board that served as the seat. As riders pushed for higher speeds, the design changed: modern versions replaced the barrel wood with old skis, giving the pležuh a more streamlined shape. This modern form is credited to craftsman Andrej Volmajer of Selnica ob Dravi, who built it in the early 1960s.

The tradition was revived in the winter following 1993, when a group of enthusiasts from Selnica ob Dravi organised the first modern "Spust s pležuhi" (Pležuh descent) on a local slope. The event became an annual competition later organised by the Country Club Selnica ob Dravi, which works to preserving this piece of folk heritage. After several years, lack of snow at the original site the organisers moved the race to the Snežni Stadion under Mariborsko Pohorje, where it continued to attract participants and spectators. In 2011, Maribor hosted a "4 Cross" championship with 124 competitors.
