= Pulk =

Type of sled

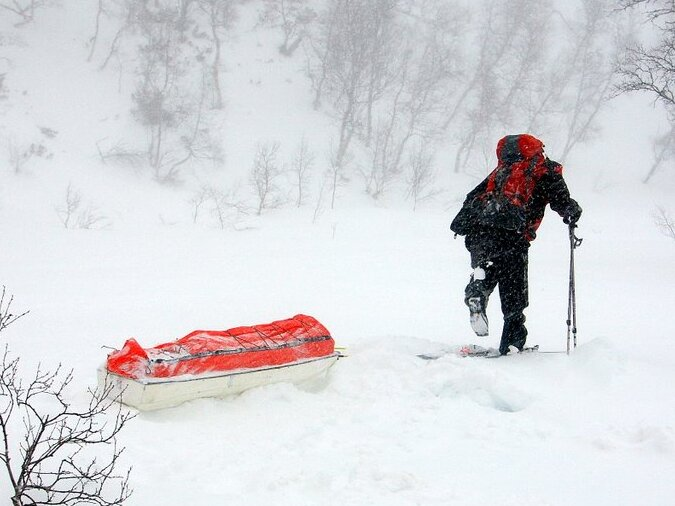
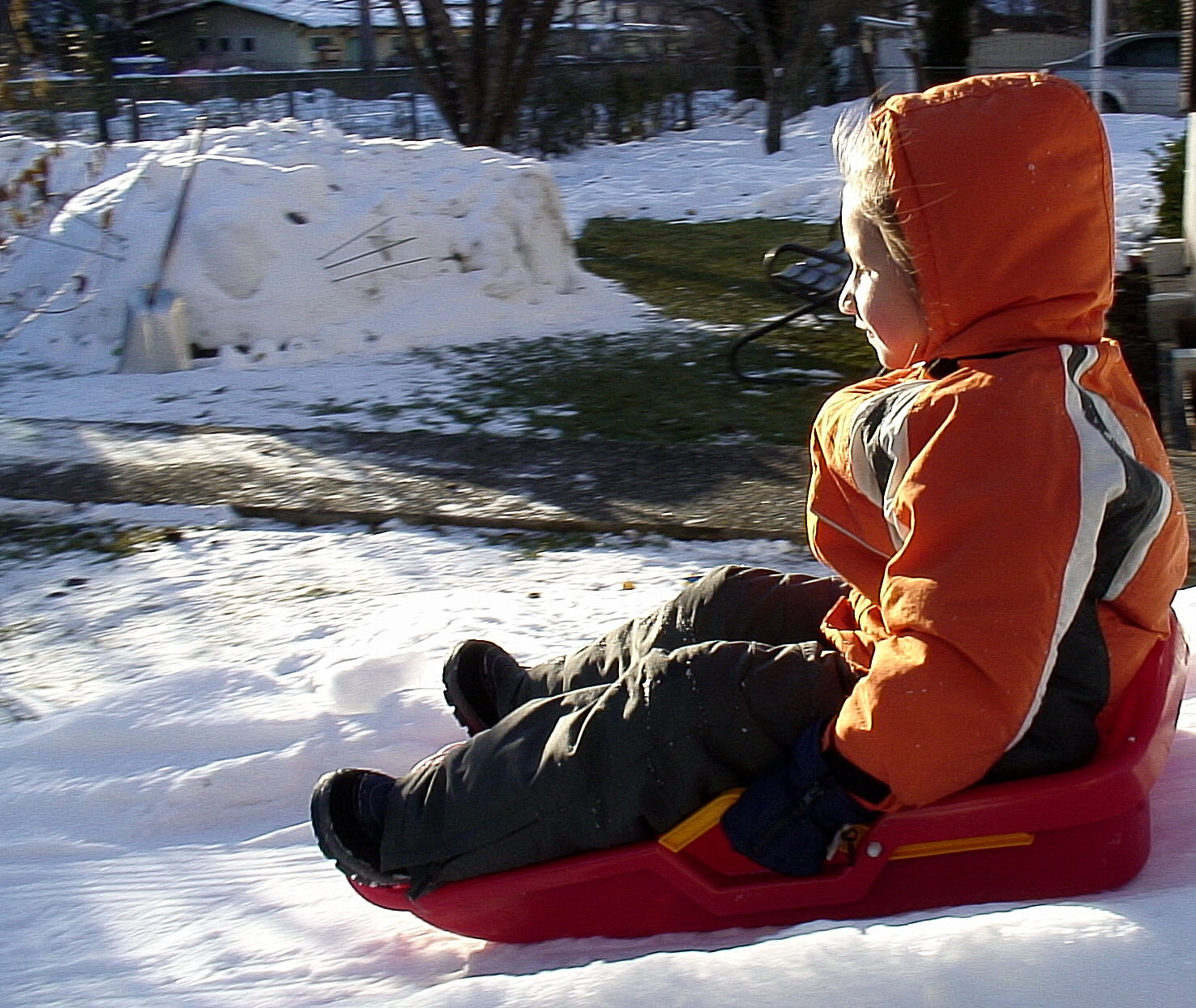
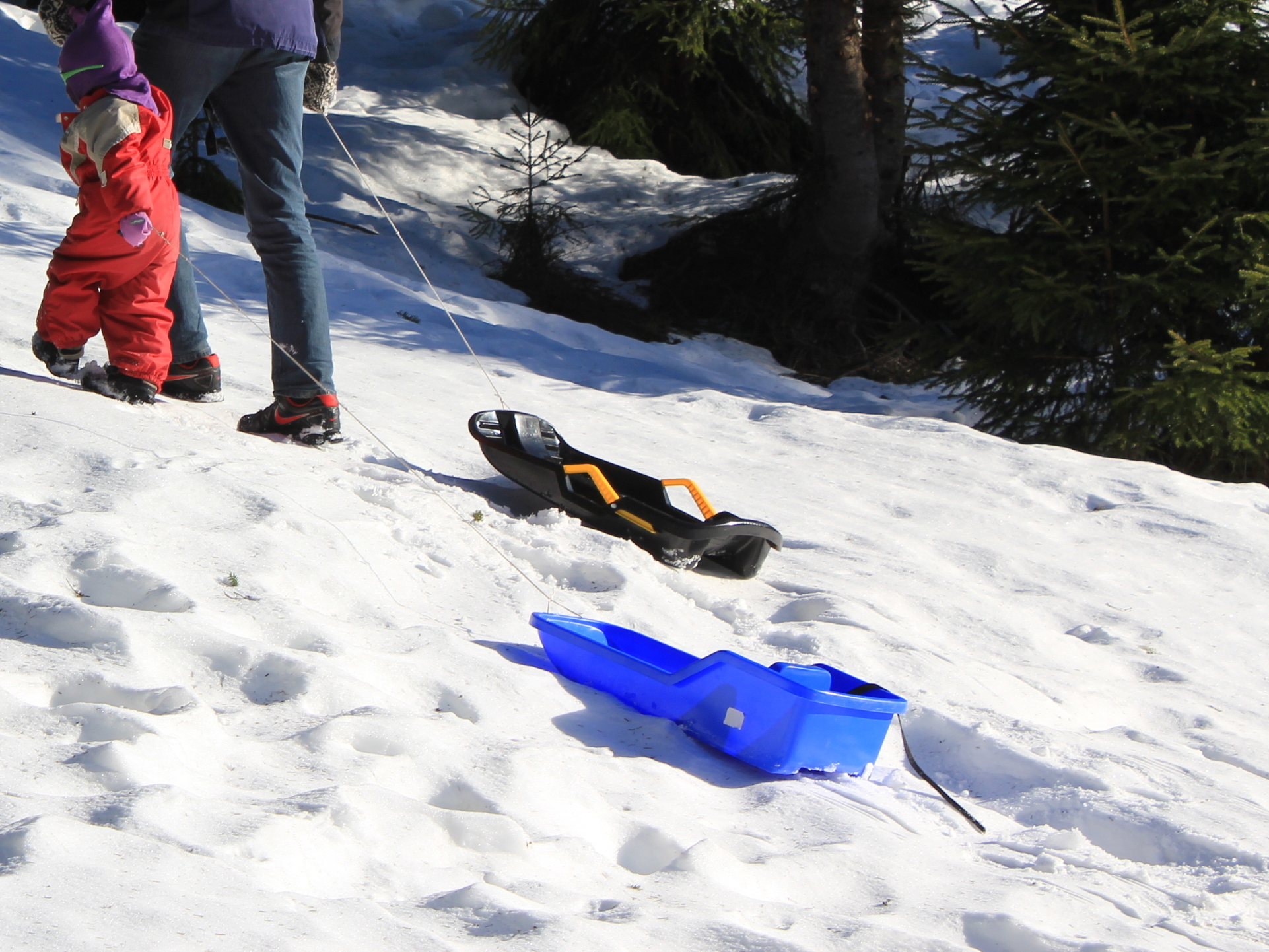
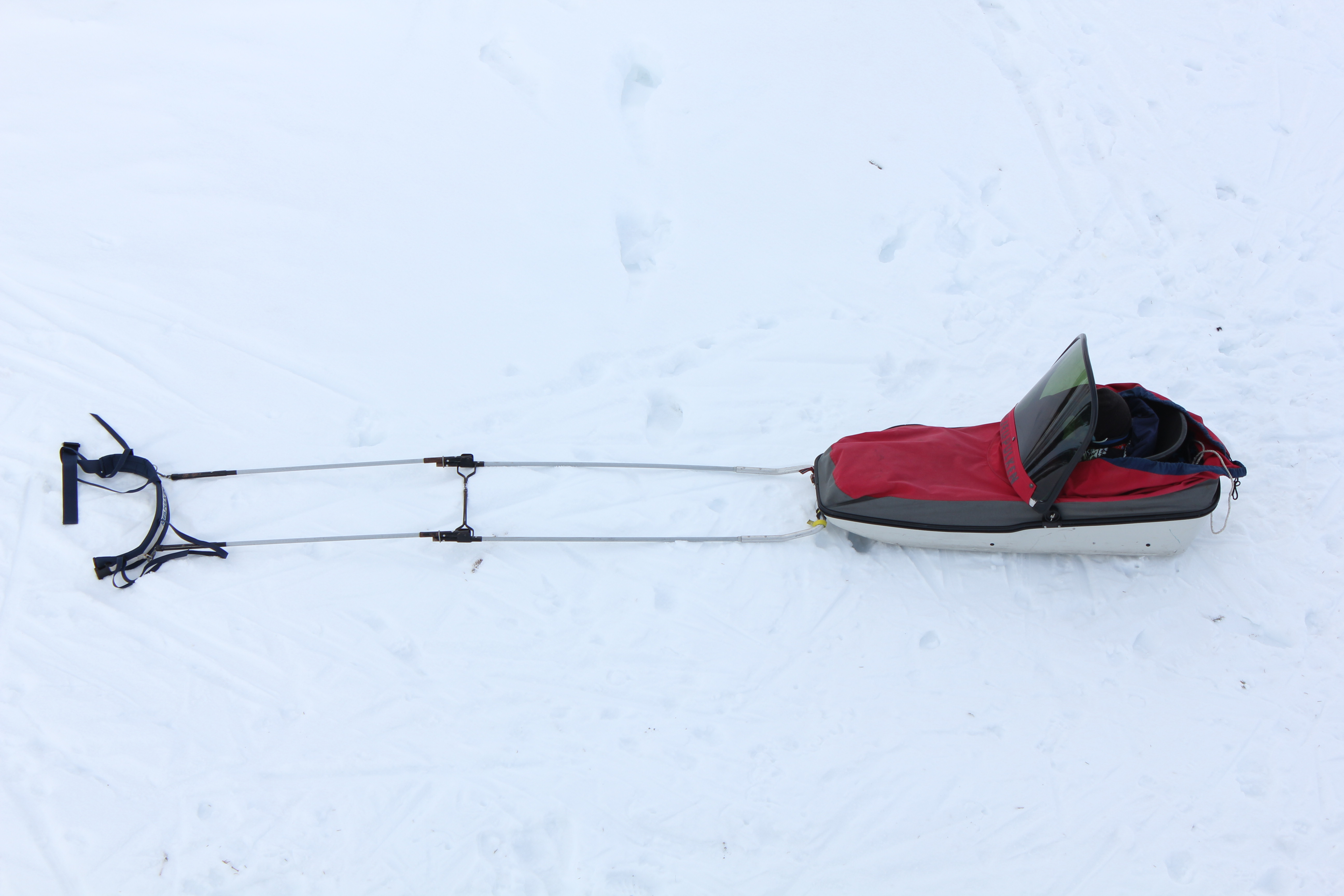
- Upper left: Pulk pulled by a skier
- Upper right: Kid on a toy pulk
- Lower left: Adult and child pulling toy pulks uphill
- Lower right: Small skiing pulk with harness

A pulk (Norwegian: pulk, Swedish: pulka, Finnish: pulkka; Northern Sami: bulki; from Sami languages: pul'hkē) is originally a Nordic term for a low-slung boat-like sled, sometimes without runners, capable of being pulled by hand on foot or skis, or by light draft animals such as dogs or reindeer. A toboggan could be called a pulk. They are classically made out of wood and other natural materials but are nowadays made of plastic, which makes them inexpensive.

Pulks are originally meant to carry supplies such as a tent or food, or transport a child or other person. In Norway, Finland and Sweden, pulks are often used by parents to pull small children on skiing trips. In Finland and Sweden, pulks exist as a winter toy, mainly for children, for going downhill.

== Akja ==
A larger pulk, designed for transporting larger amounts of goods, is called a akja (Finnish: ahkio [ɑhkio]; Swedish: ackja; German: Akja, Akia). The term stems from older Sami akio, akje and Finnish: ahkio, akkio, akkia, which in turn is a borrowing from Proto-Norse, cognate with Swedish: äcka, Icelandic: ekja, "driving, fording", to the root ak (Swedish: åk), "drive, ford, ride", ultimately related to "act".

Listed old Sami synonyms include: geres, kerres, låkkek and pulka.

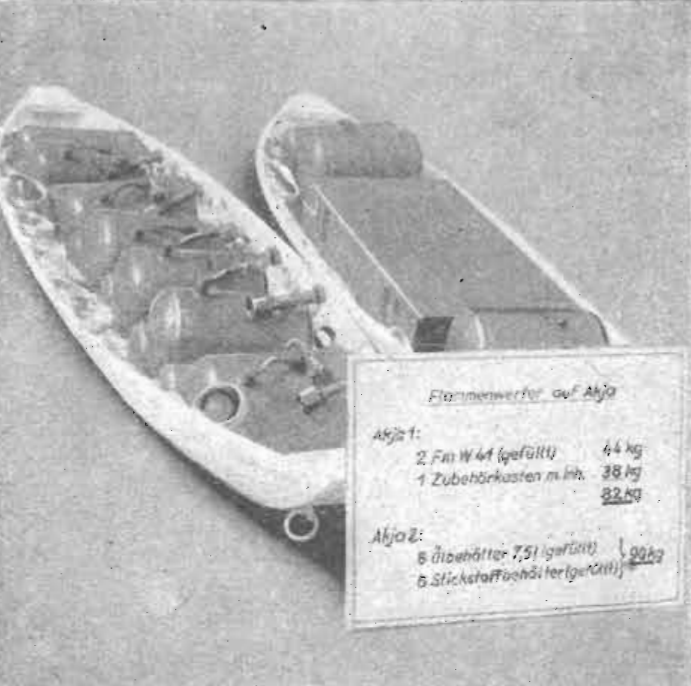
German "boat akja" (Boots-Akja) during World War II

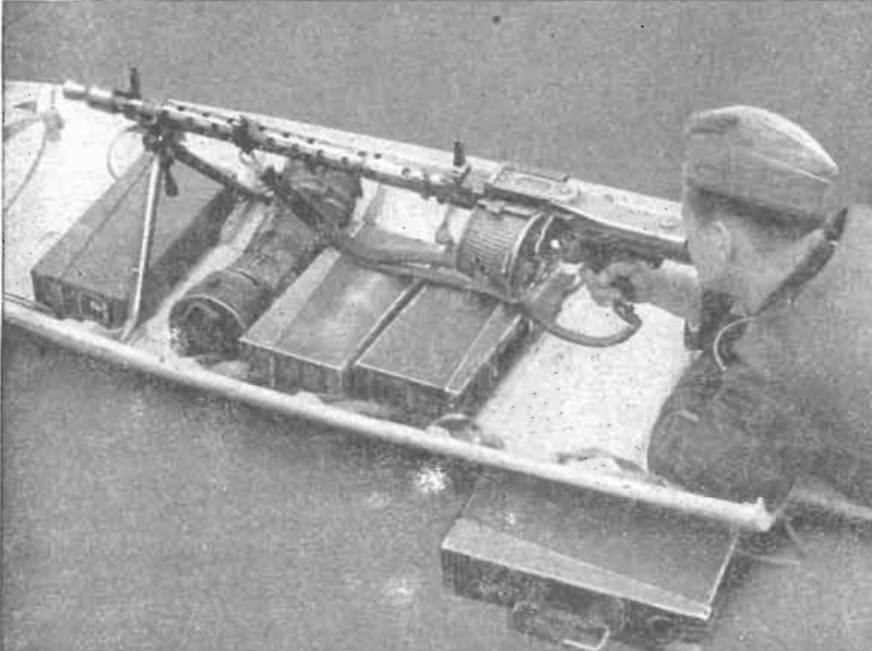
German "weapon akja" (Waffen-Akja) during World War II

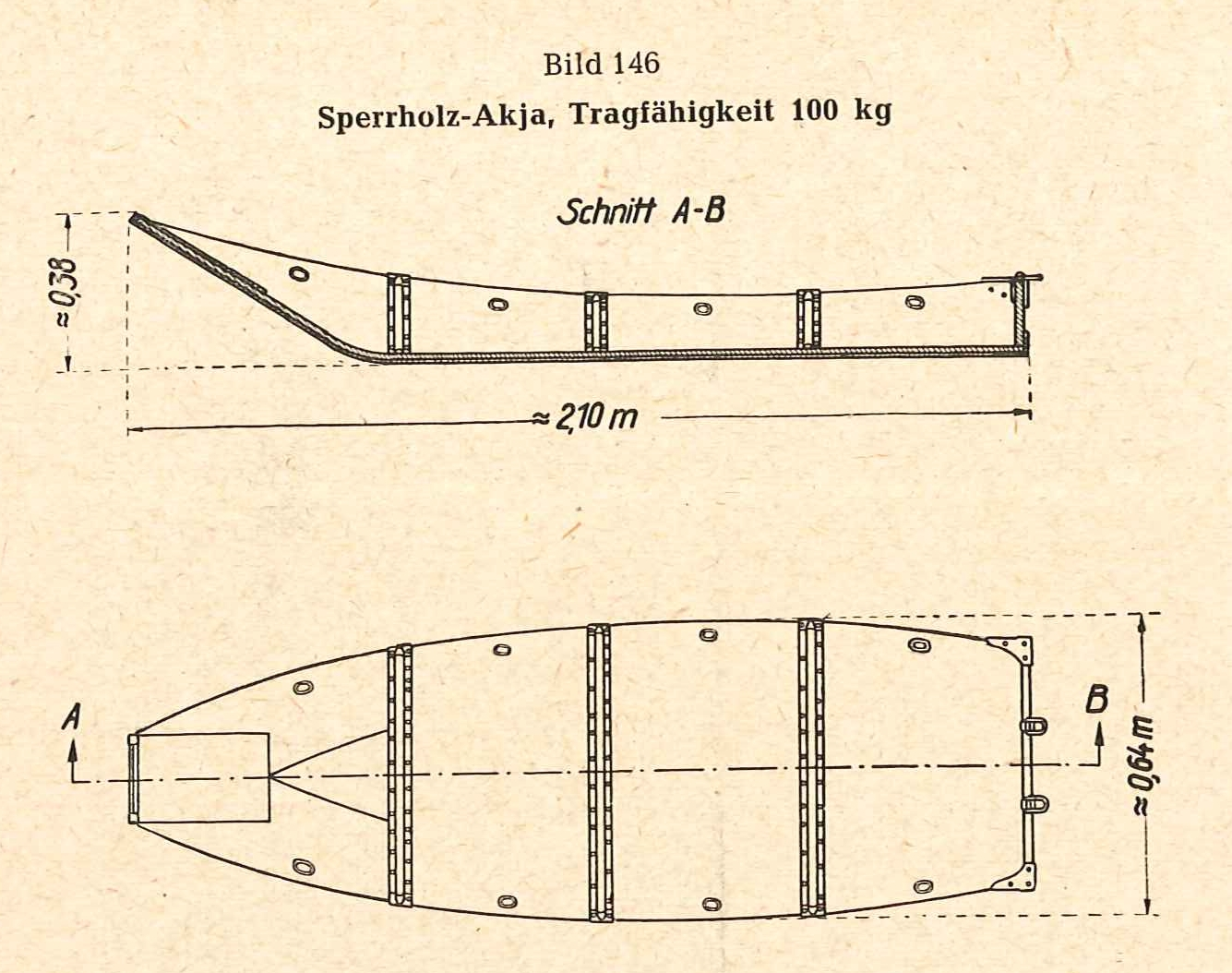
German "plywood akja" (Sperrholz-Akja) blueprint

== Slider ==
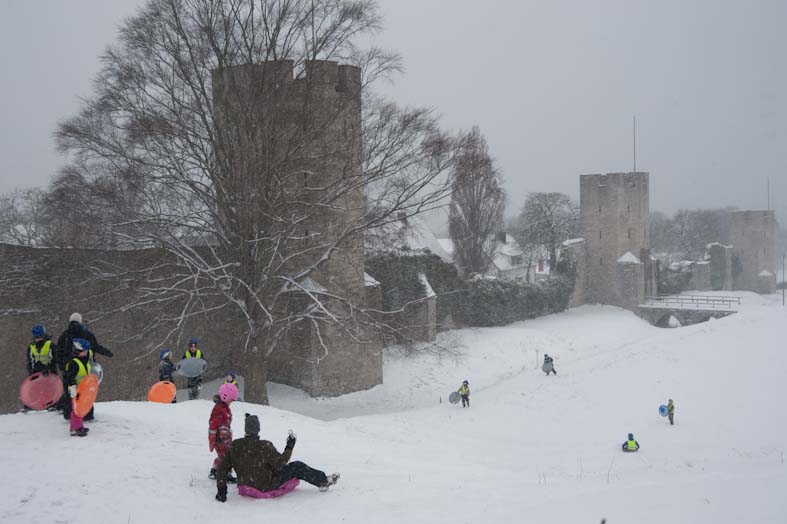
Saucers and pulks being ridden in Visby, Sweden

In the Nordic countries, toy pulks made of plastic are very common for winter recreation. They typically hold 1–2 children and have footrests on the front.

There are various derivatives of the plastic toy pulk. In English, such are typically referred to as "sliders" in various compunds, etc. Some classic examples includes:

- Bum slider
- Foam slider
- Saucer sled

== Gallery ==
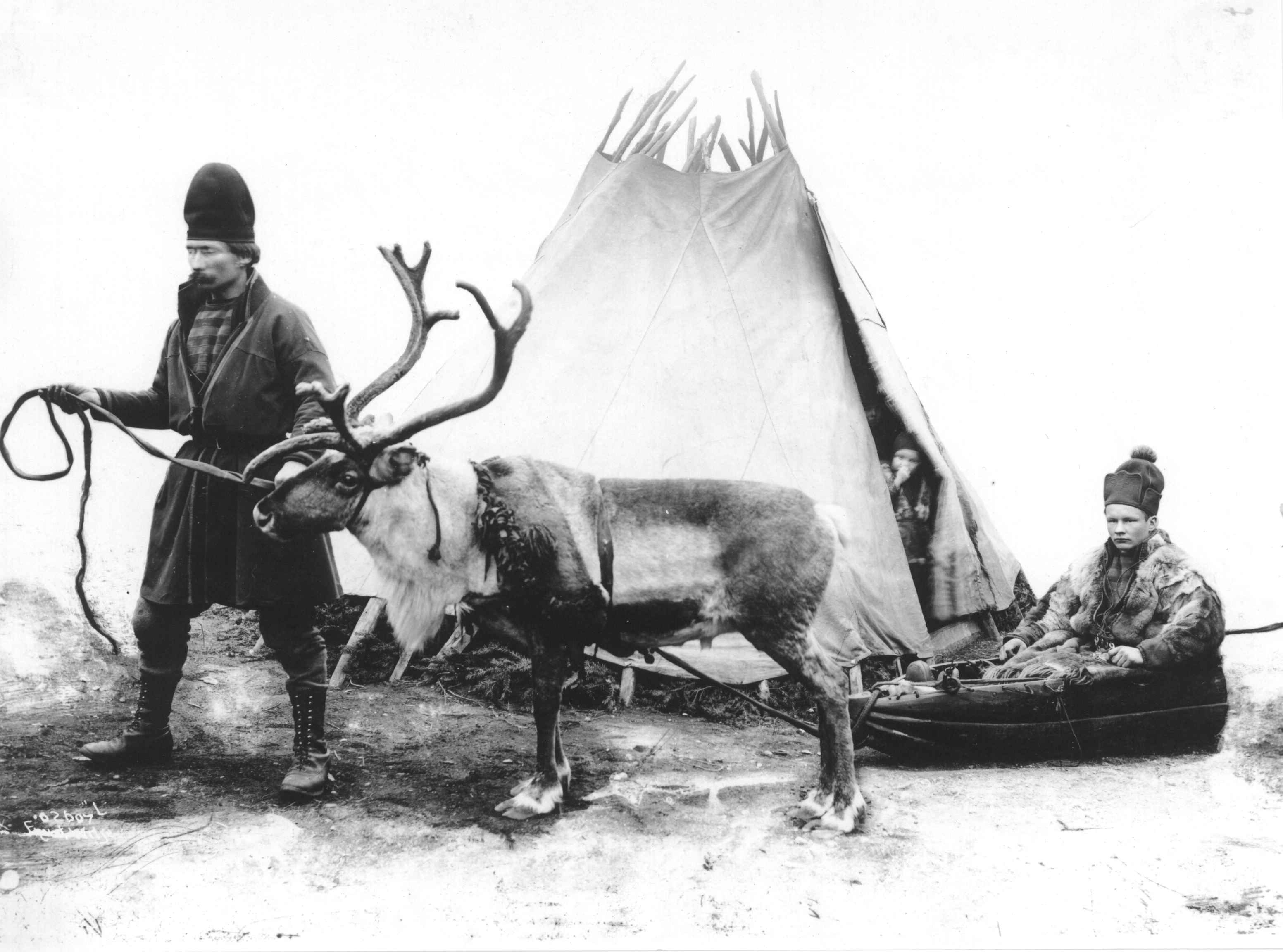
Reindeer pulled pulk

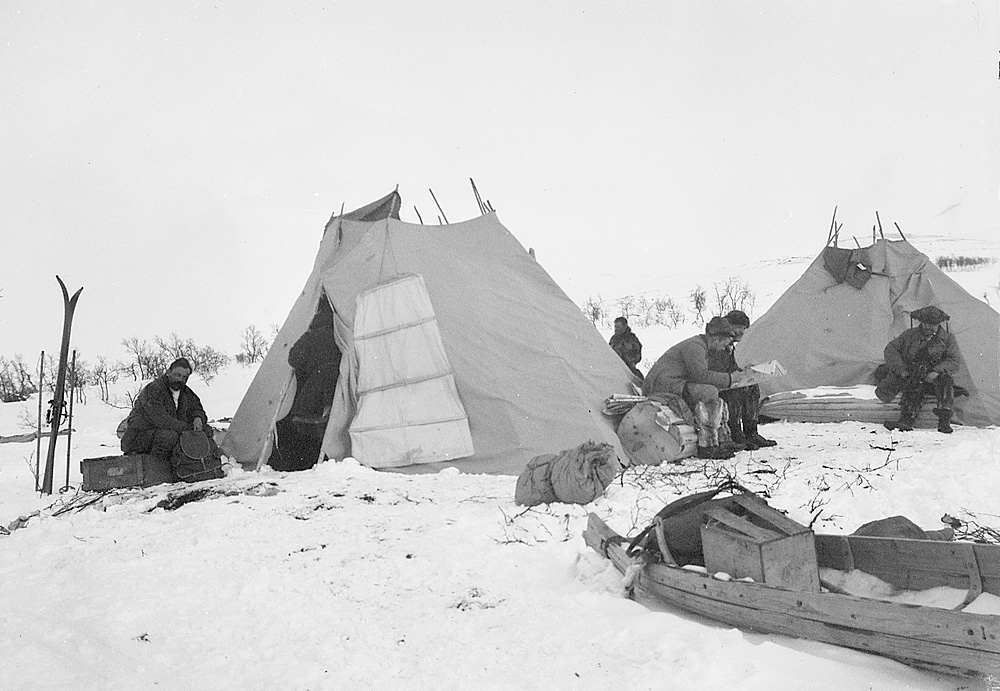
Sami with wooden pulk

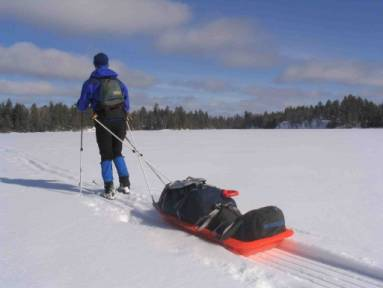
Pulk pulled by a skier

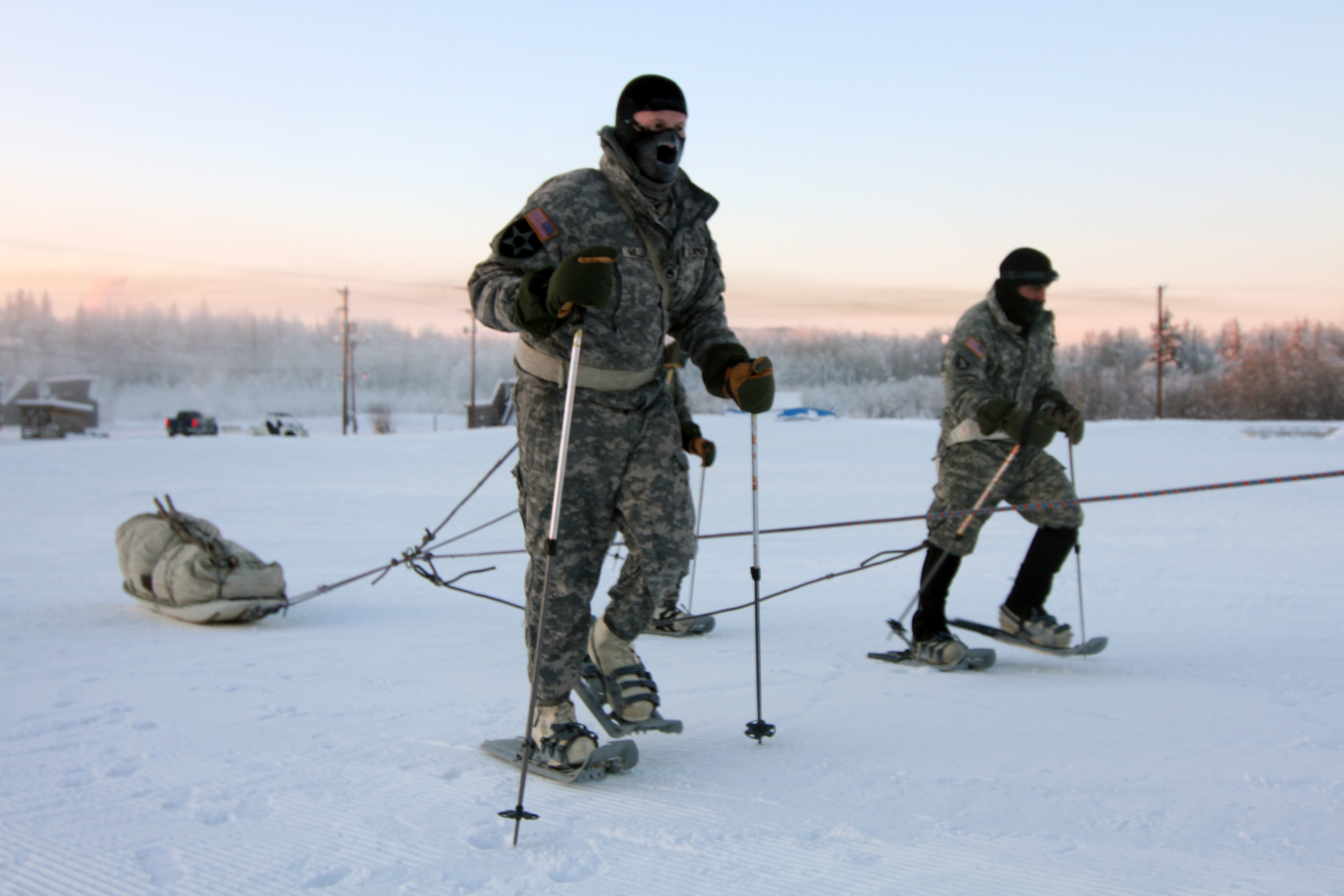
US Army pulks

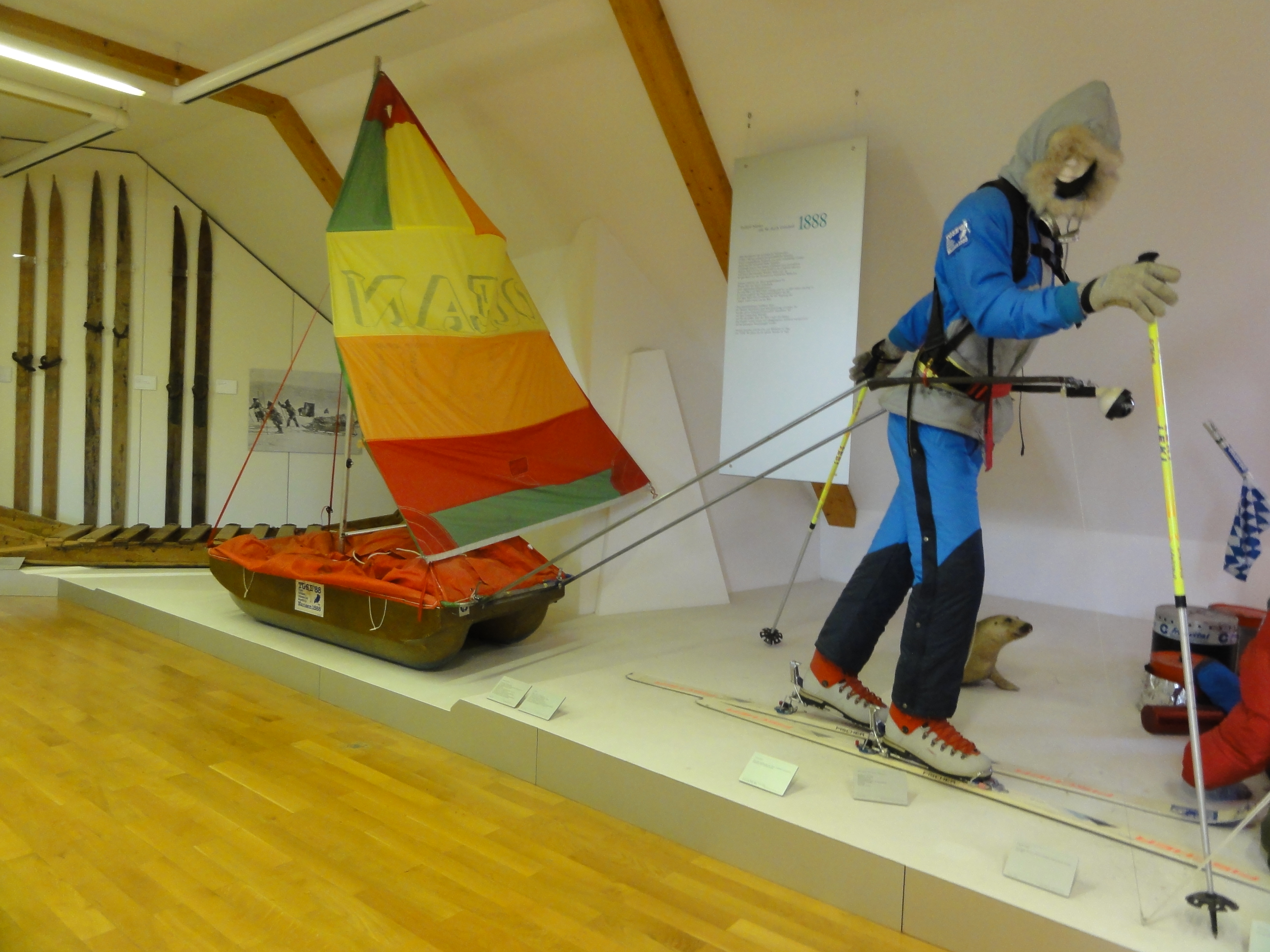
Pulk with sail

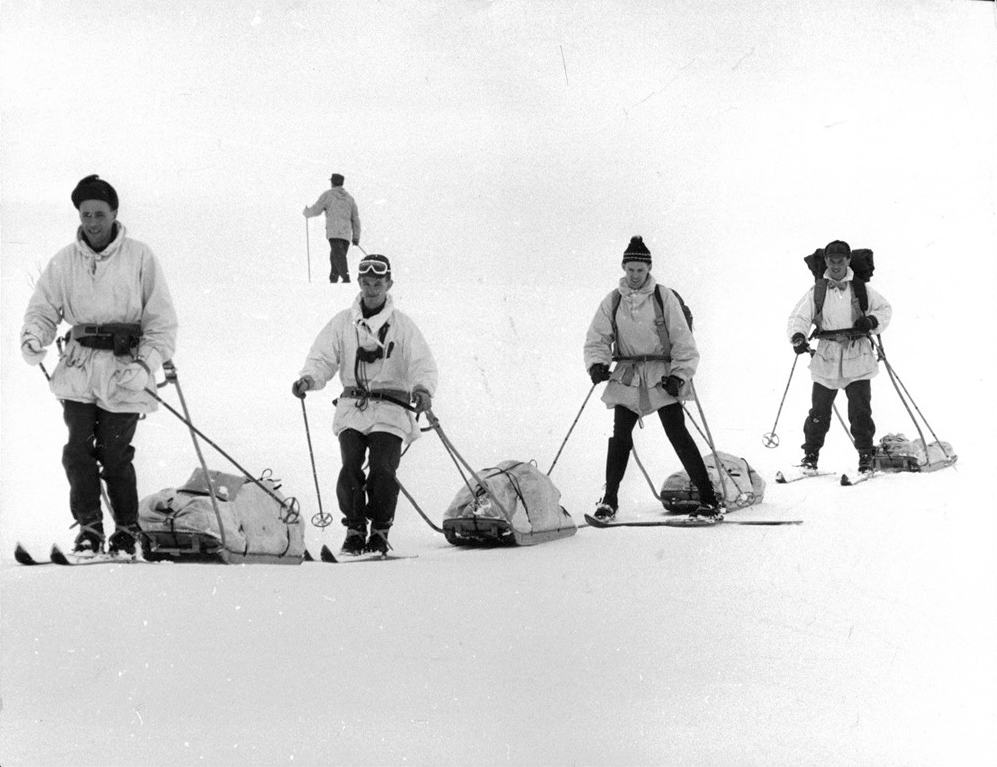
Swedish Army pulks

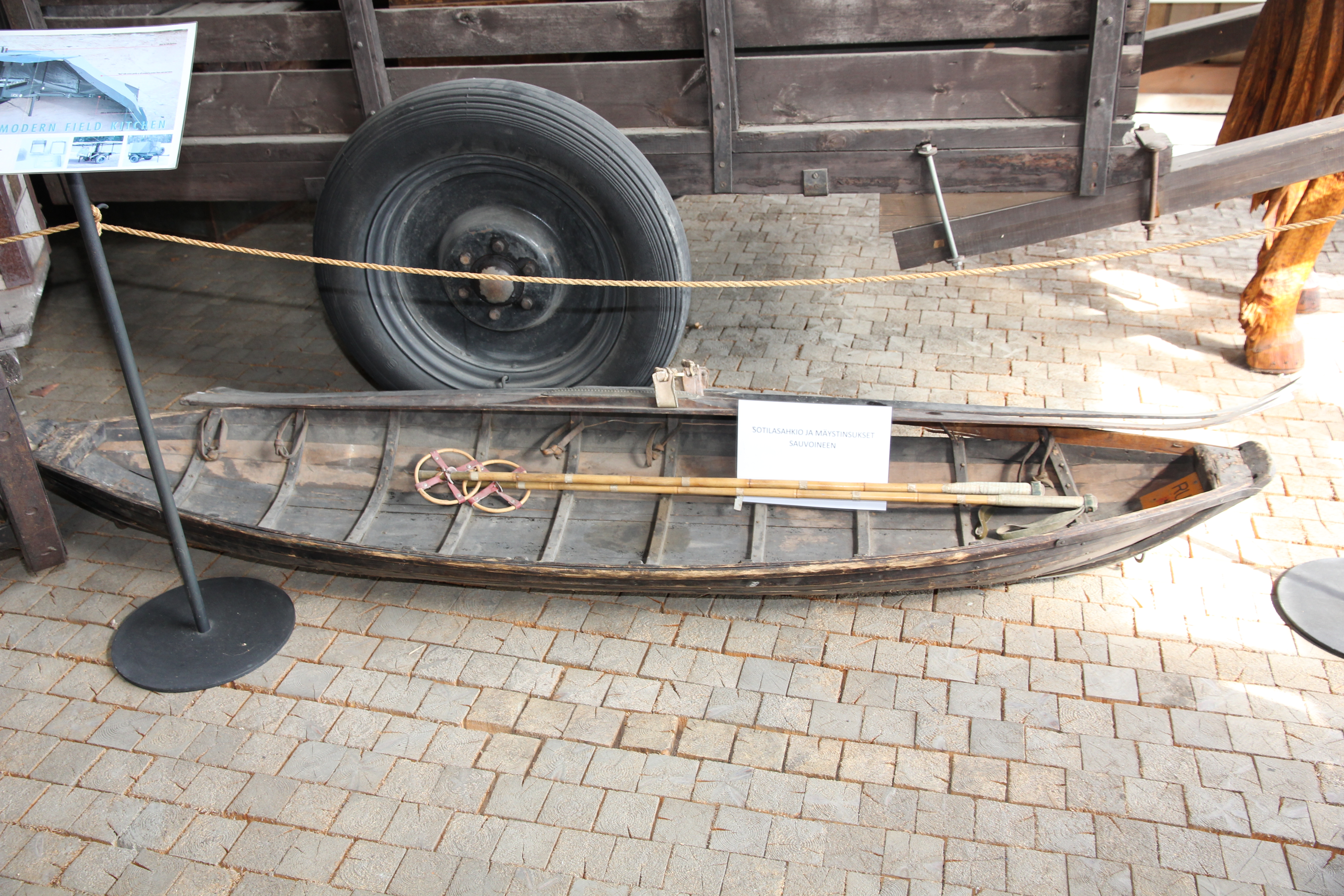
Wooden pulk in museum

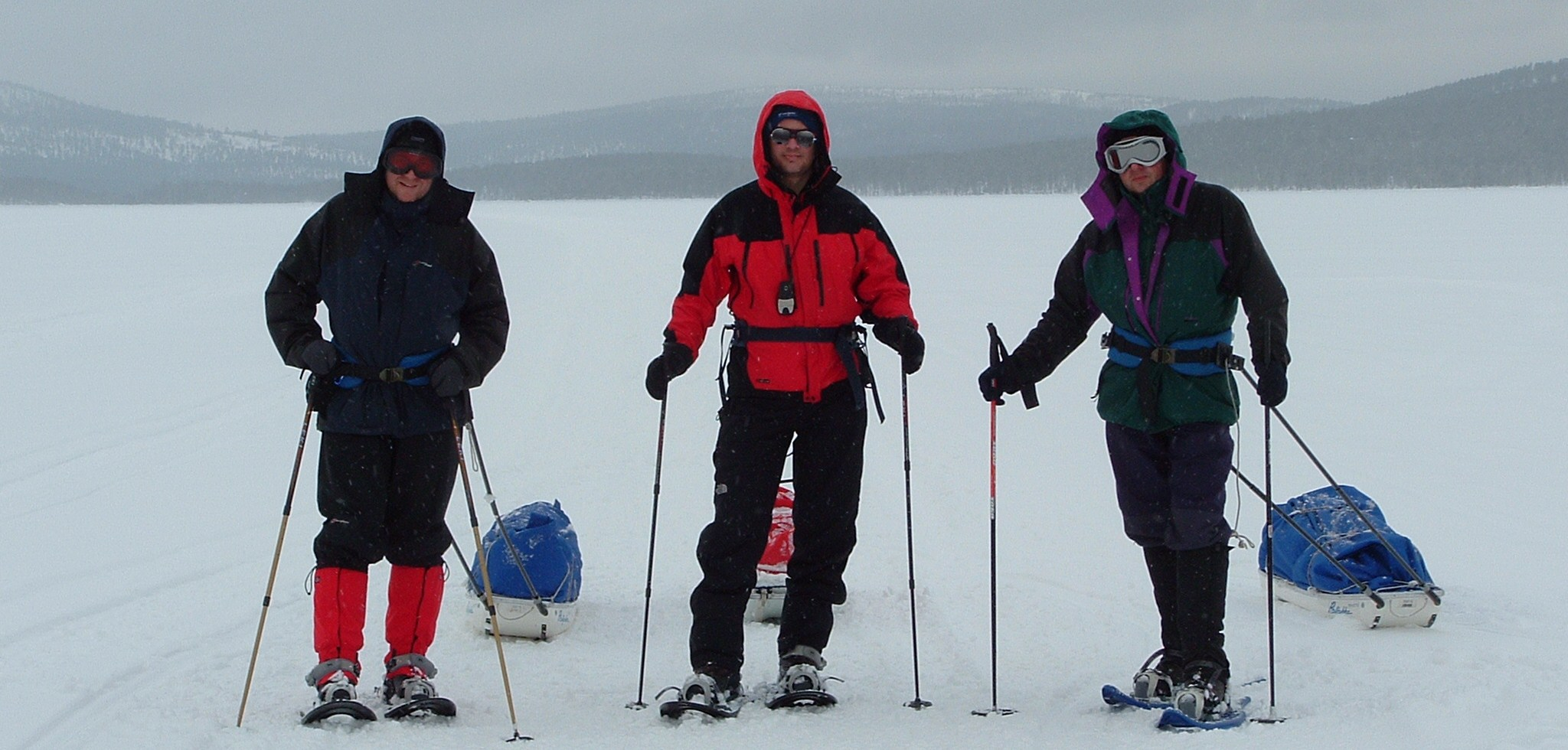
Snowshoers with pulled pulks

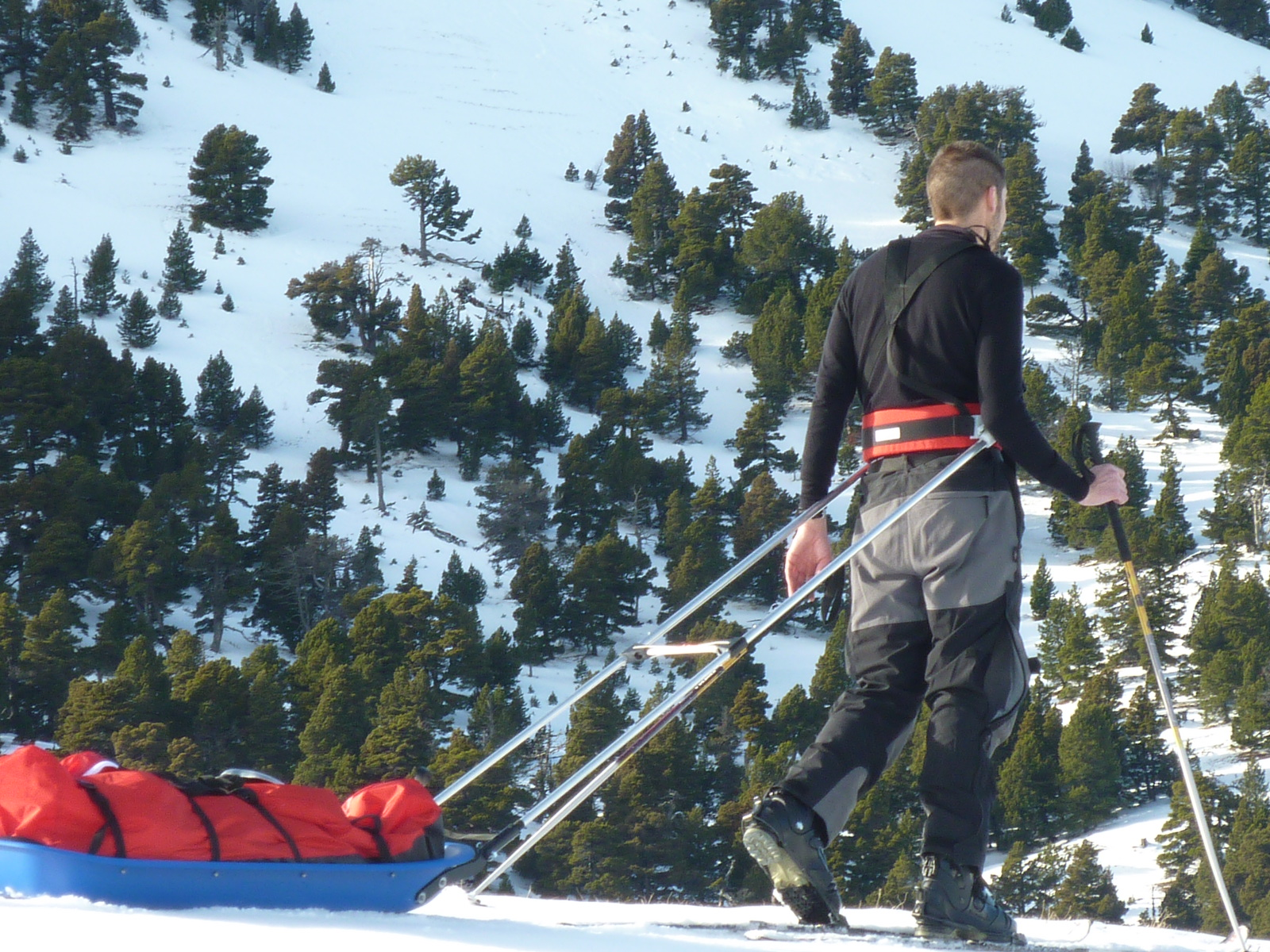
Skier with pulk

== See also ==
- Mushing
- Skijoring
- Toboggan
