= Airboard (sled) =

Inflatable sled

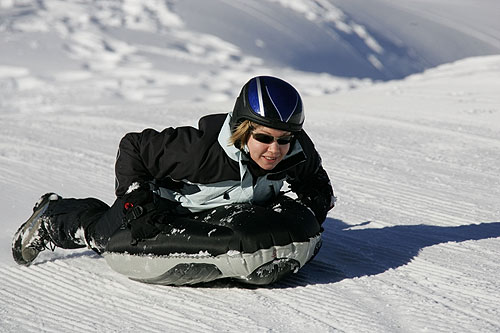
Airboard

An airboard is an inflatable bodyboard for the snow. It is a single-person sled.
