= Slide Lake =

Slide Lake may mean:

== Lakes ==
- Slide Lake (Idaho), a glacial lake in Elmore County, Idaho
- Slide Lake (Montana), a lake in Glacier National Park, Montana
- Lower Slide Lake, a lake in Teton County, Wyoming
- Rock Slide Lake, a glacial lake in Boise County, Idaho

== Other ==
- Slide Lake-Otatso Creek Patrol Cabin and Woodshed, a group of rustic buildings in Glacier National Park, Montana
