= Foam slider =

Flat toy sled for winter recreation

Foam slider / Foam sled

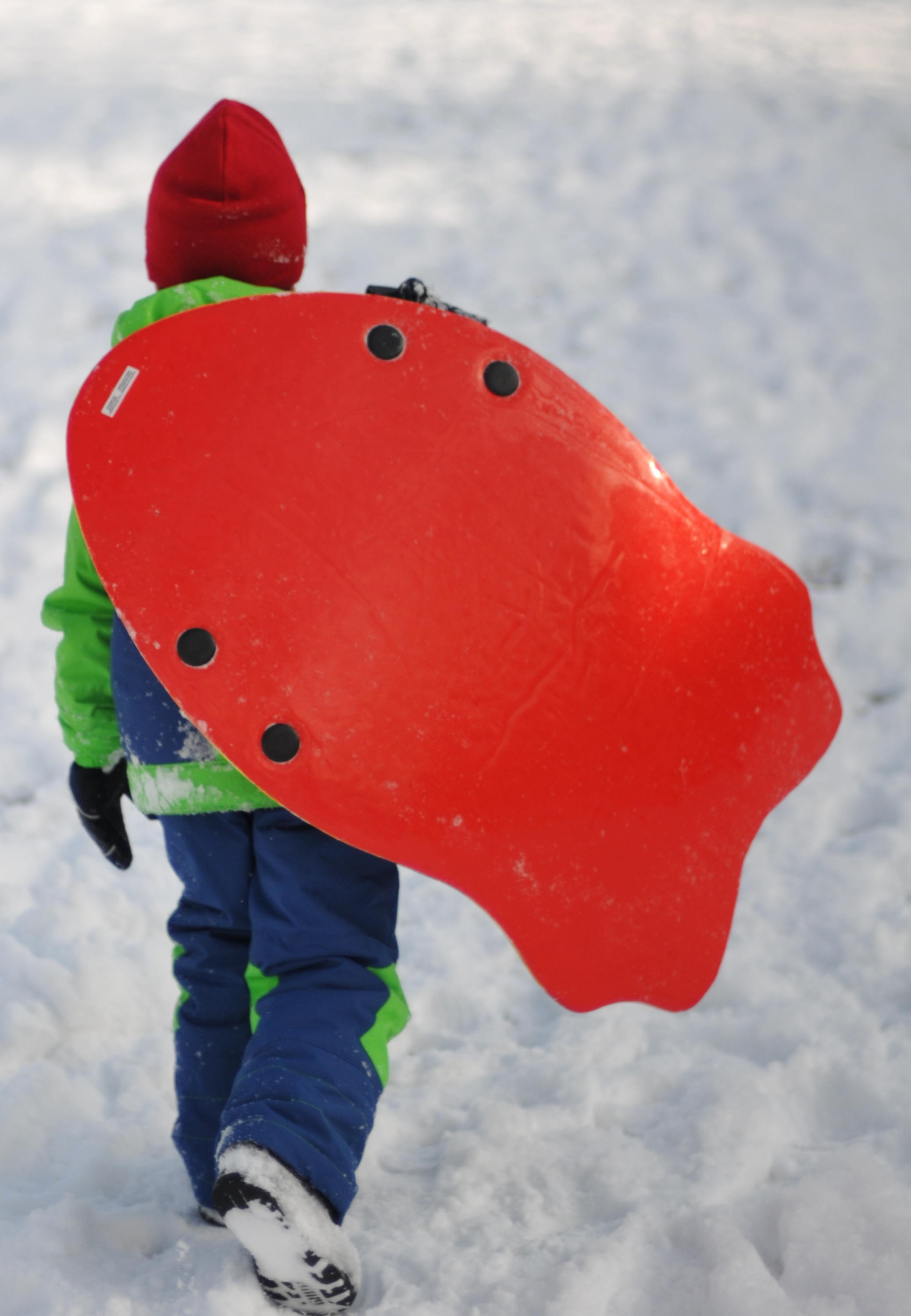
Rigid foam sled

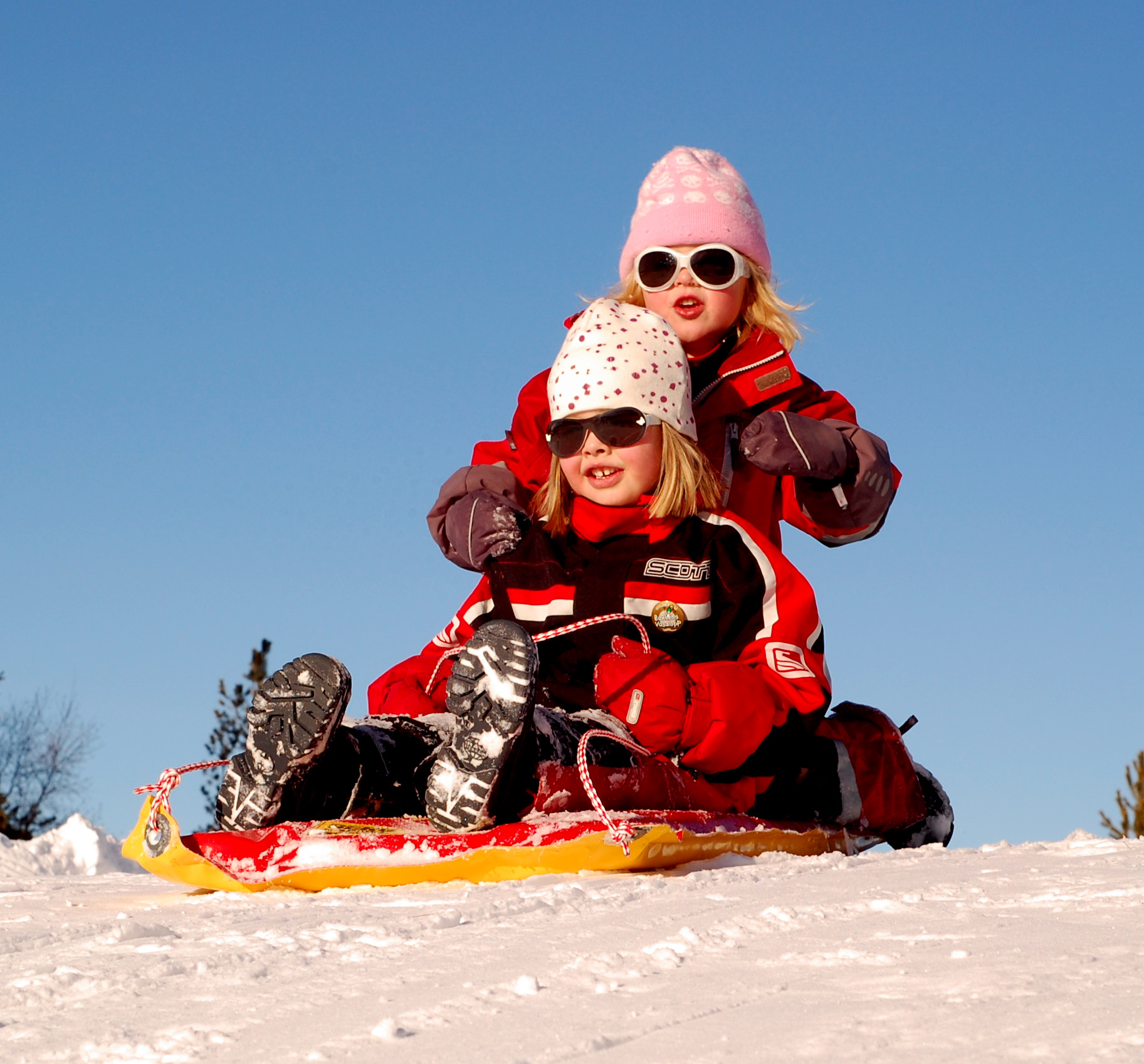
Flexible foam sled

A foam slider or foam sled is a type of flat, open, toy sled for winter recreation, consisting of a protected foam rubber pad or mattress. Such are comparable to pulks and toboggans of similar nature, and may be rigid or flexible. Compared to other types of sleds, foam sliders are lightweight and easier to carry uphill, but less durable.

== See also ==
- Bum slider
- Saucer sled

== Sources ==
- Leonard, Brendan (2017-03-21). The Great Outdoors: A User's Guide: Everything You Need to Know Before Heading into the Wild (and How to Get Back in One Piece). Workman Publishing Company. ISBN 978-1-57965-782-6.
