= Sliders, Virginia =

Unincorporated community in Virginia, United States

Coordinates: 37°27′26″N 78°41′5″W

Sliders is an unincorporated community in Buckingham County, in the U.S. state of Virginia.
