= Toboggan =

Simple sled

A toboggan is a simple sled used in snowy winter recreation. It is also a traditional form of cargo transport used by the Innu, Cree and Ojibwe of North America, sometimes part of a dog train.

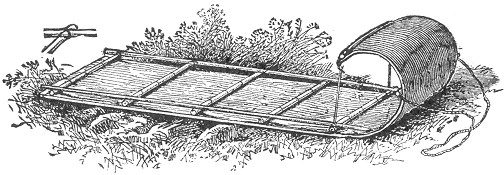
Illustration of a toboggan

It is used on snow to carry one or more people (often children) down a slope for recreation, or as a rescue sled. Designs vary from simple, traditional models to modern engineered composites. A toboggan differs from most sleds or sleighs in that it has no runners or skis (or only low ones) on the underside. The bottom of a toboggan rides directly on the snow. Some parks include designated toboggan hills where ordinary sleds are not allowed and which may include toboggan runs similar to bobsleigh courses.

The term toboggan is sometimes used to refer to any type of sled, a knit wool cap, or for the conveyance used in some amusement park rides and water slides.

Toboggans can vary depending on the climate and geographical region. An example is Tangalooma (Australia) where toboggans are made from Masonite boards and used for travelling down steep sand dunes at speeds up to 40 km/h (25 mph).

== Etymology ==
The term toboggan likely comes from an Algonquin language word for sled, possibly from the Mi'kmaq tepaqan, or the Abenaki odabôgan. For the French Canadians this became tabaganne.

== History ==
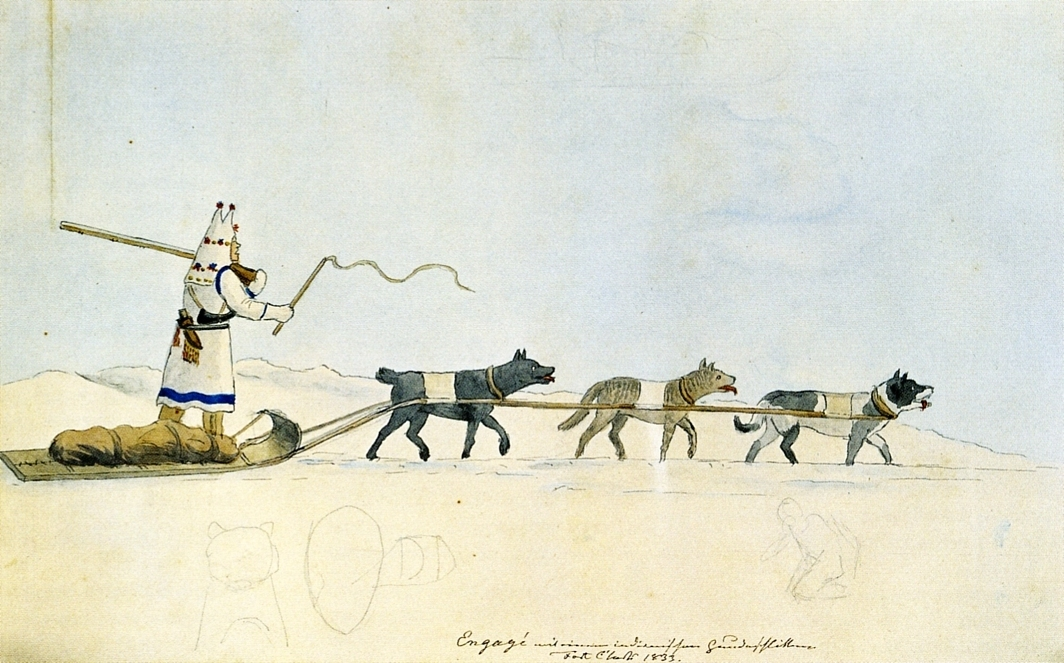
Toboggan pulled by dogs, 1833 watercolor

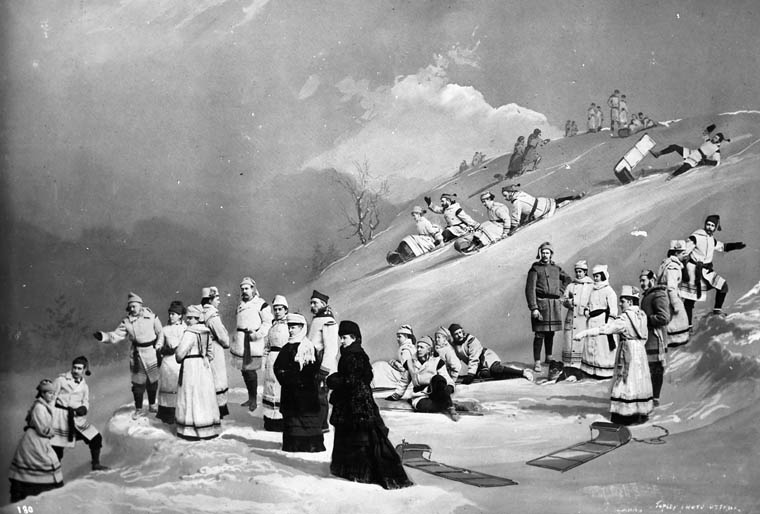
The Toboggan Party, Rideau Hall, illuminated composite photograph from Lady Dufferin's personal album. c. 1872–1875

Toboggan was originally an Algonquian term for a type of man-hauled cargo sledge made from bark, hardwood or whalebone, and deer or buffalo hide. Sledges of this type have been in use on the Great Plains and the Great Lakes since 3000 BCE. During the tribes' yearly migration to their winter campsites, these sledges were used to transport bulky personal possessions and small children before the introduction of the wheel. A smaller variant of the toboggan, used for recreational purposes, was known as a Tom Pung.

As Europeans settled traditional Algonquian lands, the term was absorbed as an English loanword and applied to the low-profile wooden sledges made by the colonists. First used for small cargo transport by some fur trappers, mail carriers and prospectors, recreational toboggan usage was noted at Montreal (1835), Halifax (1869), Ottawa (1870), and Boston (1883). Transition from utility to recreational usage is depicted in contemporary illustrations from Joseph-François Lafitau (1724), Peter Rindisbacher (1824), Karl Bodmer (1839), Philip John Bainbrigge (1840), William Henry Napier (1842), Paul Kane (1846), James D. Duncan (1850) and Cornelius Krieghoff (1863).

=== Toboggan slide ===
Artificial slides, many with an adjacent return climb stairway, were constructed at Ottawa (1877), Davos (1879), Montreal (1879), Quebec City (1884), Saratoga Springs, New York (1884), Saint Paul (1885) then quickly spread across the U.S. northeast (Albany, Burlington) and midwest (Chicago, Grand Forks). By the 1930s there were toboggan slides in 36 U.S. states.

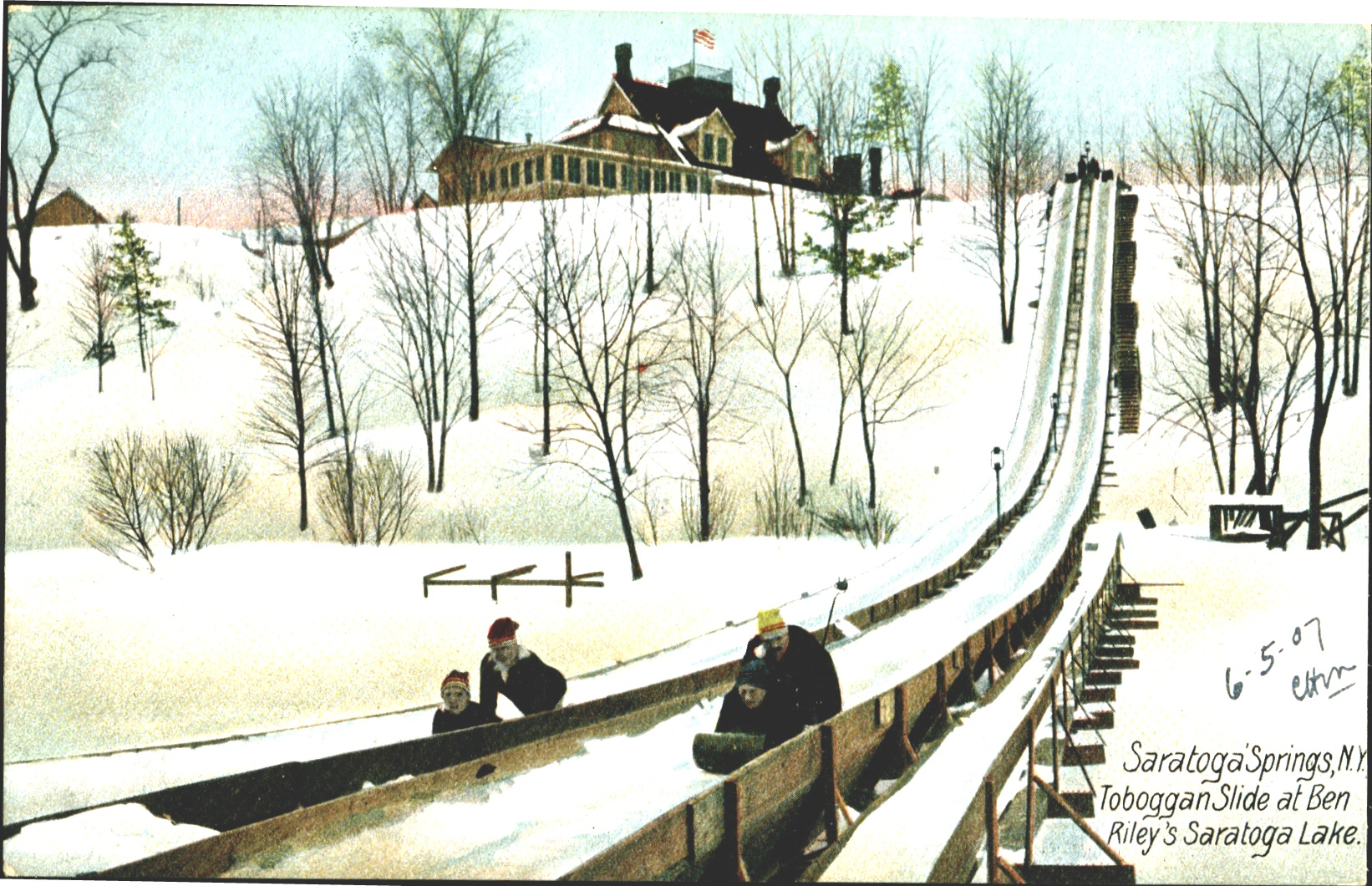
Saratoga Springs toboggan run, 1907

Early clubs were formed at Montreal (1879), Woodlawn Park (1884), Burlington (1884), Lansdowne (1884), Ottawa (1885), Saint Paul (1885), and Essex (1886). A specific uniform color combination and badge identified club members and granted access to private slides.

=== Amusement ride ===
Philadelphia Toboggan Company was established in 1904 for building amusement rides, without snow.

A ride called a toboggan has been a feature of the Munich Oktoberfest since 1906. Riders slide down a chute on toboggan-like carpets.

In 1913 Nikolai Kobelkoff established the Toboggan ride in Vienna’s Wurstelprater amusement park.

== Design and use ==
The Mountaineer [Innu] method is the only one adapted for the interior parts of the country: their sleds are made of two thin boards of birch; each about six inches broad, a quarter of an inch thick, and six feet long: these are fastened parallel to each other by slight battens, sewed on with thongs of deer-skin; and the foremost end is curved up to rise over the inequalities of the snow. Each individual who is able to walk, is furnished with one of these; but those for the children are proportionately less. On them they stow all their goods, and also their infants; which they bundle up very warm in deer-skins. The two ends of a leather thong are tied to the corners of the sled; the bight or double part of which is placed against the breast, and in that manner it is drawn along. The men go first, relieving each other in the lead by turns; the women follow next, and the children, according to their strength, bring up the rear; and, as they all walk in rackets (snowshoes), the third or fourth person finds an excellent path to walk on, let the snow be ever so light.

— Captain Cartwright and his Labrador Journal (1911)

The traditional North American toboggan is made of bound, lengthwise parallel wood slats, all bent up and backwards at the front to form a recumbent 'J' shape. A thin rope is run across the edge of the curved front to provide rudimentary steering. The frontmost rider places their feet in the curved front space and sits on the flat bed; any others sit behind them and grasp the waist of the person before them.

Modern recreational toboggans are typically manufactured from wood, plastic or aluminum. Larger, more rugged models are made for commercial or rescue use.

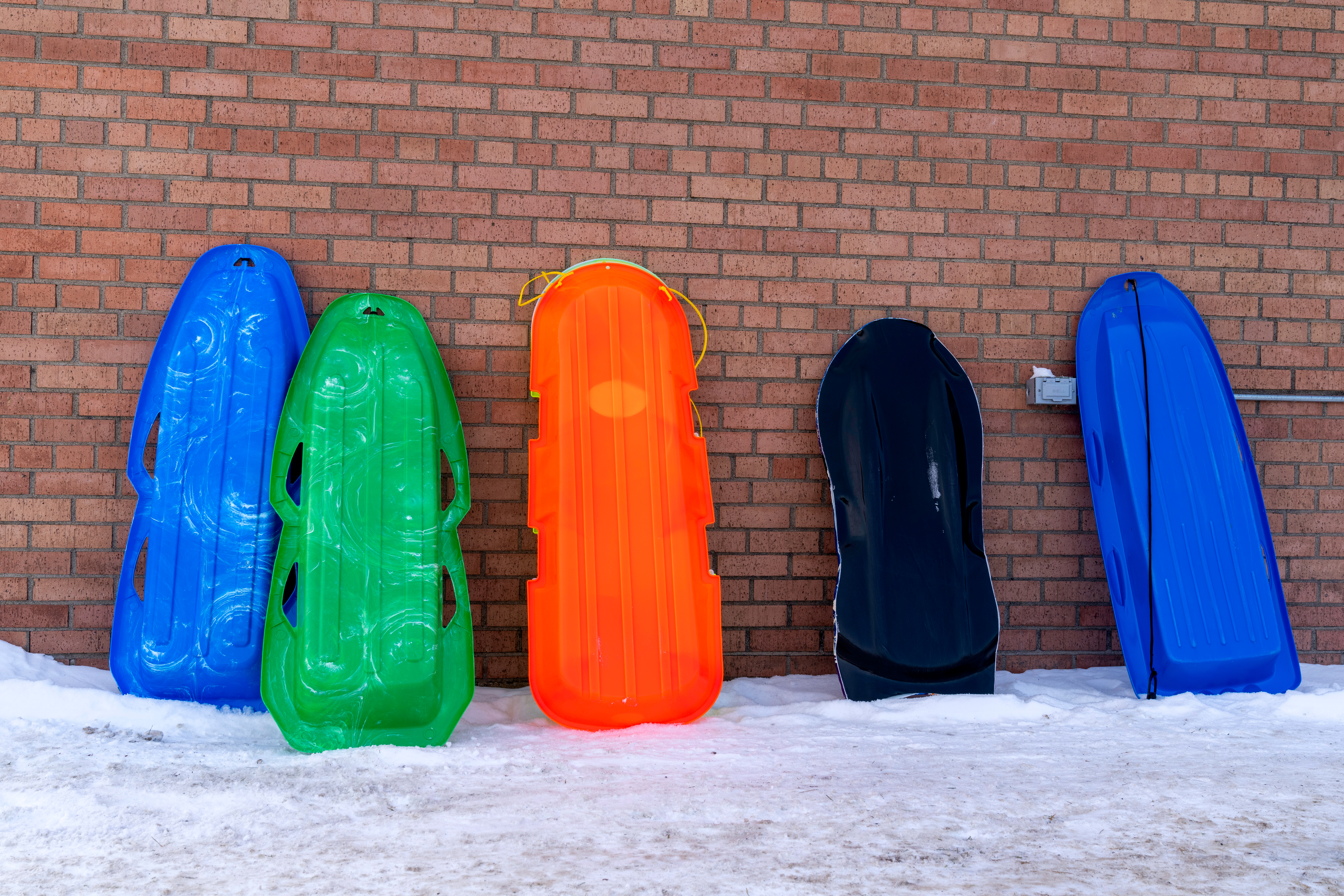
Plastic toboggans

From 1923 to 2014 the International Bobsleigh and Tobogganing Federation (Fédération Internationale de Bobsleigh et de Tobogganing or FIBT) governed the organized sports of Bobsled and Skeleton. A U.S. National Toboggan Race began in 1936, and was revived in 1990.

== See also ==
- Bobsled
- Foam slider
- Luge
- Pulk
- Sled
- Travois
