= Sliding (motion) =

Relative motion of two surfaces in contact or separated by a thin film of fluid

Sliding is a type of motion between two surfaces in contact. This can be contrasted to rolling motion. Both types of motion may occur in bearings.

The relative motion or tendency toward such motion between two surfaces is resisted by friction. This means that the force of friction always acts on an object in the direction opposite to its velocity (relative to the surface it's sliding on). Friction may damage or "wear" the surfaces in contact. However, wear can be reduced by lubrication. The science and technology of friction, lubrication, and wear is known as tribology.

Sliding may occur between two objects of arbitrary shape, whereas rolling friction is the frictional force associated with the rotational movement of a somewhat disclike or other circular object along a surface. Generally, the frictional force of rolling friction is less than that associated with sliding kinetic friction. Typical values for the coefficient of rolling friction are less than that of sliding friction. Correspondingly sliding friction typically produces greater sound and thermal bi-products. One of the most common examples of sliding friction is the movement of braking motor vehicle tires on a roadway, a process which generates considerable heat and sound, and is typically taken into account in assessing the magnitude of roadway noise pollution.

== Sliding friction ==
Sliding friction (also called kinetic friction) is a contact force that resists the sliding motion of two objects or an object and a surface. Sliding friction is almost always less than that of static friction; this is why it is easier to move an object once it starts moving rather than to get the object to begin moving from a rest position.

$F_{k} = \mu_{k} \cdot N$

Where F_{k}, is the force of kinetic friction. μ_{k} is the coefficient of kinetic friction, and N is the normal force.

== Examples of sliding friction ==
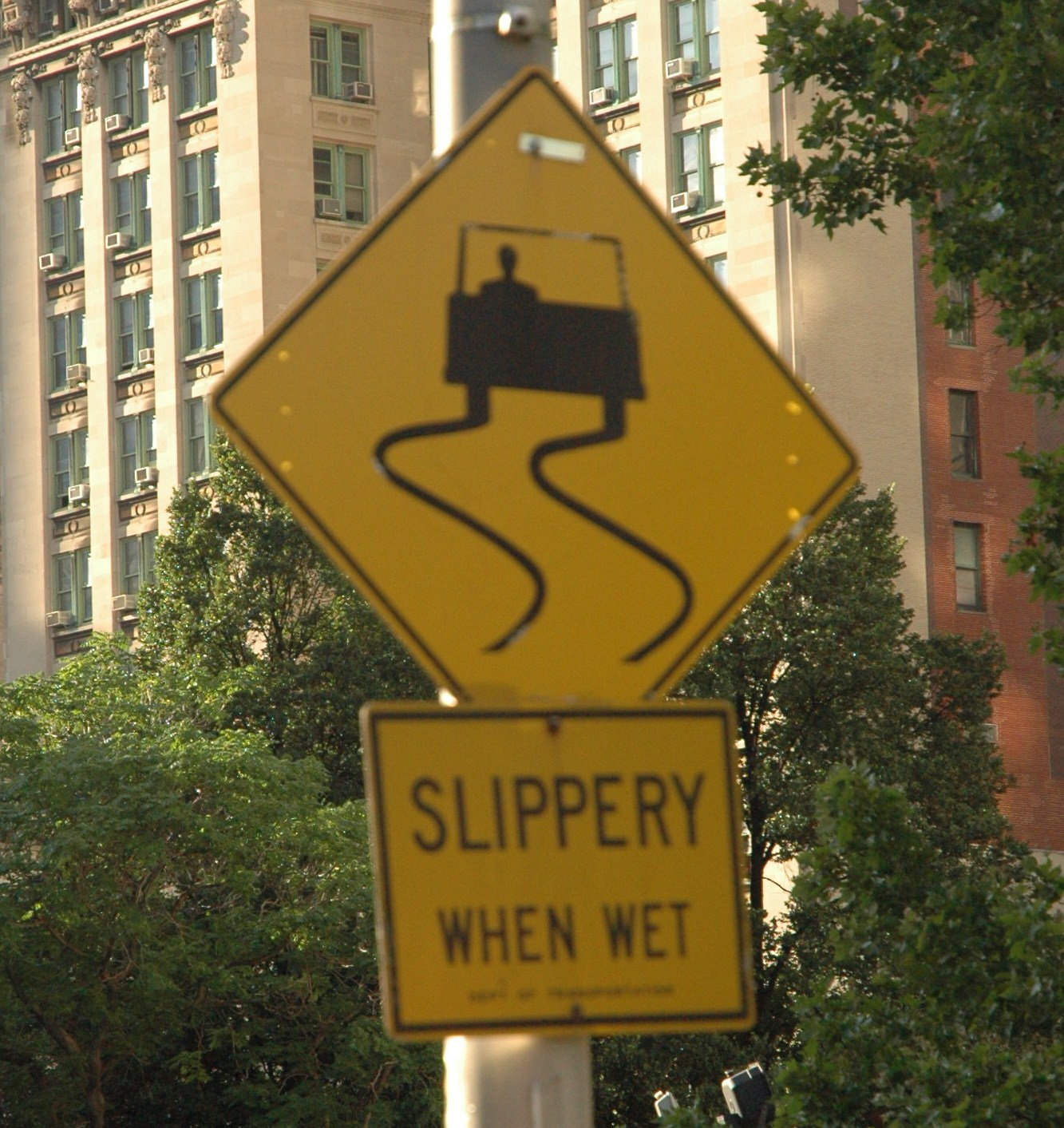
Slippery when wet signs alert drivers that they need to slow down because the kinetic friction between the tires and a wet surface is much less than that of a dry surface.

- Sledding
- Pushing an object across a surface
- Rubbing one's hands together (The friction force generates heat.)
- A car sliding on ice
- A car skidding as it turns a corner
- Opening a window
- Almost any motion where there is contact between an object and a surface

Animation of an idealized prism sliding across a flat plane

- Falling down a bowling lane

== Motion of sliding friction ==
The motion of sliding friction can be modelled (in simple systems of motion) by Newton's second law

$\sum F = ma$

$F_E - F_k = ma$

Where $F_E$ is the external force.

- Acceleration occurs when the external force is greater than the force of kinetic friction.
- Slowing Down (or Stopping) occurs when the force of kinetic friction is greater than that of the external force.
  - This also follows Newton's first law of motion as there exists a net force on the object.
- Constant Velocity occurs when there is no net force on the object, that is the external force is equal to force of kinetic friction.

=== Motion on an inclined plane ===
Free body diagram for a block subject to friction as it slides on an inclined plane

A common problem presented in introductory physics classes is a block subject to friction as it slides up or down an inclined plane. This is shown in the free body diagram to the right.

The component of the force of gravity in the direction of the incline is given by:

$F_g = mg\sin{\theta}$

The normal force (perpendicular to the surface) is given by:

$N = mg\cos{\theta}$

Therefore, since the force of friction opposes the motion of the block,

$F_k =\mu_k \cdot mg\cos{\theta}$

To find the coefficient of kinetic friction on an inclined plane, one must find the moment where the force parallel to the plane is equal to the force perpendicular; this occurs when the block is moving at a constant velocity at some angle $\theta$

$\sum F = ma = 0$

$F_k = F_g$ or $\mu_k mg\cos{\theta} = mg\sin{\theta}$

Here it is found that:

$\mu_k = \frac{mg\sin{\theta}}{mg\cos{\theta}} = \tan{\theta}$ where $\theta$ is the angle at which the block begins moving at a constant velocity
