= List of Boston University people =

This is a list of notable faculty members and alumni of Boston University.

== Legend ==
The following abbreviations and notes are used to represent BU schools and colleges:

Abbr.	Meaning
CAS	College of Arts and Sciences
COM	College of Communication
WED	College of Education
ENG	College of Engineering
CFA	College of Fine Arts
CGS	College of General Studies
SAR	College of Health and Rehabilitation Sciences
QST	School of Business
DMD	School of Dental Medicine
SHA	School of Hospitality Administration
LAW	School of Law
MED	School of Medicine
SPH	School of Public Health
SSW	School of Social Work
MET	Metropolitan College
KHC	Kilachand Honors College
UNI	University Professors Program

== Academy Awards ==
Academy Awards
Name	Degree	Award	Result	Award year	Selected work
Harold Russell	QST '49	Best Supporting Actor	Won	1946	The Best Years of Our Lives
Steve Broidy	CFA '27*	Jean Hersholt Humanitarian Award	Won	1962	"whose humanitarian efforts have brought credit to the industry"
Faye Dunaway	CFA '62	Best Actress	Nominated	1967	Bonnie and Clyde
Estelle Parsons	LAW '53*	Best Supporting Actress	Won	1967	Bonnie and Clyde
Estelle Parsons	LAW '53*	Best Supporting Actress	Nominated	1968	Rachel, Rachel
Faye Dunaway	CFA '62	Best Actress	Nominated	1975	Chinatown
Faye Dunaway	CFA '62	Best Actress	Won	1977	Network
Mariel Hemingway	CFA '83	Best Supporting Actress	Nominated	1979	Manhattan
Peter Ladue	COM '81	Best Documentary Short	Won	1980	Karl Hess: Toward Liberty
Alfre Woodard	CFA '74	Best Supporting Actress	Nominated	1983	Cross Creek
Olympia Dukakis	CFA '57	Best Supporting Actress	Won	1987	Moonstruck
Fred Zollo	CAS '75	Best Picture	Nominated	1988	Mississippi Burning
Geena Davis	CFA '79	Best Supporting Actress	Won	1989	The Accidental Tourist
Geena Davis	CFA '79	Best Actress	Nominated	1992	Thelma & Louise
Marisa Tomei	CFA '86*	Best Supporting Actress	Won	1993	My Cousin Vinny
Julianne Moore	CFA '83	Best Supporting Actress	Nominated	1998	Boogie Nights
Richard Gladstein	COM '83	Best Picture	Nominated	1999	The Cider House Rules
Rick Heinrichs	CFA '76	Best Production Design	Won	1999	Sleepy Hollow
Julianne Moore	CFA '83	Best Actress	Nominated	2000	The End of the Affair
Marisa Tomei	CFA '86*	Best Supporting Actress	Nominated	2002	In the Bedroom
Julianne Moore	CFA '83	Best Actress	Nominated	2003	Far from Heaven
Julianne Moore	CFA '83	Best Supporting Actress	Nominated	2003	The Hours
Michael Williams	COM '79	Best Documentary Feature	Won	2003	The Fog of War
Richard Gladstein	COM '83	Best Picture	Nominated	2004	Finding Neverland
Rick Heinrichs	CFA '76	Best Production Design	Nominated	2004	Lemony Snicket's A Series of Unfortunate Events
Corinne Marrinan	CFA '95	Best Documentary Short	Won	2005	A Note of Triumph
Hawk Ostby	COM '90	Best Adapted Screenplay	Nominated	2006	Children of Men
Mark Fergus	QST '89	Best Adapted Screenplay	Nominated	2006	Children of Men
Rick Heinrichs	CFA '76	Best Production Design	Nominated	2006	Pirates of the Caribbean: Dead Man's Chest
Marisa Tomei	CFA '86*	Best Supporting Actress	Nominated	2009	The Wrestler
Scott Silver	COM '86	Best Original Screenplay	Nominated	2011	The Fighter
Peter Del Vecho	CFA '80	Best Animated Feature	Won	2013	Frozen
Julianne Moore	CFA '83	Best Actress	Won	2014	Still Alice
Roy Conli	CFA '83	Best Animated Feature	Won	2014	Big Hero 6
Bonnie Arnold	COM '78	Best Animated Feature	Nominated	2014	How to Train Your Dragon 2
Henry Hughes	COM '06	Best Live Action Short Film	Nominated	2015	Day One
Brian McLean	CFA '99	Best Visual Effects	Nominated	2016	Kubo and the Two Strings
Tatiana S. Riegel	CAS '86	Best Film Editing	Nominated	2017	I, Tonya
Bonnie Arnold	COM '78	Best Animated Feature	Nominated	2019	How to Train Your Dragon 3
Geena Davis	CFA '79	Jean Hersholt Humanitarian Award	Won	2019	"whose humanitarian efforts have brought credit to the industry"
Scott Silver	COM '86	Best Original Screenplay	Nominated	2020	Joker
Peter Del Vecho	CFA '80	Best Animated Feature	Nominated	2021	Raya and the Last Dragon
Hong Chau	COM '01	Best Supporting Actress	Nominated	2022	The Whale

== Pulitzer Prize winners ==
Pulitzer Prize winners
Name	Degree	Award	Year	Outlet	Rationale
Gerard M. O'Neill	CAS '70	Investigative Reporting	1972	The Boston Globe	"For their exposure of widespread corruption in Somerville, Massachusetts"
Stephen Kurkjian	CAS '66	Investigative Reporting	1972	The Boston Globe	"For their exposure of widespread corruption in Somerville, Massachusetts"
William Sherman	CAS '69	Investigative Reporting	1974	New York Daily News	"For his resourceful investigative reporting in the exposure of extreme abuse of the New York Medicaid program"
Stephen Kurkjian	CAS '66	Investigative Reporting	1980	The Boston Globe	"For articles on Boston's transit system"
Joan Vennochi	COM '75	Investigative Reporting	1980	The Boston Globe	"For articles on Boston's transit system"
Stan Grossfeld	CAS '80	Breaking News Photography	1984	The Boston Globe	"For his series of unusual photographs which reveal the effects of war on the people of Lebanon"
Mark Thompson	COM '75	Public Service	1985	Fort Worth Star-Telegram	"For reporting by Mark Thompson which revealed that nearly 250 U.S. servicemen had lost their lives as a result of a design problem in helicopters built by Bell Helicopter - a revelation which ultimately led the Army to ground almost 600 Huey helicopters pending their modification"
Stan Grossfeld	CAS '80	Feature Photography	1985	The Boston Globe	"For his series of photographs of the famine in Ethiopia and for his pictures of illegal aliens on the U.S.-Mexico border."
Joseph Hallinan	COM '84	Investigative Reporting	1991	The Indianapolis Star	"For their shocking series on medical malpractice in [Indiana]"
Don Van Natta Jr.	COM '86	Public Service	1993	The Miami Herald	"For coverage that not only helped readers cope with Hurricane Andrew's devastation but also showed how lax zoning, inspection and building codes had contributed to the destruction"
Don Van Natta Jr.	COM '86	National Reporting	1999	The New York Times	"For a series of articles that disclosed the corporate sale of American technology to China, with U.S. government approval despite national security risks, prompting investigations and significant changes in policy"
Jhumpa Lahiri	CAS '93, UNI '95, UNI '97	Fiction	2000	-	For Interpreter of Maladies
Don Van Natta Jr.	COM '86	Explanatory Reporting	2002	The New York Times	"For its informed and detailed reporting, before and after the September 11th attacks on the USA, that profiled the global terrorism network and the threats it posed"
Sacha Pfeiffer	CAS '94	Public Service	2003	The Boston Globe	"For its courageous, comprehensive coverage of sexual abuse by priests, an effort that pierced secrecy, stirred local, national and international reaction and produced changes in the Roman Catholic Church"
Michael Rezendes	CAS '78	Public Service	2003	The Boston Globe	"for its courageous, comprehensive coverage of sexual abuse by priests, an effort that pierced secrecy, stirred local, national and international reaction and produced changes in the Roman Catholic Church"
Stephen Kurkjian	CAS '66	Public Service	2003	The Boston Globe	"For its courageous, comprehensive coverage of sexual abuse by priests, an effort that pierced secrecy, stirred local, national and international reaction and produced changes in the Roman Catholic Church"
Tyler Hicks	COM '92	International Reporting	2009	The New York Times	"For its masterful, groundbreaking coverage of America's deepening military and political challenges in Afghanistan and Pakistan, reporting frequently done under perilous conditions."
Tyler Hicks	COM '92	Breaking News Photography	2014	The New York Times	"For courageously documenting a deadly terrorist attack at a Nairobi shopping mall"
Tyler Hicks	COM '92	Breaking News Photography	2016	The New York Times	"For photographs that captured the resolve of refugees, the perils of their journeys and the struggle of host countries to take them in."
Kimbriell Kelly	COM '98	National Reporting	2016	The Washington Post	"For its revelatory initiative in creating and using a national database to illustrate how often and why the police shoot to kill and who the victims are most likely to be."
Jessica Rinaldi	COM '01	Feature Photography	2016	Boston Globe	"For the raw and revealing photographic story of a boy who strives to find his footing after abuse by those he trusted."
Carl Phillips	CAS '93	Poetry	2023	-	Then the War: And Selected Poems, 2007-2020

== Academia ==
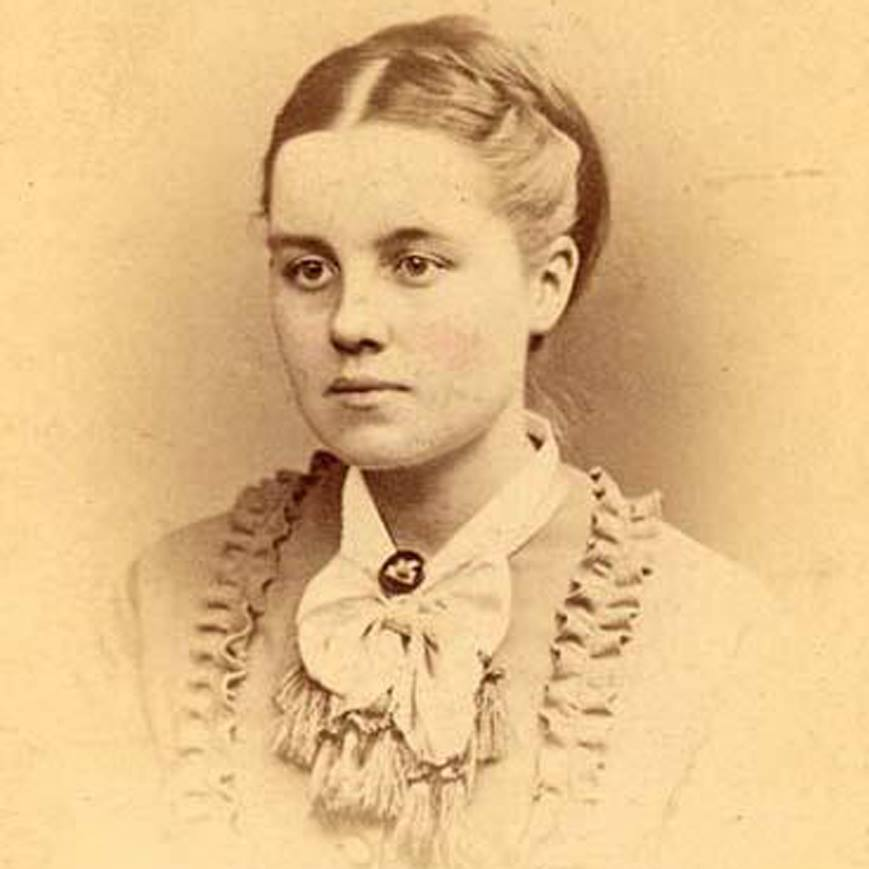
Helen Magill White (GRS 1877) – first woman in the US to earn a Ph.D.

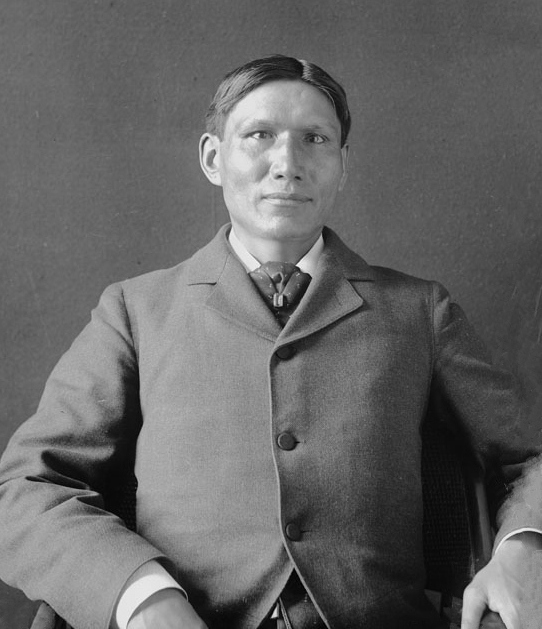
Charles Eastman (MED 1890) – first Native American in the US to earn an MD

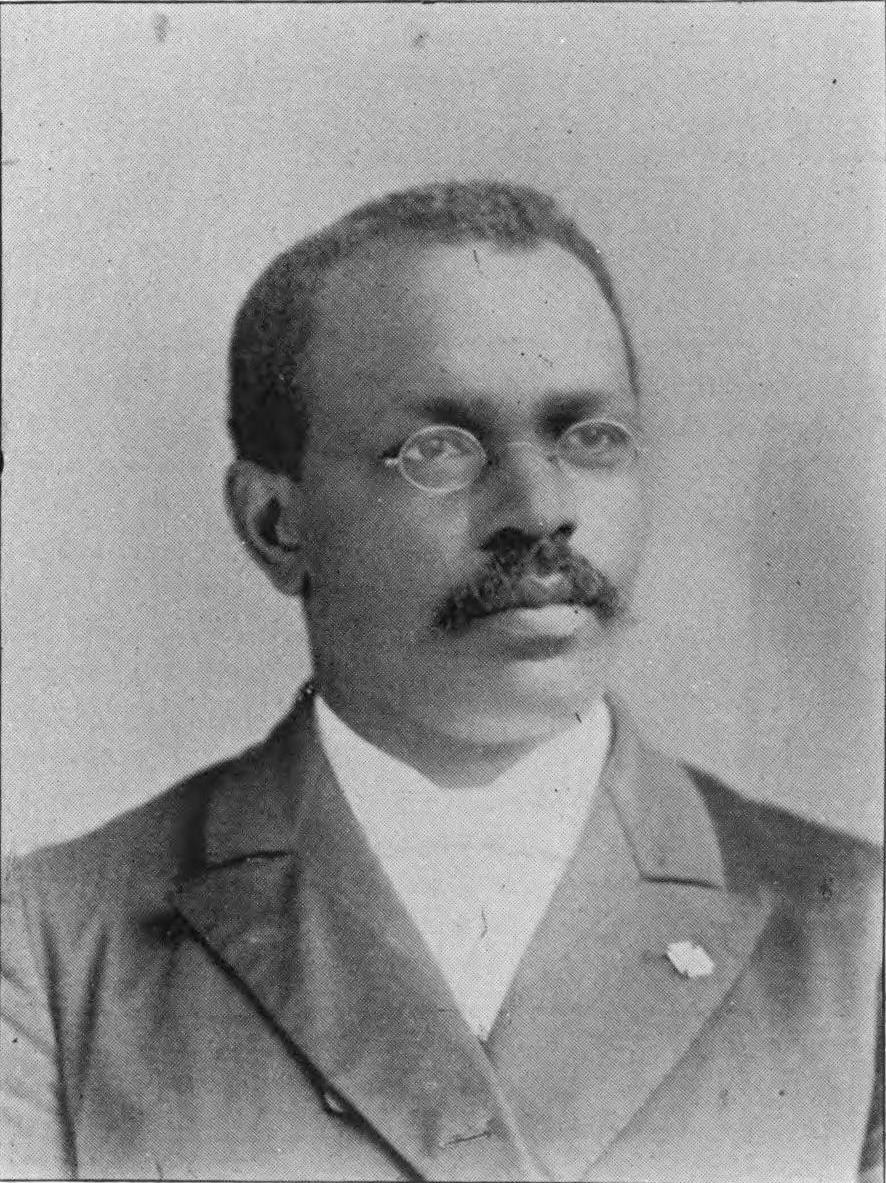
John W. Bowen (STH 1885, STH 1887) – second African American person, and the first person born a slave, to earn a Ph.D.

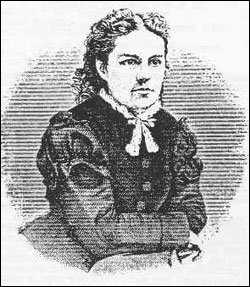
Anna Oliver (STH 1876) – first woman in the US to earn a degree in theology
- Mercy B. Jackson (MED 1860) – physician, one of the first women to receive a Doctor of Medicine degree, in the United States
- Rebecca Lee Crumpler (MED 1864) – first African American woman in the US to receive an MD, or Doctor of Medicine degree, one of first female physician authors in the 19th century
- Anna Oliver (STH 1876) – first woman in the US to receive a degree in theology
- Helen Magill White (GRS 1877) – first woman in the US to earn a Ph.D.
- Takeo Kikuchi (LAW 1877) – one of first Japanese to study law in the U.S., founder and president of Tokyo's Chuo University
- Charles Wesley Emerson (School of Oratory, 1877) – founder of Emerson College
- Marion Talbot (CAS 1880) – influential leader in the early 20th-century higher education of women, fought against efforts to restrict equal access to educational opportunities as Dean of Women at the University of Chicago (1895–1925), co-founded the American Association of University Women with her mentor Ellen Swallow Richards, the first woman admitted to MIT
- Nathan Abbott (LAW 1881) – founder of Stanford Law School and its first dean
- Lelia J. Robinson (LAW 1881) – first woman admitted to the bar in Massachusetts* Solon Irving Bailey (CAS 1881, GRS 1884) – astronomer, elected to American Academy of Arts and Sciences in 1892
- John Calvin Ferguson (CAS 1883) – art historian, influential in early 20th-century education in China, founder of Nanking University, National Chiao Tung University, Shanghai Jiao Tong University, and Xi'an Jiaotong University in China
- Samuel G. Plantz (STH 1883) – president of Lawrence College
- Charles Eastman (MED 1890) – physician, one of the first Native Americans to receive an MD in the U.S., prolific author and speaker on Sioux ethnohistory and Native American affairs
- Mary Kingsbury Simkhovitch (CAS 1890) – pioneering urban planner and social worker, founder of Greenwich House
- Cora Smith Eaton (MED 1892) – suffragist, physician and mountaineer, first woman licensed to practice medicine in North Dakota
- Solomon Carter Fuller (MED 1897) – discovered Alzheimer's disease through observations of neurofibrillary tangles and miliary plaques, publishing the first comprehensive review of the disease, noted as the first Black psychiatrist in the US
- Percy Jewett Burrell (School of Oratory, 1898) – creator of pageantry in the US
- Gleason Archer, Sr. (CAS 1904, LAW 1906) – founder of Suffolk University and Suffolk University Law School
- Leonard Porter Ayres (GRS '10) – statistician, best-known work dealt with comprehensive statistical studies of American casualties in the first and second world wars
- Shields Warren (CAS '18) – pathologist, helped establish field of radiobiology, first to study the pathology of radioactive fallout, discovered that susceptibility to cancer varied from person to person, mentored Eleanor Josephine Macdonald
- Priscilla Fairfield Bok (CAS '18) – astronomer, author, director of Steward Observatory in Arizona, published textbook The Milky Way, coining the popular term "Milky Way"
- Helen B. Taussig (CAS '25) – founded the field of pediatric cardiology, known for her work in banning thalidomide, first woman and first pediatrician to be elected head of the American Heart Association, awarded a Presidential Medal of Freedom (1964)
- Myrtle Bachelder (WED '39) – chemist noted for her secret work on the Manhattan Project atomic bomb program, contributions to the purification of the rare elements and to astrochemistry, for her analysis of Moon rocks collected during the Apollo missions
- Fe Del Mundo (MED '40) – National Scientist of the Philippines and recipient of the Ramon Magsaysay Award, the Nobel Prize of Asia, founded the first pediatric hospital in the Philippines and is known for shaping the modern child healthcare system in the Philippines
- Samuel L. Myers Sr. (GRS '42) – economist, former university president, education adviser and civil rights advocate
- Esther A. H. Hopkins (CAS '47) – chemist, biophysicist, first African-American woman to earn a Ph.D. from Yale University, attorney for the Massachusetts Department of Environmental Protection
- H. C. Robbins Landon (CFA '47) – musicologist, journalist, historian, BBC broadcaster, best known for his work in rediscovering neglected music by Haydn, correcting misunderstandings about Mozart
- Eldon Hall (GRS '47) – computer scientist, leader of hardware design efforts for the Apollo Guidance Computer (AGC) at the Massachusetts Institute of Technology for the Apollo program
- Rollin Williams (SSW '49) – first African-American professor at the University of Connecticut
- Elma Lewis (WED '50) – one of the first women to receive a MacArthur Foundation Genius Grant, fellow of the American Academy of Arts and Sciences, founder of The Elma Lewis School of Fine Arts and National Center of Afro-American Artists, awarded National Medal of Arts by President Reagan
- Ray Hyman (CAS '50) – one of the founders of the modern skeptical movement, noted critic of parapsychology, research on Hick's Law
- Gertrude Hunter (MED '50) – doctor and professor of medicine, national director of health services
- Nathan Azrin (CAS '51, GRS '52) – psychologist, founder of Token Economics and the CRAFT model
- Raymond Coppinger (CAS '59) – biologist, expert in canine behavior and the origin of the domestic dog, professor at Hampshire College
- Alan L. Gropman (CAS '59) – professor of history and grand strategy, author and lecturer, National Defense University
- Jean Briggs (GRS '60) – anthropologist, American expert on Inuit languages, Lifetime Achievement Award from the American Anthropological Association, a Royal Society of Canada fellow
- William E. Doll Jr. (GRS '60) – educator, curriculum theorist, Lifetime Achievement Award by the American Educational Research Association, among first group of scholars to introduce complexity thinking to education in the 1980s
- Hugo Bedau (GRS '61) – philosopher, best known for work on capital punishment
- Stanley Awramik (CAS '68) – biogeologist, paleontologist, Geological Society of America
- Gabor Boritt (GRS '68) – historian, received the National Humanities Medal in 2008 from Bush
- Diana Chapman Walsh (CAS '71, UNI '83) – president of Wellesley College (1993–2007)
- Lawrence C. Levy (B.S. '72) – executive dean of the National Center for Suburban Studies at Hofstra University, and journalist
- John Nassivera (CAS '72) – author, playwright, Fellow in Columbia University's Society of Fellows in the Humanities
- Theodora J. Kalikow (CAS '74) – president of University of Maine at Farmington (1994–2012)
- Dana Mohler-Faria (CAS '74, 75) – president of Bridgewater State College (2002–2015)
- David P. Baker (MS '75) – sociologist
- Celeste Freytes (SED '77) – interim president of University of Puerto Rico (2013, 2016–2017)
- Owen Flanagan (GRS '78) – philosopher, James B. Duke University Professor of Philosophy, Professor of Neurobiology at Duke University
- Ted Landsmark (GRS '78) – president, Boston Architectural College (1997–2014), Professor of Public Policy at Northeastern University
- Cynthia Gómez (CAS '79) – psychologist, served on Presidential Advisory Council on HIV/AIDS for Bush and Clinton, known for work in field of HIV/AIDS prevention, health care access and health equity for minority groups, founded Health Equity Institute at SFSU
- Philip Kasinitz (CAS '79) – sociologist, Presidential Professor of Sociology at CUNY Graduate Center, PhD Chair in Sociology (2001–)
- I. Michael Leitman (CAS '81, MED '85) – Dean for Graduate Medical Education at Icahn School of Medicine at Mount Sinai
- Richard G. Frank (GRS '82) – economist, known for contributions to health economics, Assistant Secretary of Health and Human Services for Planning and Evaluation under Obama, Professor at Harvard University
- Kevin J. Tracey (MED '83) – CEO, Feinstein Institutes for Medical Research, one of the most cited researchers in the world
- Donald Tomaskovic-Devey (GRS '84) – sociologist, known for his research on labor markets and workplace inequality
- Ruth Agnes Daly (GRS '84, GRS '87) – astrophysicist, fellow of the American Physical Society, professor of Physics at Penn State University, best known for work on the expansion and acceleration histories of the universe
- Andres Jaramillo-Botero (ENG '86) – physicist, known for contributions to first-principles based modeling, design and characterization of nanoscale materials and devices, professor at CalTech
- Drew Weissman (MED '87, MED '87) – Nobel Prize-winning researcher, known for development of mRNA vaccines, the best known of which are those for COVID-19 produced by BioNTech/Pfizer and Moderna. Weissman received the Nobel Prize in Physiology or Medicine in 2023 "for discoveries concerning nucleoside base modifications that enabled the development of effective mRNA vaccines against COVID-19"
- Shoshana Chatfield (CAS '88) – first woman president of the Naval War College (2018–2023)
- David Ciardi (CAS '91) – astrophysicist, NASA Exceptional Scientific Achievement Medal for his work on Kepler and his contributions to the fundamental nature of stellar variability, NASA Silver Achievement Medal as part of the TESS team, staff at CalTech
- Morgan James Peters (CFA '91) – director of Black Studies and associate professor of English, UMass Dartmouth
- Saskia Hamilton (GRS '96) – poet, editor, and university administrator at Barnard College
- Marie Jean Philip (GRS '96) – pioneering researcher in American Sign Language and one of first researchers to focus on ASL and deaf culture, helped establish ASL as a recognized language in the colleges of Massachusetts (early 1980s)
- Richard Bohannon (SAR '93) – highly cited physiotherapy researcher, editor-in-chief of two peer-reviewed medical journals, Journal of Human Muscle Performance, Journal of Geriatric Physical Therapy
- Ha Jin (GRS '94) – writer, National Book Award for Fiction and PEN/Faulkner Award for Waiting (1999), Guggenheim Fellowship (1999), National Book Award (1999), elected to the American Academy of Arts and Letters
- Ben Bahan (GRS '96) – influential figure in American Sign Language literature
- Jeffrey Docking (CAS '96) – president of Adrian College (2005–present)
- Bogdan A. Dobrescu (GRS '97) – theoretical physicist, expert in high-energy physics, scientist at Fermilab
- Christopher Nowinski (GRS '17) – neuroscientist, professional wrestler, known for research on concussions in American football and CTE

== Activism, clergy ==
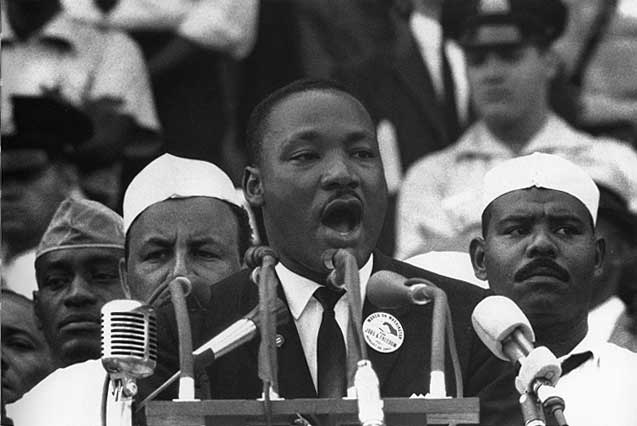
Martin Luther King Jr. (STH '55) – leader of the civil rights movement who advanced the right to vote, desegregation, and labor rights, recipient of the 1964 Nobel Peace Prize, 1977 Presidential Medal of Freedom

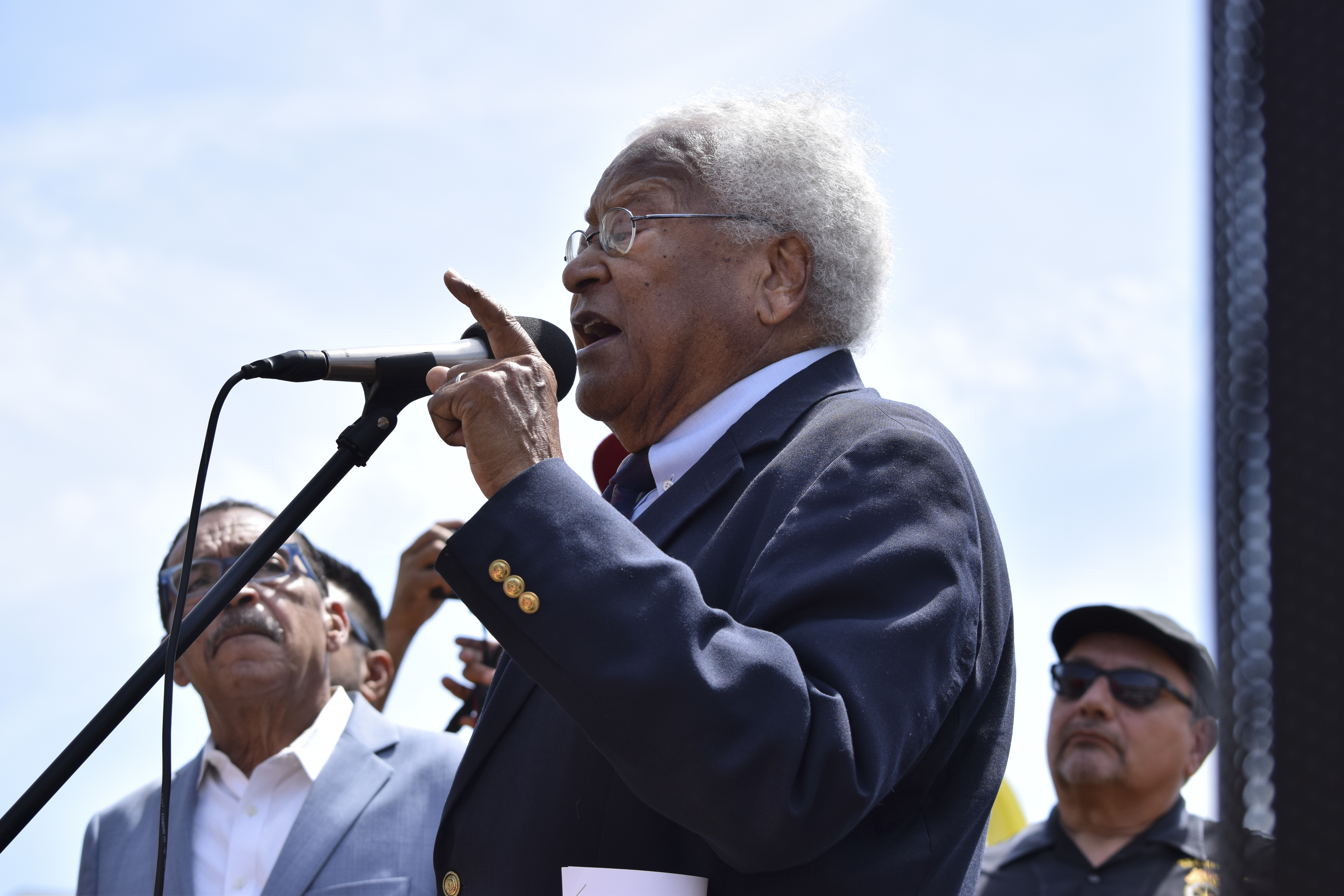
James Lawson (STH '60) – key theoretician, strategist and tactician of nonviolence within the civil rights movement, develop strategy for the Freedom Riders, portrayed by Jesse Williams in The Butler

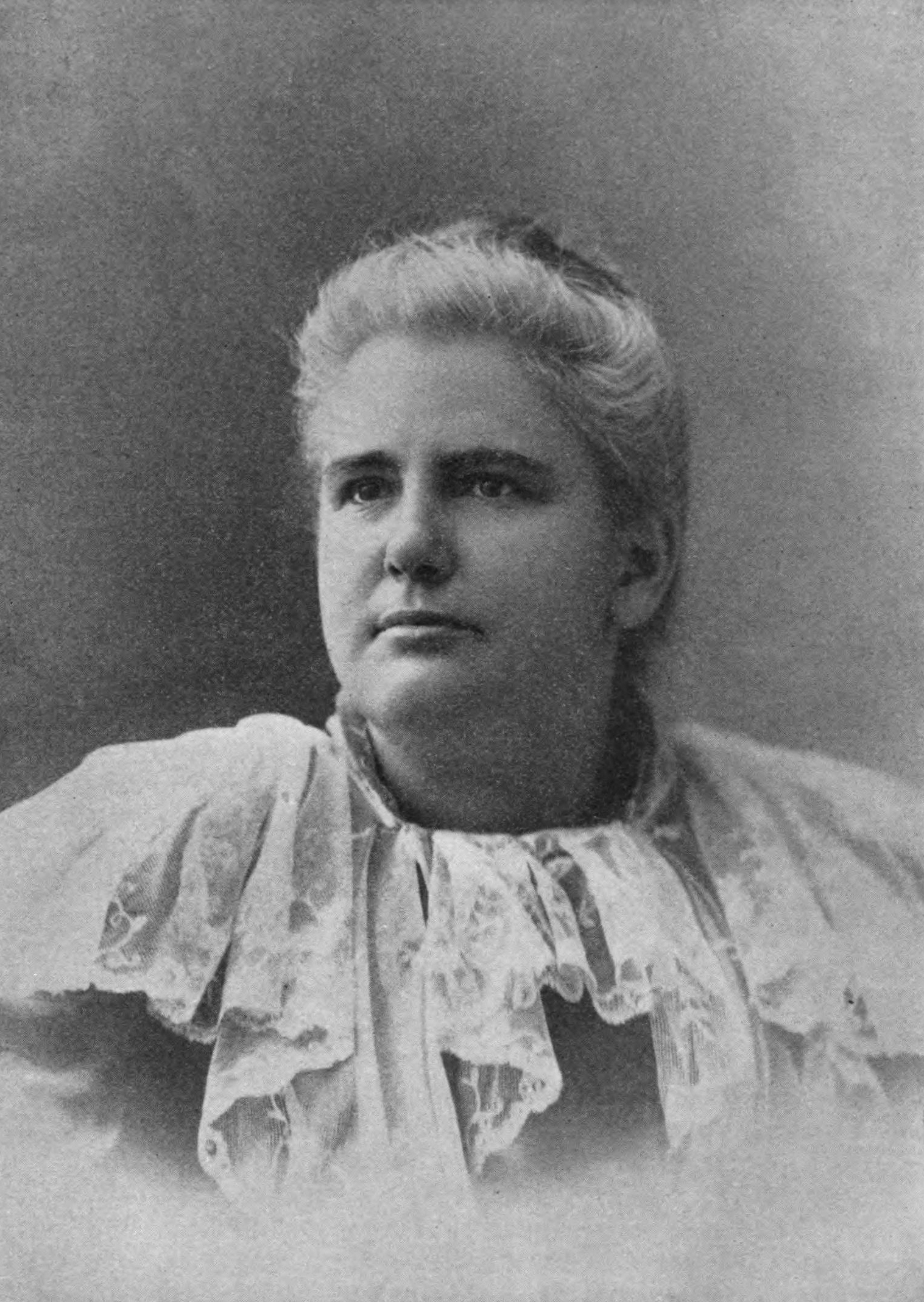
Anna Howard Shaw (STH 1878, MED 1886) – leader of the women's suffrage movement in the U.S. and president of National American Woman Suffrage Association (1904–1915), first woman awarded Distinguished Service Medal

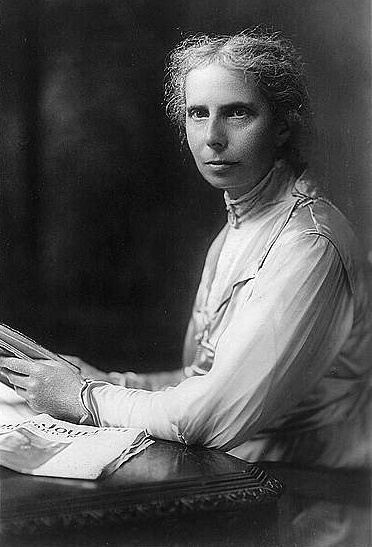
Alice Stone Blackwell (CAS 1881) – influential in merging two competing organizations in the women's suffrage movement into the National American Woman Suffrage Association, daughter of suffragettes Henry Browne Blackwell, Lucy Stone
- Daniel Steele, Methodist theologian
- Martin Luther King Jr. (STH '55) – civil rights leader, 1964 Nobel Peace Prize, 1977 Presidential Medal of Freedom
- W. T. Handy, Jr. (STH) – civil rights leader and bishop of the Missouri Conference of the United Methodist Church
- Anna Howard Shaw (STH 1878, MED 1886) – president of National American Woman Suffrage Association (1904–1915), leading figure in the women's suffrage movement in the U.S., first woman awarded Distinguished Service Medal, one of the first ordained female Methodist ministers in the US
- Alice Stone Blackwell (CAS 1881) – influential in merging two competing organizations in the women's suffrage movement into the National American Woman Suffrage Association, daughter of Henry Browne Blackwell and Lucy Stone, niece of Elizabeth Blackwell
- Makarios III (STH '48) – 1st and 4th president of Cyprus, a key figure in the island's struggle for independence and a symbol of Cypriot national identity
- James Lawson (STH '60) – leading theoretician and tactician of nonviolence within the Civil Rights Movement
- James Forman (GRS '61) – prominent African-American leader in the Civil Rights Movement
- Ruth Batson (WED '76) – civil rights activist known for critical role in desegregation of Boston public schools during the 1960s and 1970s
- James L. Farmer Sr. (STH '13, STH 16', STH '18) – first Texan African-American to earn a PhD, minister in the Methodist Episcopal Church, South, an academic in early religious history and theology, father of James Farmer
- Eugene Callender (CAS '47) – first black pastor in the Christian Reformed Church, active in the civil rights movement alongside Martin Luther King, Jr., pioneers "street academies" for disadvantaged New York City youth
- Travis Roy (COM '00) – leading activist for spinal cord injury survivors, founder of the Travis Roy Foundation
- Jean Kilbourne (GRS '80) – activist filmmaker, Killing Us Softly, known for work on the image of women in advertising and her critical studies of alcohol and tobacco advertising, National Women's Hall of Fame inductee
- Elizabeth Meyer Glaser (WED '70) – child advocate, AIDS activist and co-founder of the Elizabeth Glaser Pediatric AIDS Foundation
- Zalman Schachter-Shalomi (STH '56) – founder of the Jewish Renewal movement, innovator in ecumenical dialogue
- Carl F. H. Henry (STF '49) – theologian, one of the most influential figures in the development of Neo-Evangelicalism
- Roger Blanchard (CAS '32) – bishop of the Episcopal Church, church's bishop of Southern Ohio (1959–1970)
- Andrew Z. Lopatin (CAS '87) – Rhodes Scholar, Orthodox Jewish rabbi and president of Yeshivat Chovevei Torah (1930–1950)
- Walter A. Maier (STH '13) – speaker for The Lutheran Hour radio broadcast (1930–1950)
- Richard Joseph Malone (STH '81) – bishop of Portland (2004–2012), bishop of Buffalo (2012–2019)
- Sybil Haydel Morial (WED '52, WED '55) – civil rights activist and educator
- Woodie W. White (STH '61) – bishop of the United Methodist Church North Central region, bishop-in-residence at Emory University
- Adam Shoemaker, Episcopal clergyman

== Arts and culture ==
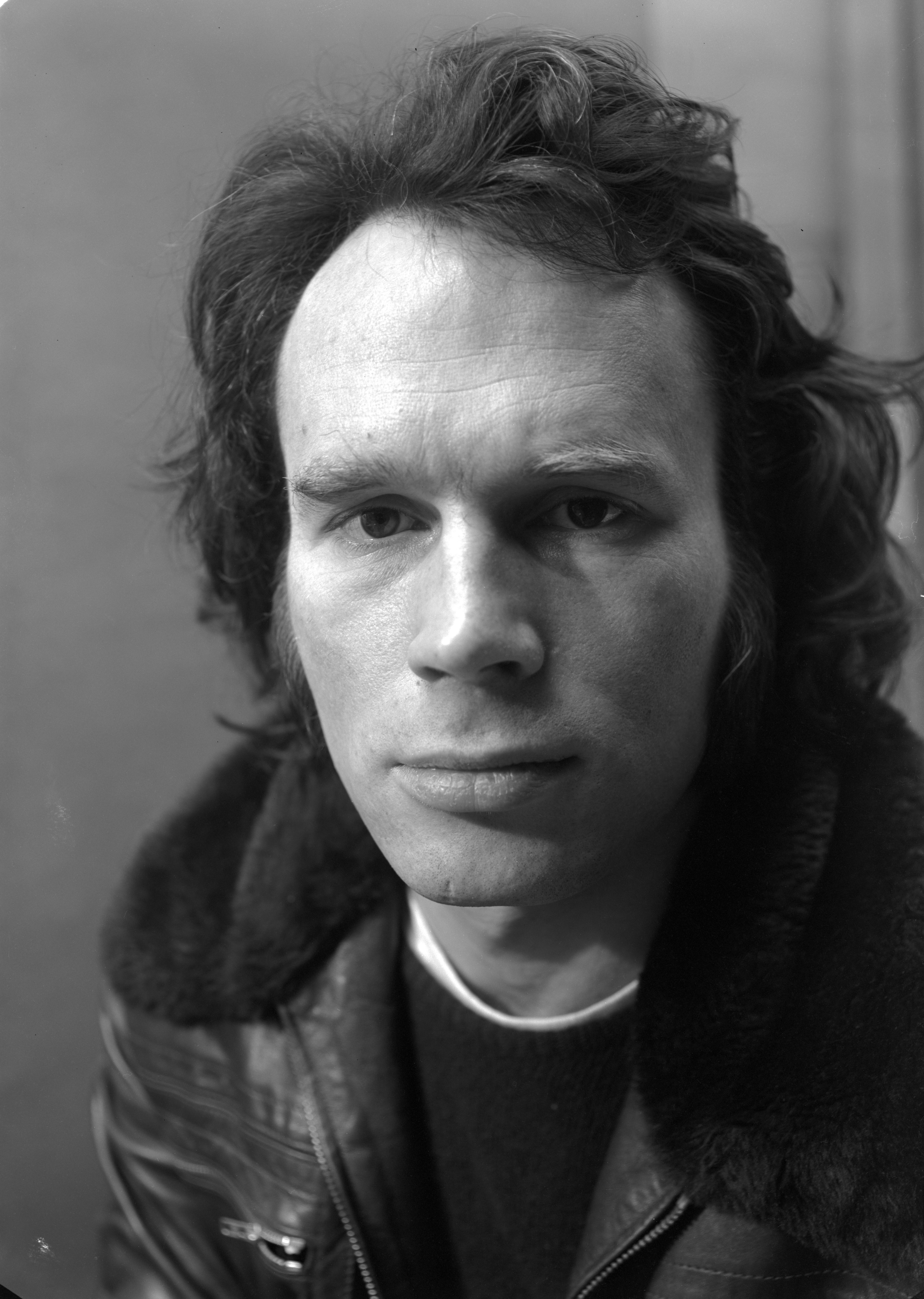
Brice Marden (CFA '61), important figure in Abstract Expressionism and Minimalism, member of American Academy of Arts and Letters, in 2020 an abstract painting, Complements, sold at Christie's for $30.9 million, eclipsing Rembrandt

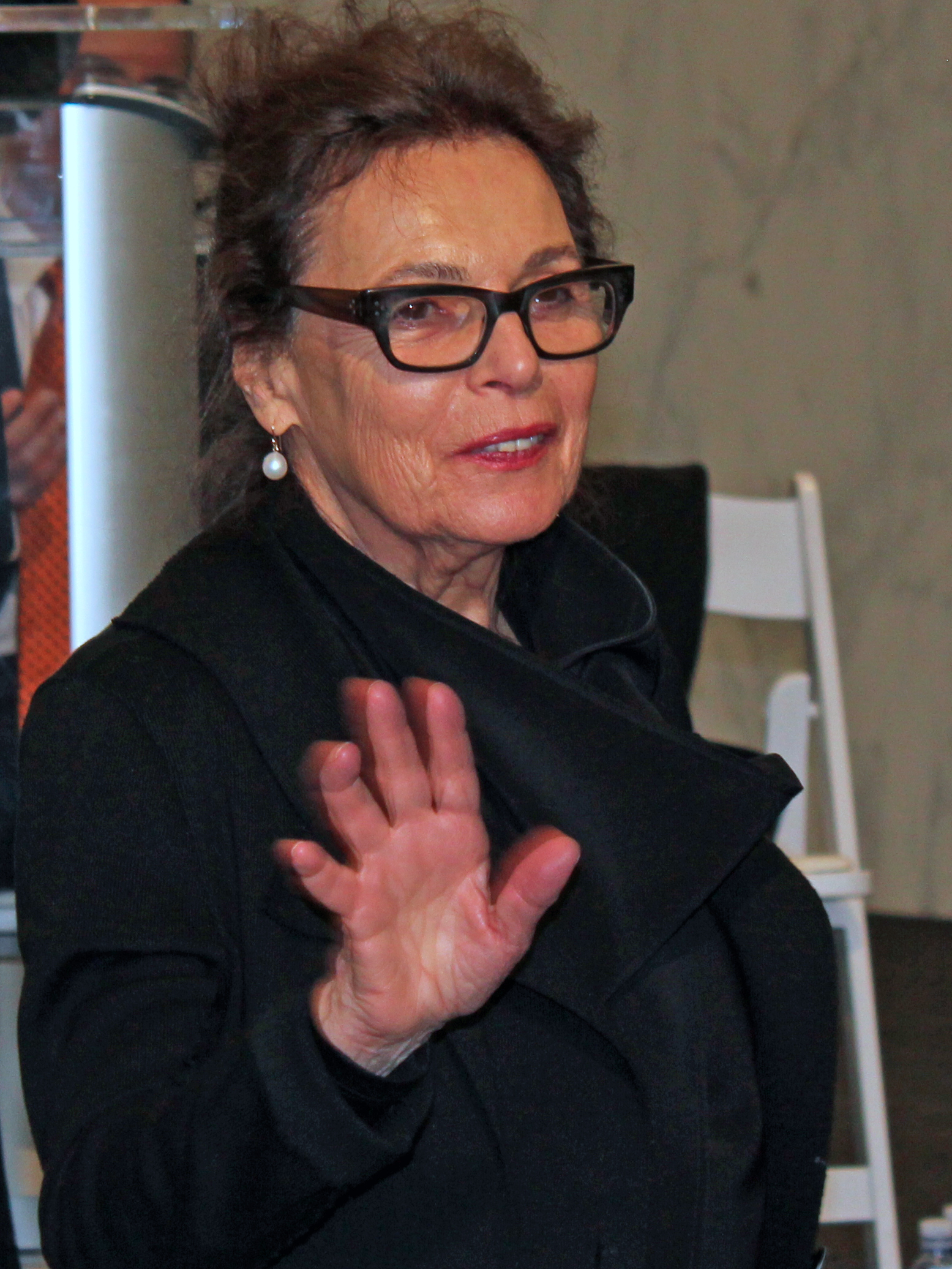
Pat Steir (CFA '60), painter and figure in Minimalism movement, Guggenheim Fellowship (1982), member of American Academy of Arts and Letters

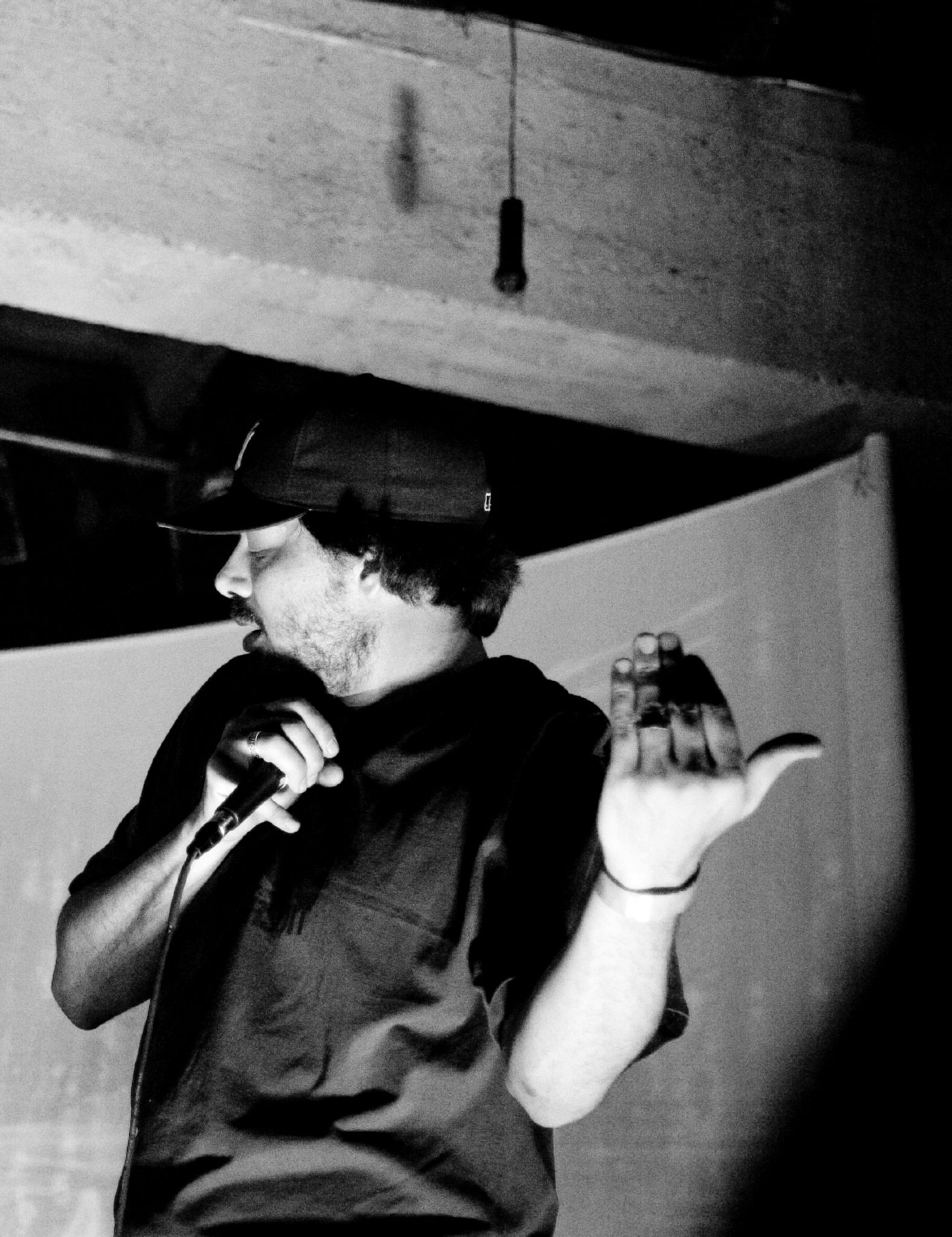
Aesop Rock (CFA '98), leading hip hop figure of underground and alternative hip hop acts that emerged during the late 1990s and early 2000s

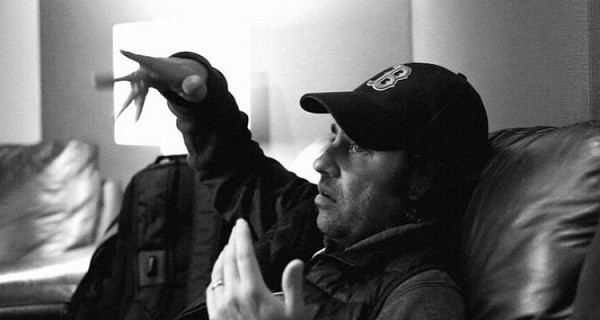
Matt Squire (CAS '99), platinum music producer for Ariana Grande, Demi Lovato, Selena Gomez, Kesha, One Direction

=== Art ===
- Bernard Berenson (CAS 1887*) – prominent art historian of the early 20th century and major figure in the attribution of Old Masters
- Franz Kline (CFA '35) – painter, important figure in Abstract Expressionism, part of the New York School with Pollock, de Kooning, Motherwell, a 1957 untitled painting sold at Christie's for $40.4 million
- Cyrus Dallin (CFA '37) – sculptor of iconic sculptures including Paul Revere, Appeal to the Great Spirit and Angel Maroni (honorary degree)
- Paul Caponigro (CFA '50) – two Guggenheim Fellowships, three grants from the NEA
- Calvin Burnett (CFA '60) – artist, exhibited extensively at the Smithsonian and Brooklyn Museum
- Pat Steir (CFA '60) – painter, Guggenheim Fellowship (1982), member of American Academy of Arts and Letters
- Arnold Glimcher (CFA '61) – founder of Pace Gallery, which sells more than $400 million in art annually
- Lorraine Shemesh (CFA '61) – artist, Abstract Expressionism, elected to the National Academy of Design
- Brice Marden (CFA '61) – painter, known for his paintings that fuse Abstract Expressionism and Minimalism, member of American Academy of Arts and Letters, in 2020 an abstract painting, Complements (2004–2007) sold at Christie's for $30.9 million, eclipsing old masters like Rembrandt
- Richard Yarde (CFA '62, '64) – artist and professor, specialized in watercolor painting
- Rick Meyerowitz (CFA '65) – illustrator, best known for National Lampoon cover-art, creator of poster for the comedy film Animal House
- Howardena Pindell (CFA '65) – artist, curator, activist, critic, and educator, MoMA curator 1977–1979, Guggenheim fellow 1987
- Jane Aaron (CFA '69) – illustrator, Guggenheim Fellowship (1985), Sesame Street, Between the Lions
- Mark Rosewater (COM '69) – head designer for Magic: The Gathering, the first trading card game (2003–present)
- Jon Imber (CFA '77) – painter, important figure in Boston Expressionism
- Andrew Raftery (CFA '84) – painter, Guggenheim Fellowship (2008)
- Alexi Worth (CFA '93) – painter, Guggenheim Fellowship (2009)
- Jennifer Guidi (CFA '94) – painter, in collections of the Hammer Museum, Guggenheim Museum, and Marciano Art Foundation
- Sedrick Huckaby (CFA '97) – artist, Guggenheim Fellowship (2008)
- Robert T. Freeman (CFA '97) – painter, member of the Boston Arts Commission
- Lizet Benrey – painter
- Ida Lorentzen – American-born Norwegian artist

=== Music ===
- Miriam Gideon (CAS '26) – composer, first woman to write a complete synagogue service, among most recorded female composers of her era, second woman inducted into American Academy and Institute of Arts and Letters in 1975
- Samuel Adler (CFA '48) – composer, American Classical Music Hall of Fame, founder and conductor of the Seventh Army Symphony Orchestra, member of the American Academy of Arts and Letters
- George Wein (CAS '50) – Grammy Award-winning jazz musician, promoter, founder of the Newport Jazz Festival, the Newport Folk Festival, and the New Orleans Jazz & Heritage Festival
- Don Ellis (CFA '56) – trumpeter, jazz composer
- Joan Baez (CFA 1958*) – folk singer, Grammy's Lifetime Achievement Award (2007), one of Rolling Stone' 200 Greatest Singers of All Time
- James Billings (CFA '57) – operatic baritone, opera librettist, opera director, member of the New York City Opera
- Alan Wilson (CFA '64*) – co-founder, leader, co-lead singer, and primary composer of the blues band Canned Heat, known for hits "On the Road Again" and "Going Up the Country"
- Doug Yule (CFA 1966*) – musician, member of the Velvet Underground (1968–1973), ranked number 19 on Rolling Stone's list of the "100 Greatest Artists of All Time" (2004), Rock and Roll Hall of Fame inductee
- Anthony & Joseph Paratore (CFA '66; CFA '70) – piano duo
- Norman Greenbaum (CFA '67*) – musician, "Spirit in the Sky", amongst best-selling one hit-wonders of all time
- Kate Pierson (COM '70) – singer, lyricist, and founding member of the B-52's
- Jeff Baxter (CAS '71*) – guitarist, Steely Dan, Doobie Brothers, Spirit; Rock and Roll Hall of Fame
- James Montgomery (CAS '71) – blues musician, the James Montgomery Blues Band
- David de Berry (CFA '76) – theater composer, known for 1987 score of Charles Dickens's A Christmas Carol
- Anthony Tommasini (CFA '82) – chief classical music critic for The New York Times (2000–2021)
- Mwalim (CAS '91, COM '93) – composer, pianist, conductor, singer, playwright, director, actor
- Mary Timony (CAS '92) – indie rock musician
- Joan Wasser (CFA '92) – indie rock musician
- Paula Kelley (CAS '93) – indie pop singer-songwriter
- Justine Susanna Gamache (CFA '94, CFA '99) – indie synth-pop musician, lead singer of Freezepop
- Valerie Coleman (CFA '95) – composer, named "one of the Top 35 Women Composers" by The Washington Post
- PSY (QST 1996*) – Korean rapper best known for "Gangnam Style"
- Noah Lennox (STH 1997*) – experimental musician, founding member of Animal Collective
- Brian Fair (CAS '97) – Grammy Award-nominated lead vocalist of Shadows Fall
- Aesop Rock (CFA '98) – hip hop musician
- Matt Squire (CAS '99) – platinum music producer for Ariana Grande, Demi Lovato, Selena Gomez, Kesha, One Direction
- Morris Robinson (CFA '01) – opera singer, first African-American artist to sign with a major classical record label
- Alexandra Fol (CFA '02) – Canadian composer
- Edwin Barker – principal double bass, Boston Symphony Orchestra
- William Waterhouse – violinist, Boston Symphony Orchestra (1975–1987), principal 2nd violin, Boston Pops
- Eugene Izotov – principal oboe, Chicago Symphony Orchestra
- Lan Shui – music director, Singapore Symphony Orchestra
- David Daniels – music director, Warren Symphony Orchestra (Michigan) 1974–2010

=== Popular culture ===
- Carolyn Bessette-Kennedy (WED '88) – socialite, publicist, wife of John F. Kennedy Jr.
- Jenna Marbles (WED '10) – the most popular female personality on YouTube, with 1.8 billion video views and 20 million subscribers
- Judy Smith (COM '80) – crisis manager who inspired Scandal's Olivia Pope, played by Kerry Washington
- Elizabeth (Sadie) Holloway Marston (LAW '88) – co-creator of the comic book character Wonder Woman
- Olivia Culpo – Miss USA 2012 from Rhode Island, Miss Universe 2012
- Olivia Jordan – Miss World United States 2013, Top 20 at Miss World 2013. She is also Miss USA 2015 representing Oklahoma
- Frank Reed Horton (LAW '17) – founder and first national president of Alpha Phi Omega, the largest collegiate fraternity in the US
- Wavy Gravy (CFA '61*) – entertainer, peace activist, best known for his role at Woodstock
- Joyce Jillson (CFA '67) – official astrologer for Twentieth Century Fox Studios, suggesting astrologically favorable dates for film openings, including Star Wars on May 25, 1977

== Business ==
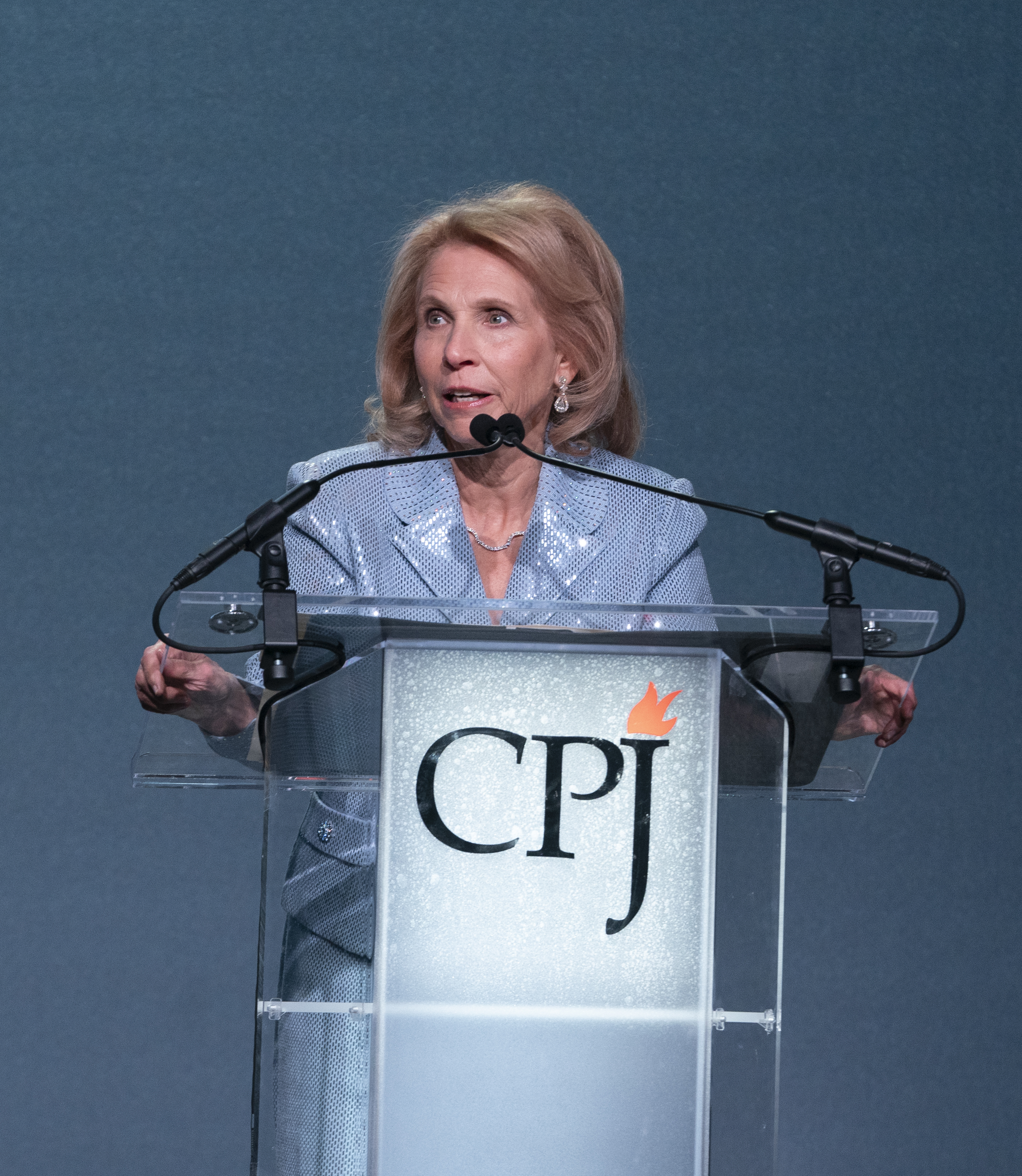
Shari Redstone (LAW '80), president of National Amusements, which owns CBS, Comedy Central, BET, Showtime Networks, Nickelodeon, MTV and Paramount Pictures

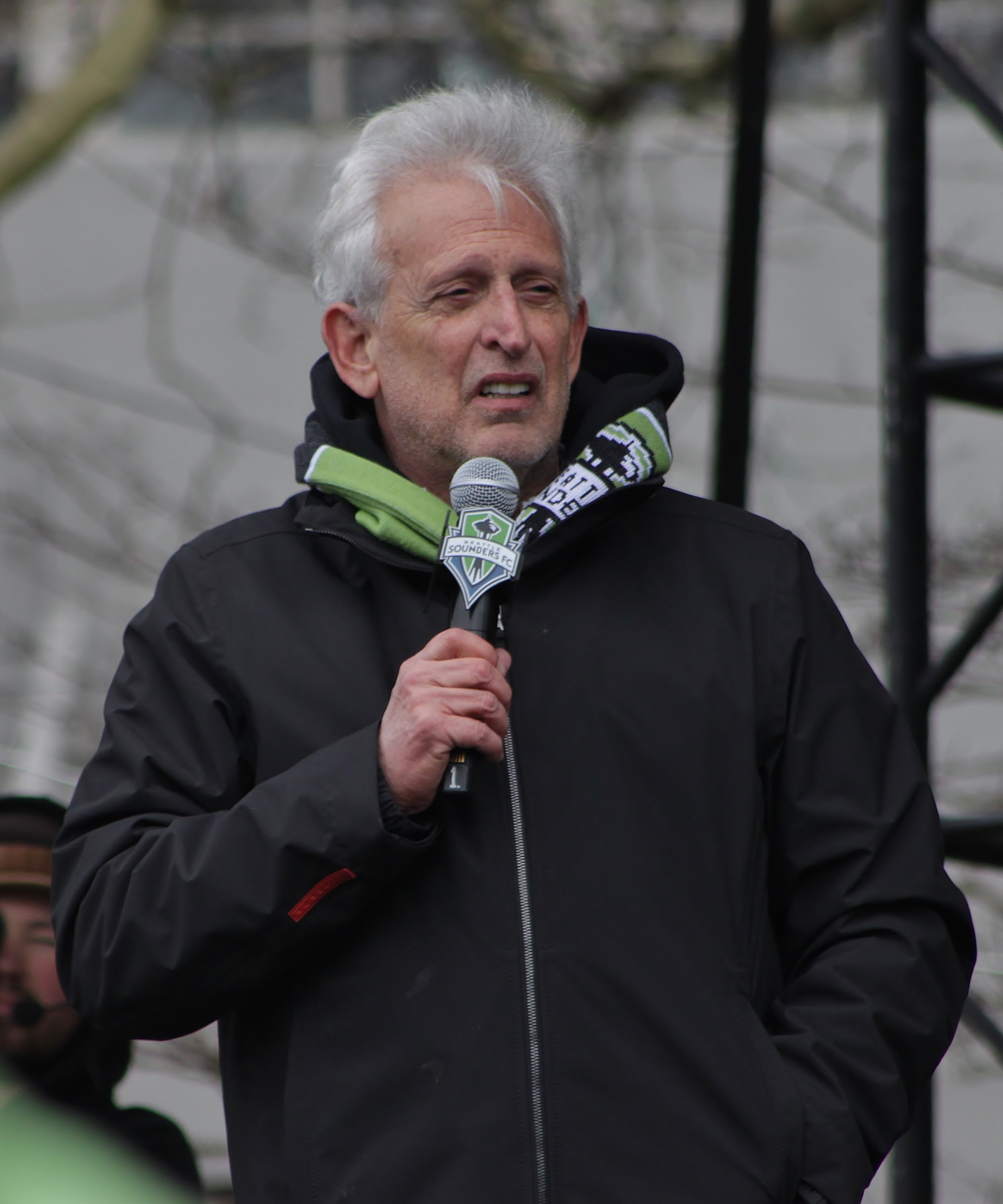
Joe Roth (COM '71), chairman, Walt Disney Studios; chairman, 20th Century Fox; founder of major film studio Morgan Creek Entertainment

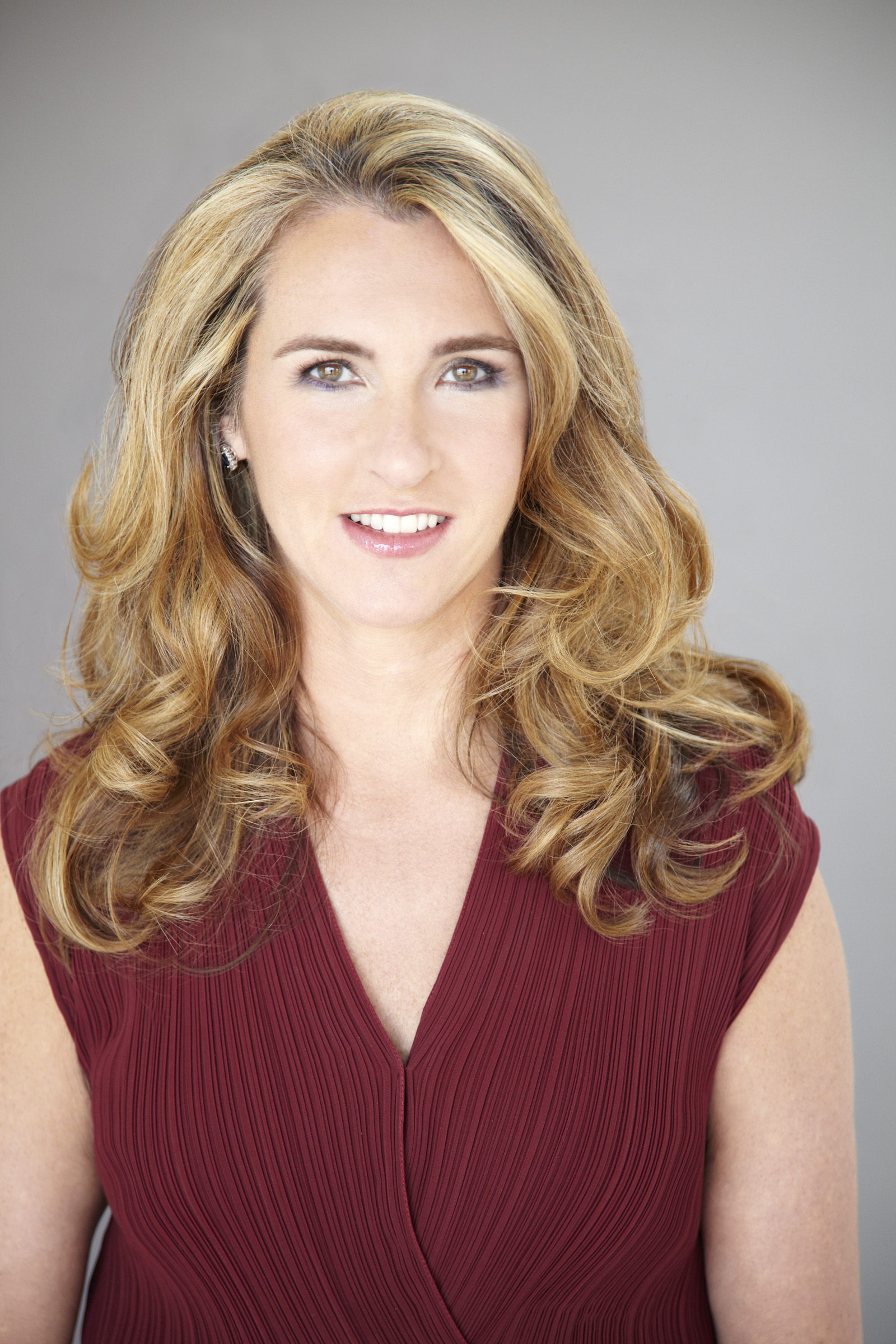
Nancy Dubuc (COM '91), CEO, Vice Media, CEO and president, A+E Networks

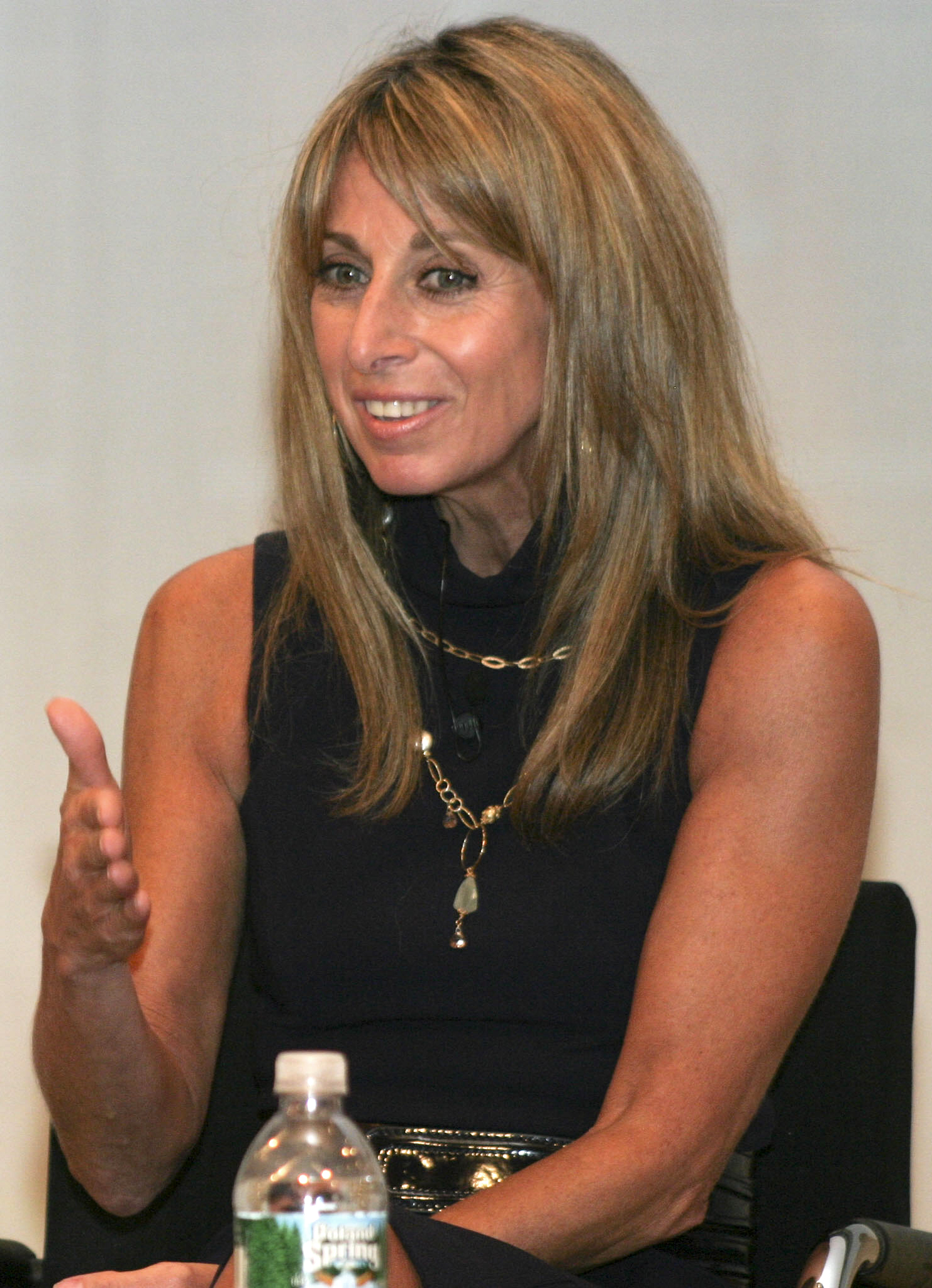
Bonnie Hammer (COM '71, WED '75), vice-chairman, NBCUniversal

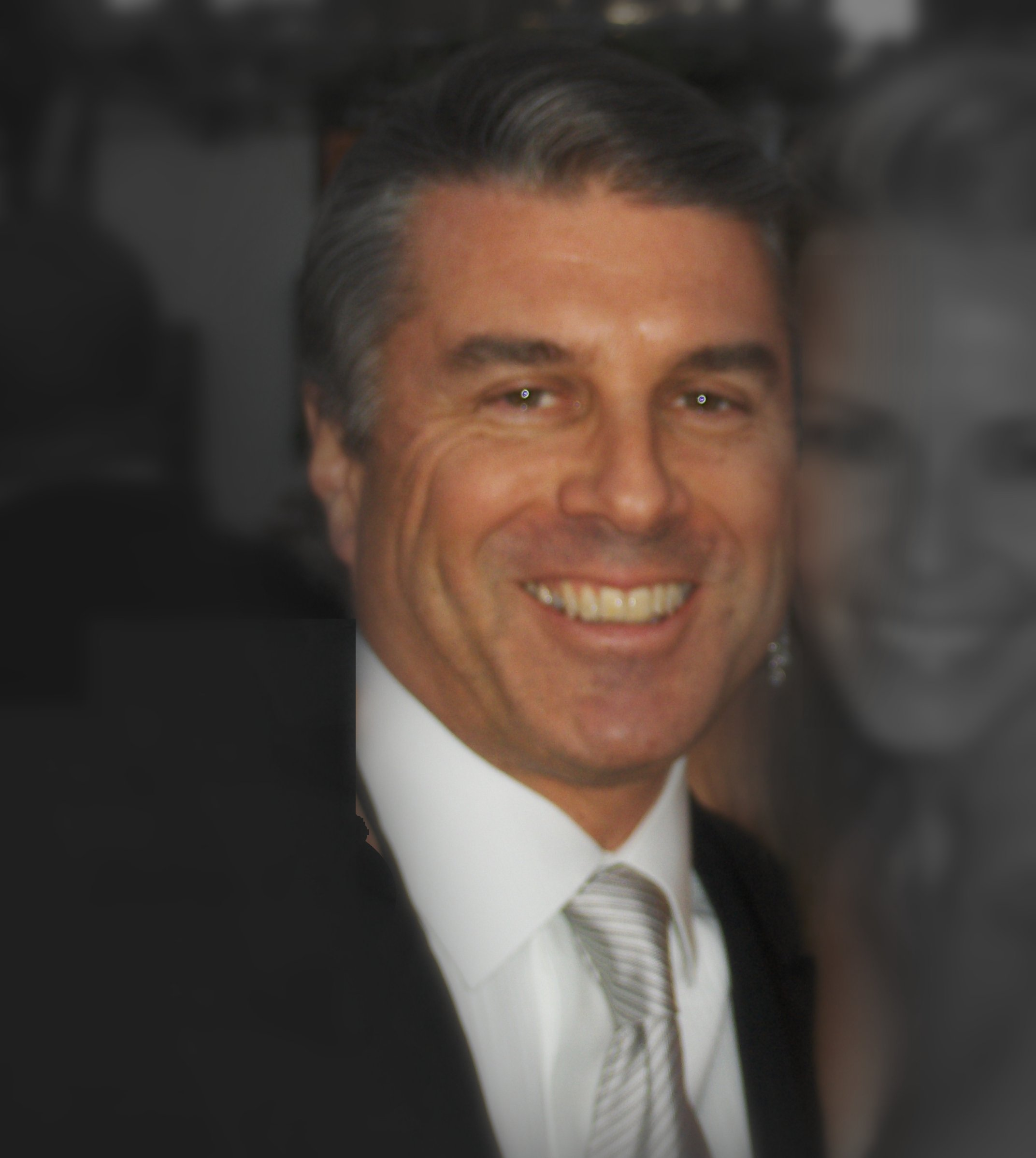
Ted Harbert (COM '77), chairman, NBC Broadcasting, president and CEO of the Comcast Entertainment Group, and chairman of ABC Entertainment

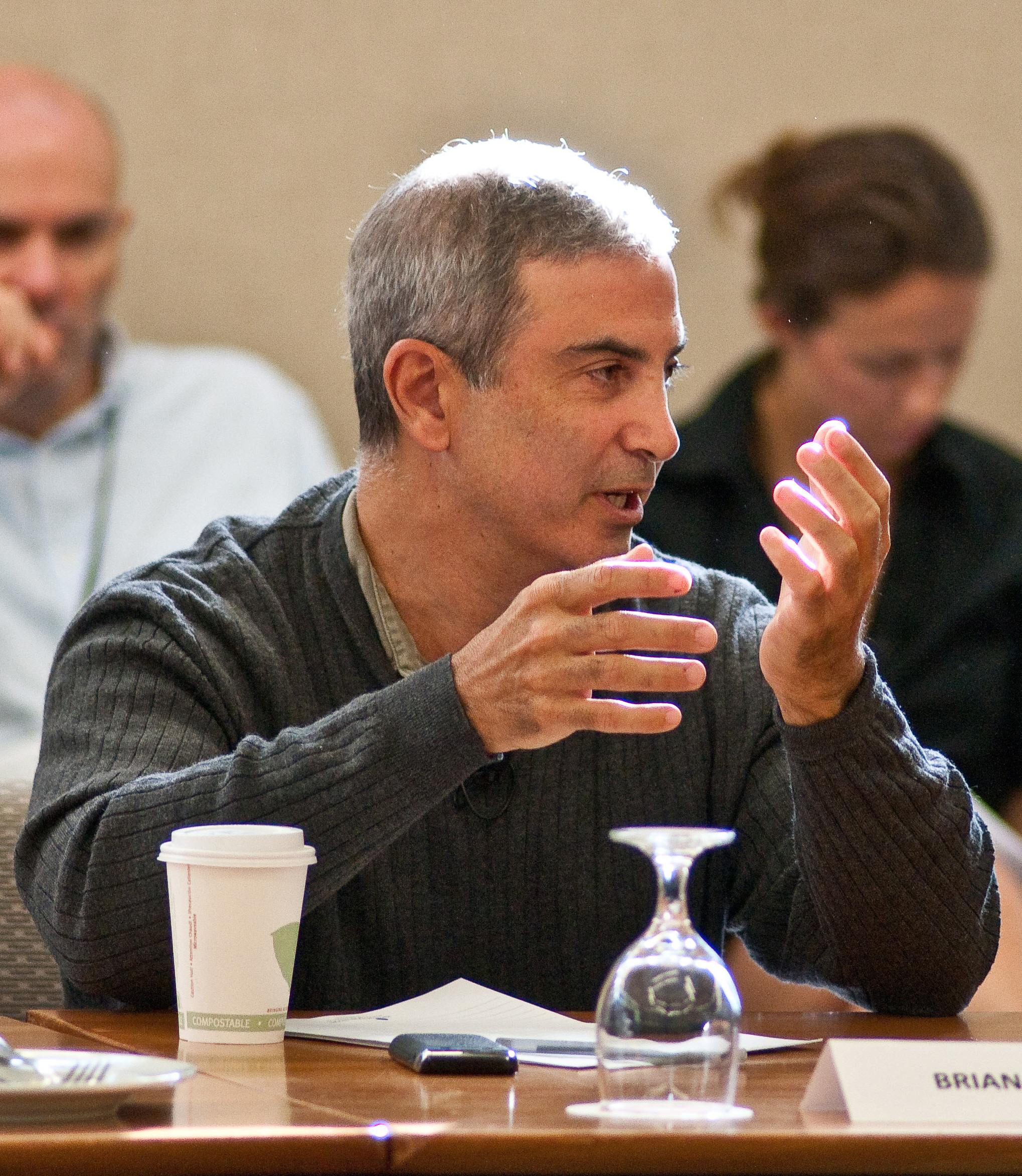
Brian Bedol (COM '80) – creator of ESPN Classic, which became ESPN; founder and CEO, CBS Sports Network
- Allen Questrom (QST '64) – CEO of Macy's, Neiman Marcus, Barneys New York, and JCPenney
- Karen S. Lynch (QST '99) – CEO, CVS Health
- Reshma Kewalramani (CAS '75, MED '78) – president and CEO, Vertex Pharmaceuticals
- Christine Poon (QST '83) – chairman, Johnson & Johnson
- John F. Smith Jr. (QST '65) – chairman and CEO of General Motors
- David Zaslav (LAW '85) – CEO and president, Warner Bros., oversaw merger of Discovery and WarnerMedia
- Joe Roth (COM '71) – chairman, Walt Disney Studios (1994–2000); chairman, 20th Century Fox (1989–1993), Caravan Pictures (1993–1994), and founder of major American film studio, Morgan Creek Entertainment
- Nina Tassler (CFA '79) – chairman, CBS
- Brian Bedol (COM '80) – creator of ESPN Classic, founder and CEO, CBS Sports Network
- Shari Redstone (LAW '80) – vice chairman, Viacom and CBS, Time's list of the 100 most influential people in the world, and Forbes' list of the World's 100 Most Powerful Women
- Bonnie Hammer (COM '71, WED '75) – chairman, NBCUniversal
- Ted Harbert (COM '77) – chairman, NBC Broadcasting, president and CEO of the Comcast Entertainment Group, and Chairman of ABC Entertainment
- Luca Maestri (QST '91) – CFO, Apple
- Tom Szkutak (QST '82) – CFO, Amazon
- Edward Zander (QST '75) – chairman and CEO, Motorola, president of Sun Microsystems
- Dirk Meyer (QST '93) – CEO, Advanced Micro Devices
- Warren Albert (CAS '42) – president, Warren Equities, one of the 500 largest privately owned companies; Brown University's Warren Alpert Medical School is named after him
- Nancy Dubuc (COM '91) – CEO, Vice Media, CEO and president, A+E Networks
- Steve Broidy (CFA '27*) – president, Monogram Pictures, 1962 Jean Hersholt Humanitarian Award from the Academy of Motion Picture Arts and Sciences, founding chairman of Cedars-Sinai Medical Center
- Jim Brett (QST '91) – CEO, J.Crew, CEO, West-Elm
- Mickey Drexler (QST '68) – CEO, J. Crew
- J Allard (CAS '91) – VP, Microsoft, known for developing the Xbox product family
- Jerald G. Fishman (QST) – CEO, Analog Devices
- Paul Irwin – CEO, Humane Society
- Ken Lin (CAS '98) – founder and CEO, Credit Karma
- Jan Brandt – former CMO of AOL and vice chair emeritus of America Online/Time Warner
- Kamal Bahamdan (ENG '94) – Saudi Arabian businessman, CEO, Safanad and five-time Olympic equestrian
- Alessandro Benetton (QST '88) – chairman of 21 Investimenti S.p. A, deputy chairman of Benetton Group
- Rocco Benetton (QST chief executive) – Benetton Formula One Team
- Edgar J. Helms (STH 1889*) – founder, Goodwill Industries
- Marcela Sapone (QST '08, UNI '08) – founder and CEO, Hello Alfred
- Stephanie McMahon (COM '98) – EVP, chief brand officer, WWE, member of the McMahon family, owners of WWE
- Shane McMahon (COM '93) – EVP, WWE, member of the McMahon family, owners of WWE
- John Couris – CEO, Tampa General Hospital 2017
- Tania Ortiz Mena – president, Sempra Infrastructure; former CEO, IEnova

== Film, television, and theatre ==
=== Film and television ===
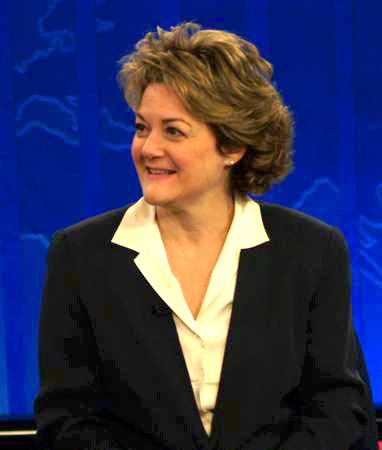
Bonnie Arnold (COM '78), prominent figure in initial wave of computer-animation, Academy Award-nominated producer of Toy Story (1995), Tarzan (1999), How to Train Your Dragon series

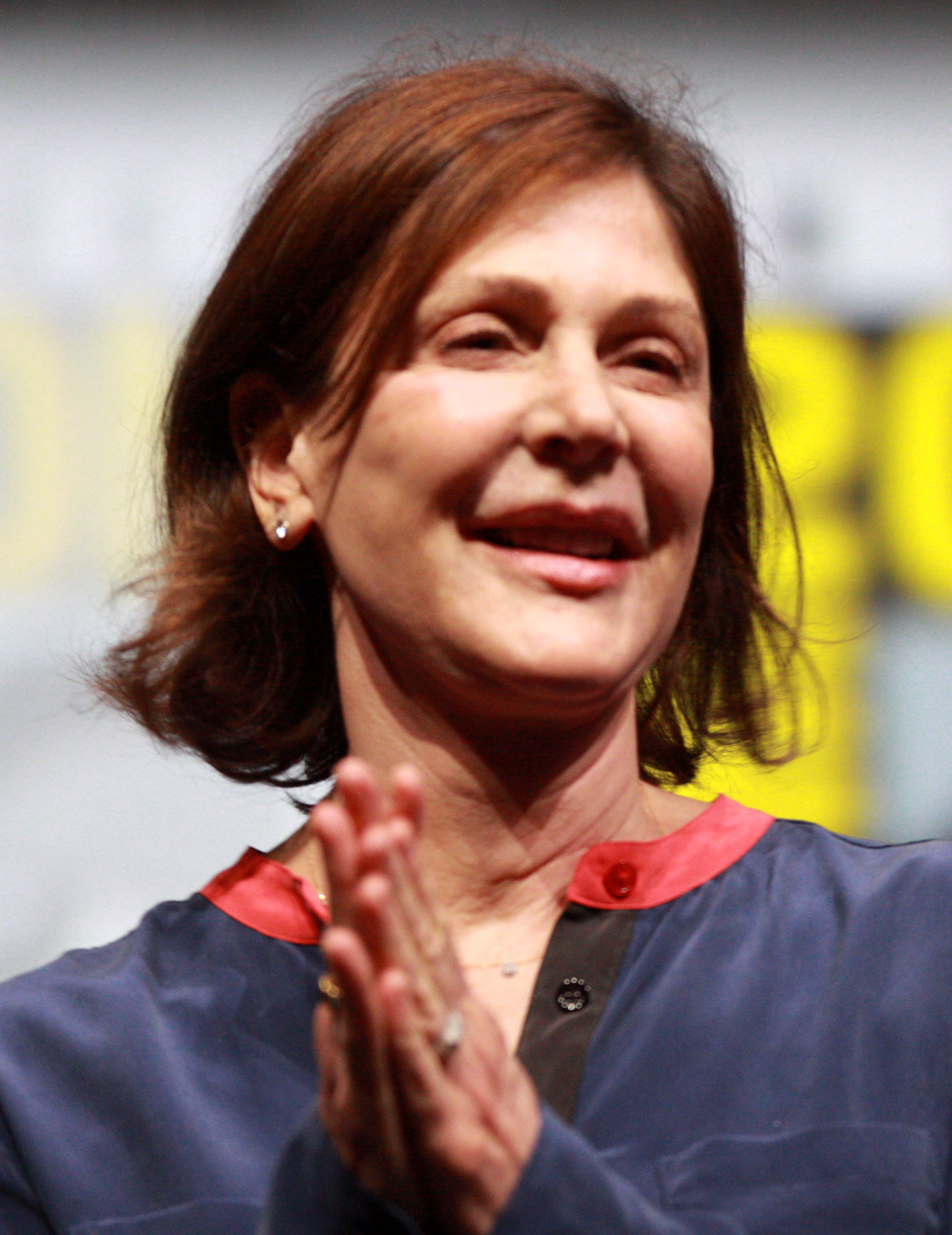
Lauren Shuler Donner (COM '71), X-Men film series franchise producer whose films have grossed $5.5 billion

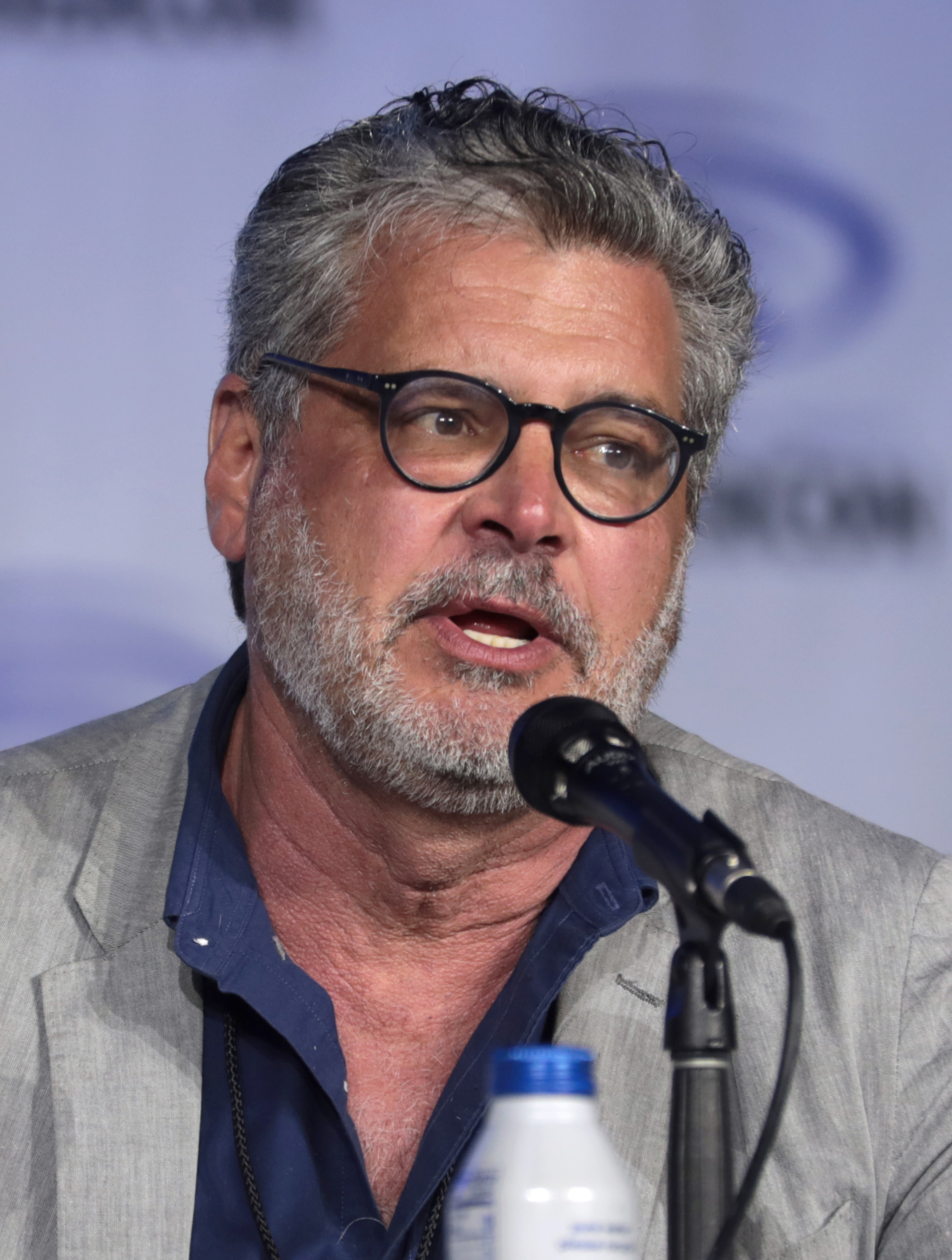
Michael Williams (COM '79), Academy Award and Emmy Award-winning producer of Queer Eye for the Straight Guy and Queer Eye

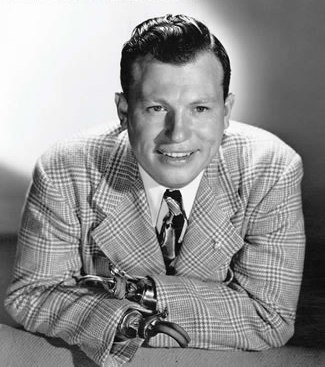
Harold Russell (QST '49), Academy Award-winning actor for The Best Years of Our Lives (1964), the first non-professional actor to win an Oscar for acting

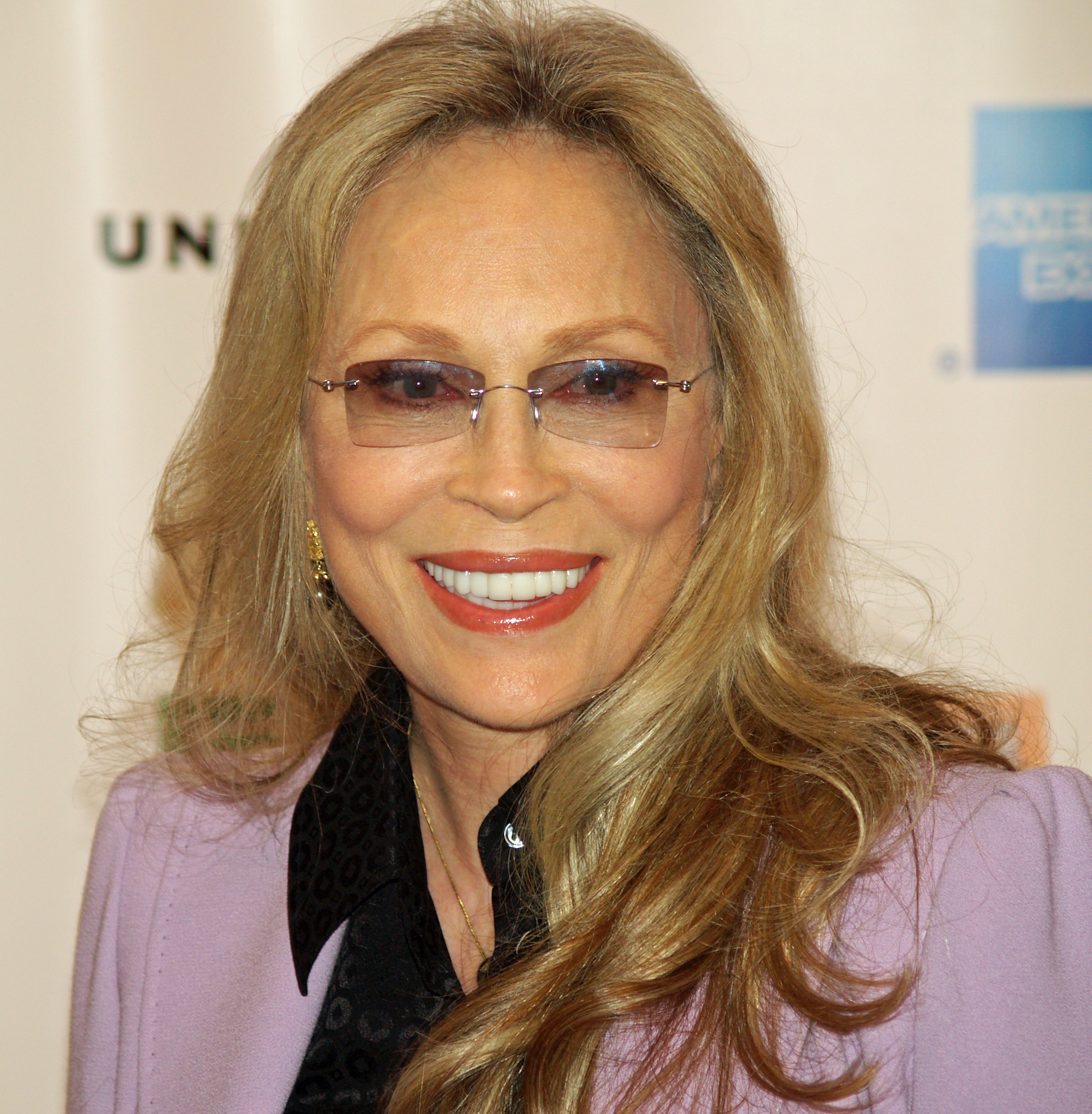
Faye Dunaway (CFA '62), Academy Award-winning actress, Bonnie and Clyde (1967), Network (1976), Chinatown (1974), a powerful emblem of New Hollywood

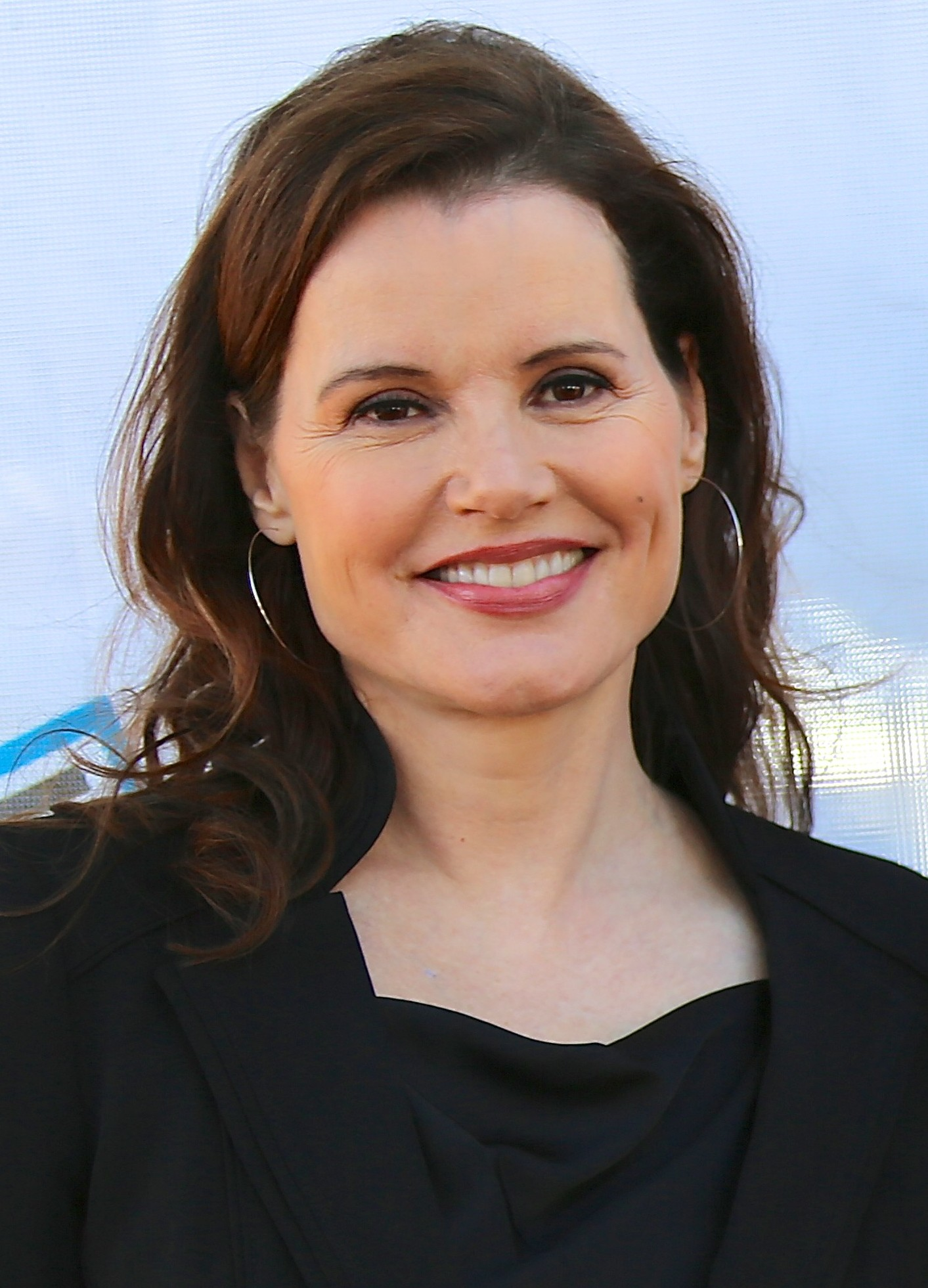
Geena Davis (CFA '79), Academy Award-winning actress, The Accidental Tourist (1989), Thelma & Louise (1992), Beetlejuice (1988), A League of Their Own (1992)

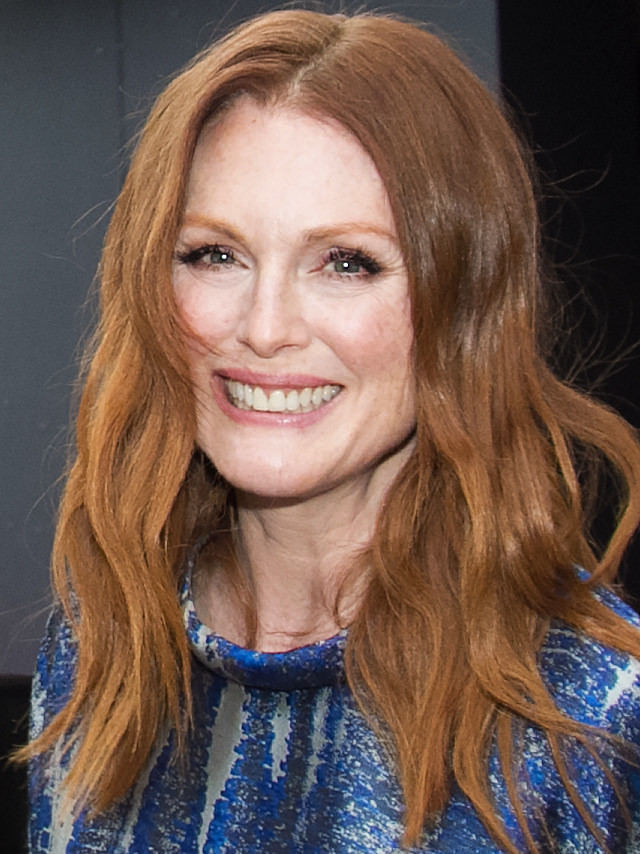
Julianne Moore (CFA '83) – Academy Award-winning actress, ranked 11th on The New York Times best actors of the 21st century, named to Time's 100 (2015)

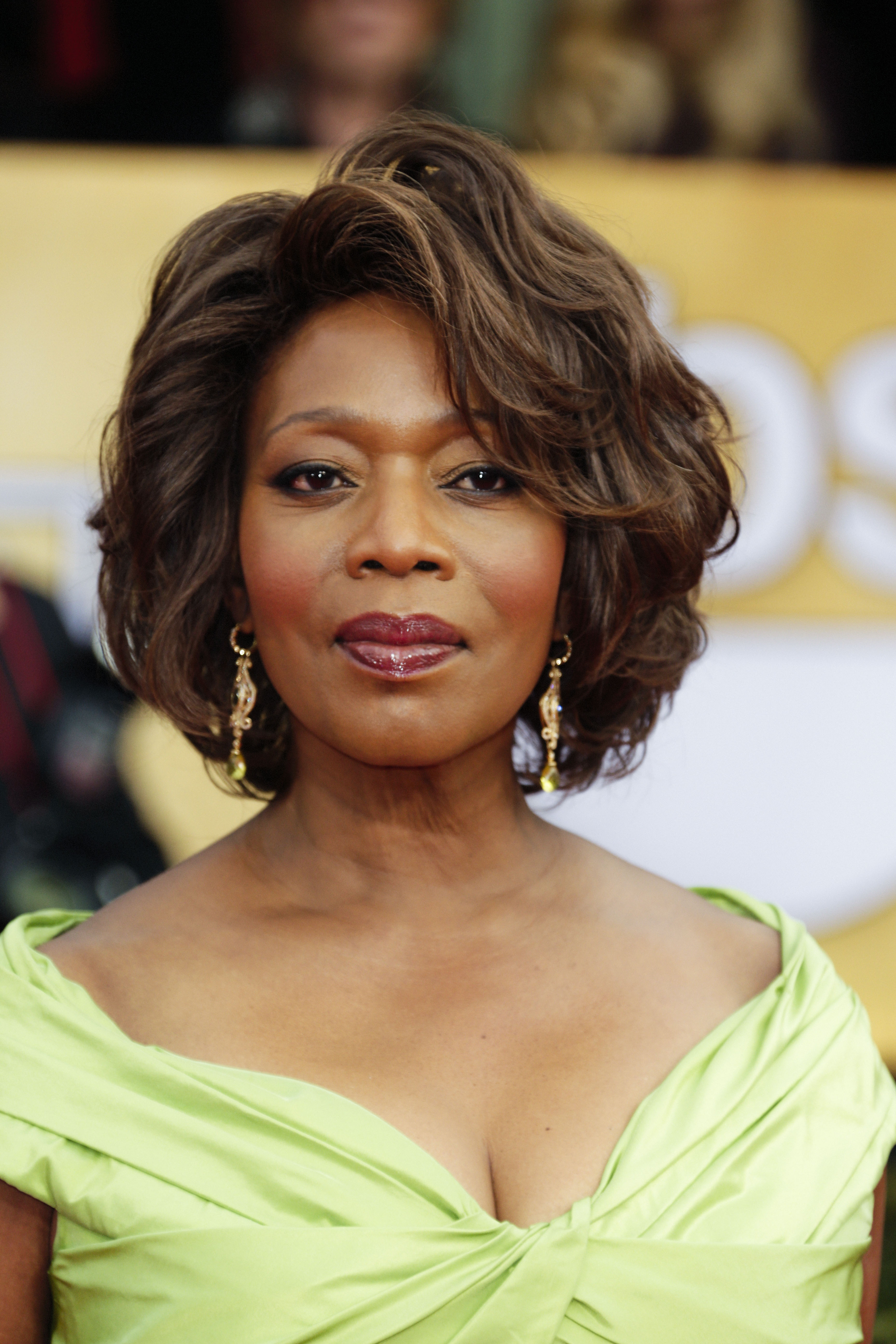
Alfre Woodard (CFA '74) – Emmy Award-winning actress, ranked 17th on The New York Times best actors of the 21st century

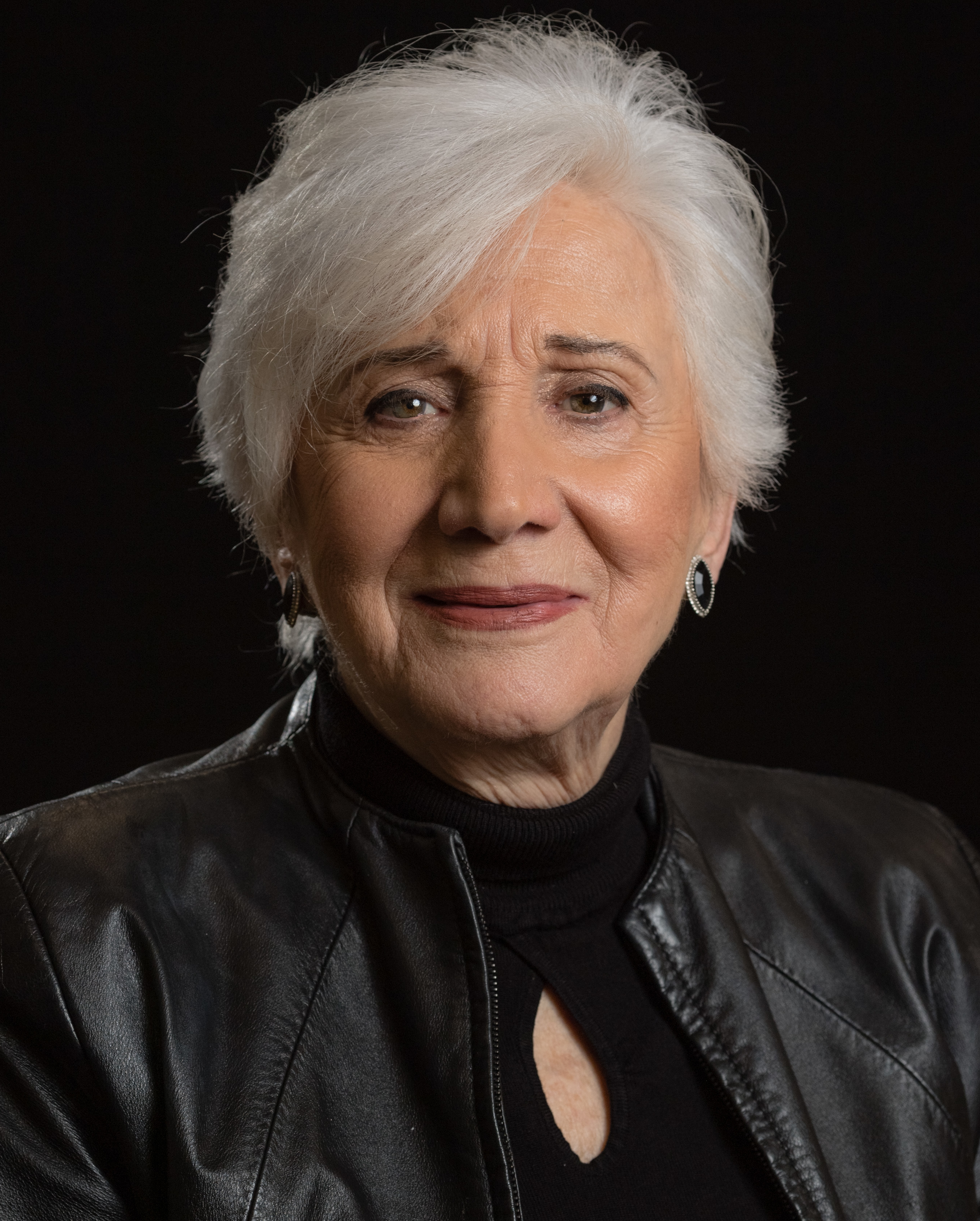
Olympia Dukakis (SAR '53, CFA '57), Academy Award-winning actress, Moonstruck (1987), Steel Magnolias (1989)

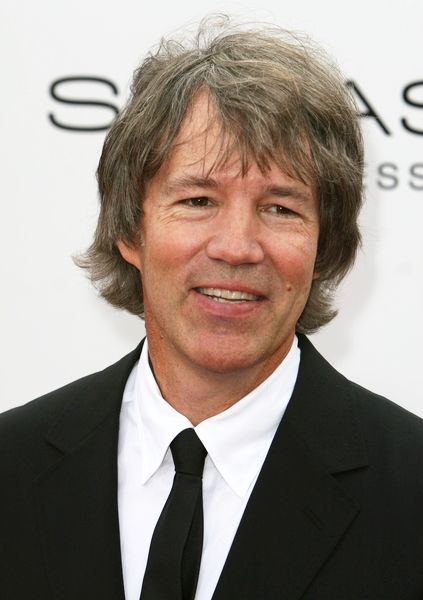
David E. Kelley (LAW '83), Peabody Award and Emmy Award-winning producer of L.A. Law, Picket Fences, The Practice, Ally McBeal, Chicago Hope, Big Little Lies, Boston Legal

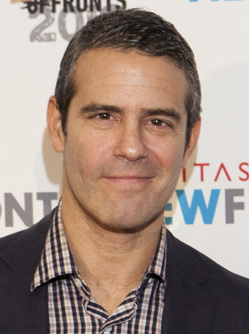
Andy Cohen (COM '90), Peabody Award and Emmy Award-winning host, executive producer of the Real Housewives franchise

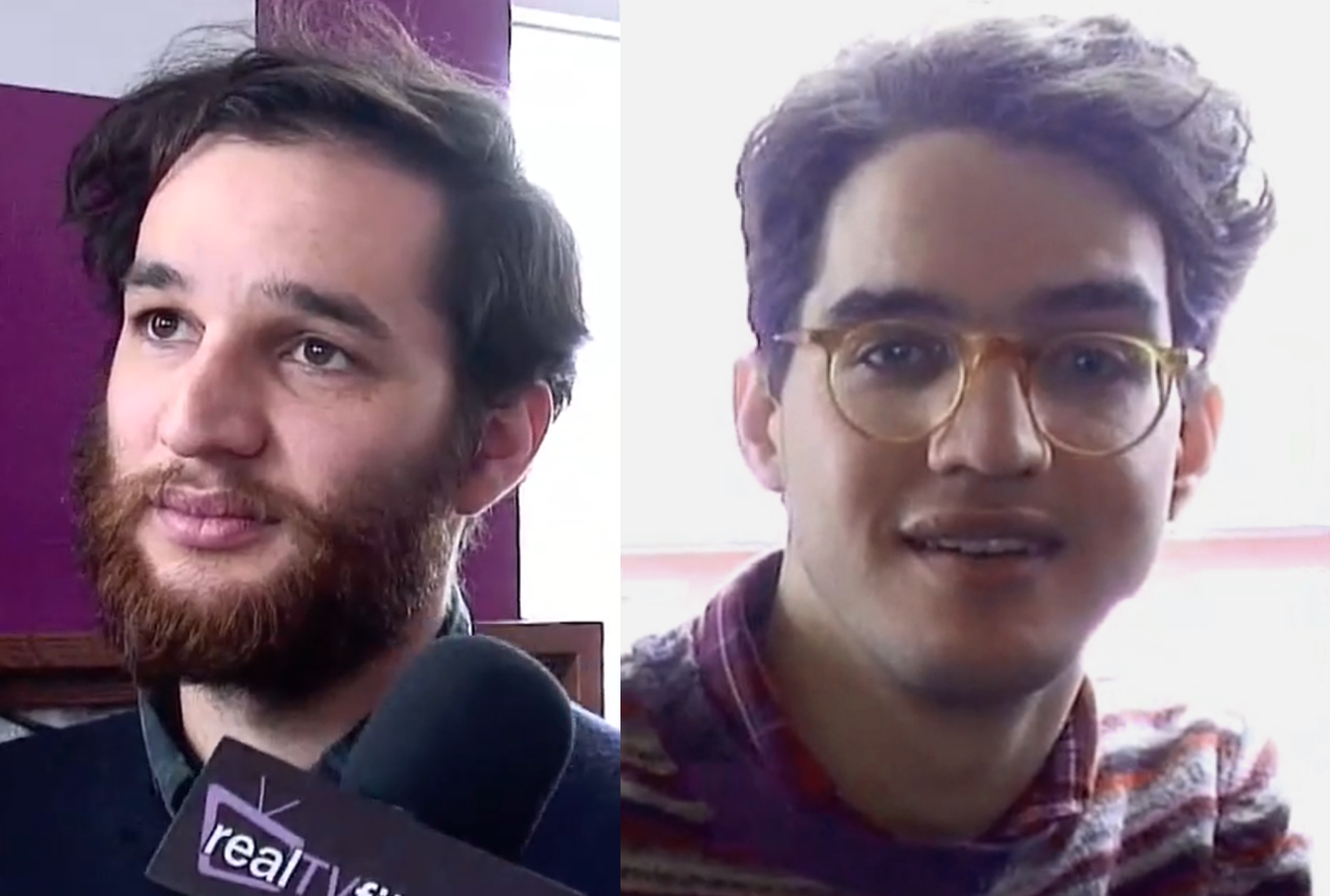
Safdie brothers (COM '08, '09) – co-directors of A24's Uncut Gems, Palme d'Or-nominee Good Time, Heaven Knows What, co-founders of Elara Pictures

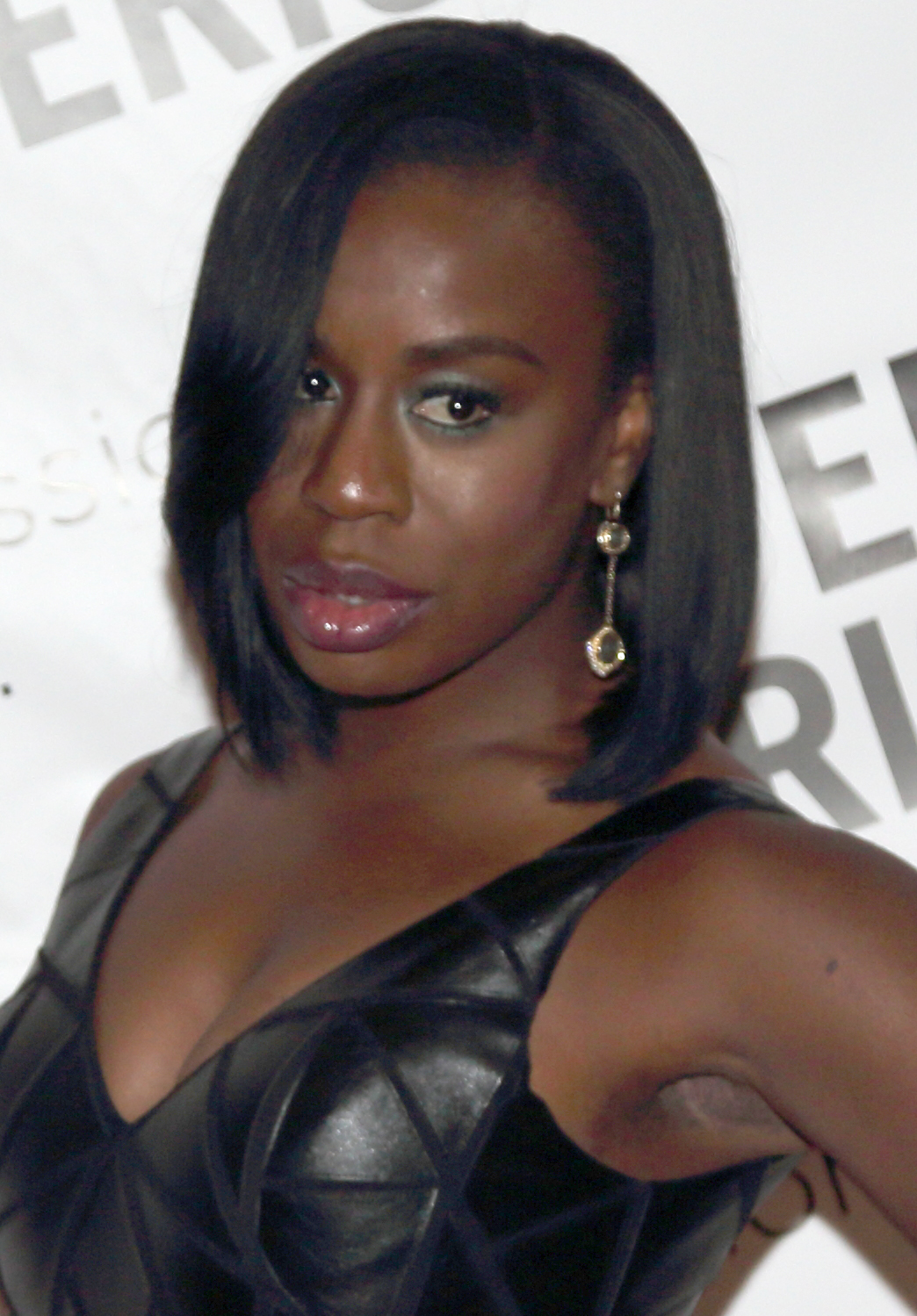
Uzo Aduba (CFA '05) – three-time Emmy Award-winning actress in Netflix's Orange Is the New Black and Hulu's Mrs. America

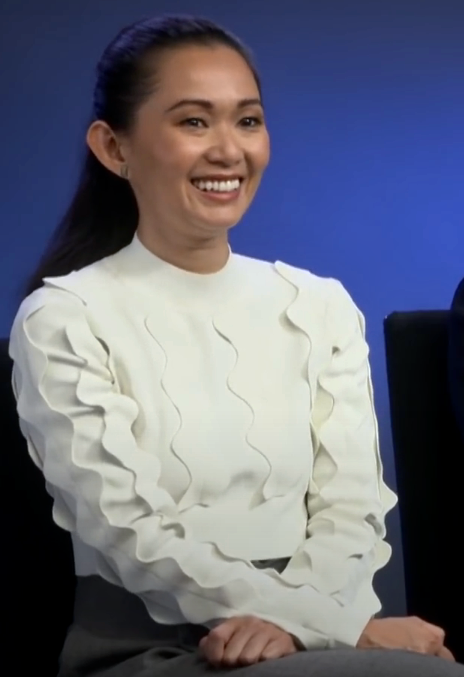
Hong Chau (COM '01) – Academy Award-nominated actress, The Whale, The Menu. Asteroid City, Showing Up, Downsizing

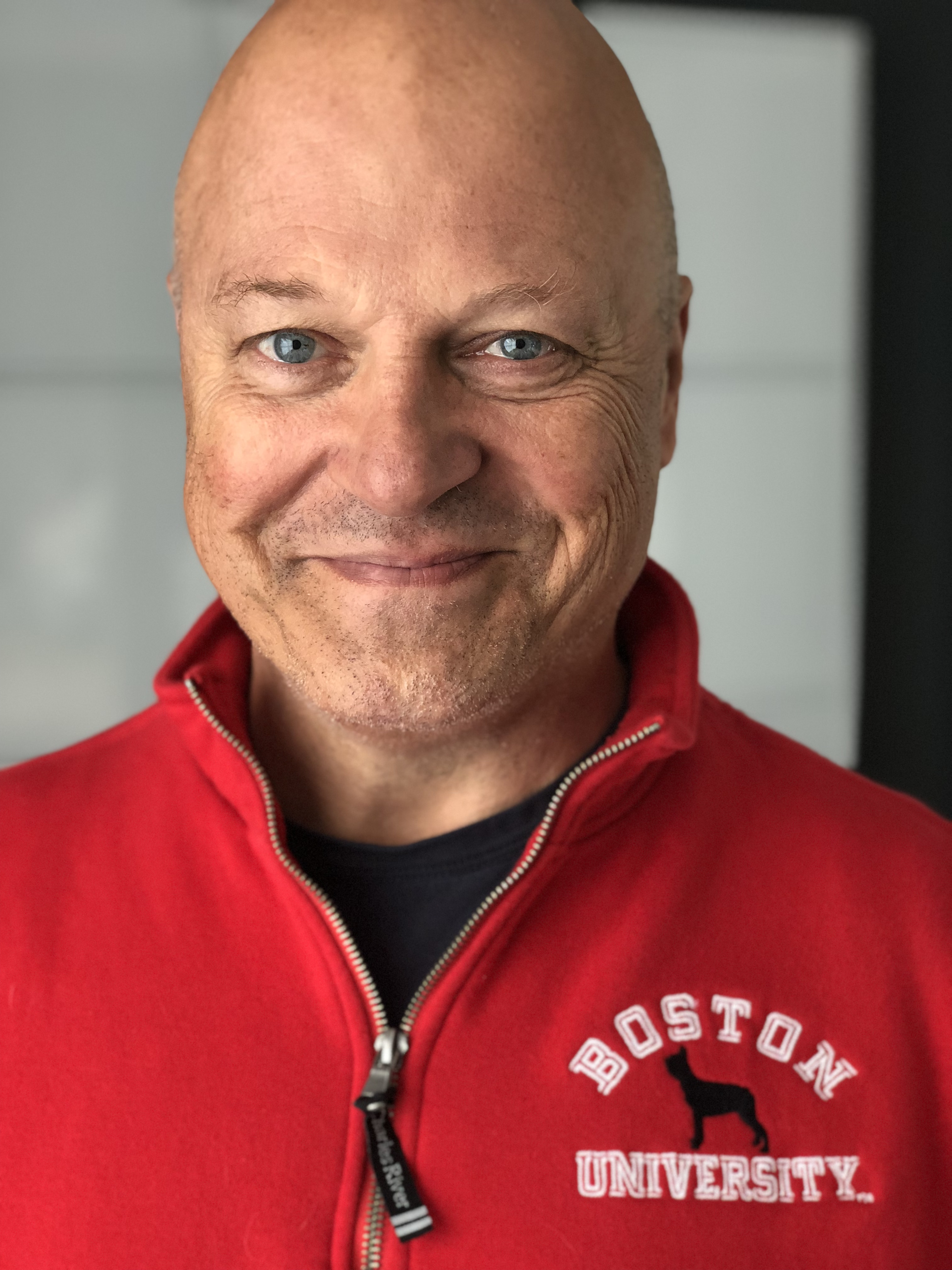
Michael Chiklis (CFA '86) – Emmy Award and Golden Globe Award-winning actor, FX's The Shield, The Thing in Fantastic Four films

List of notable alumni in the film and television industry listed by graduation year.

- Samuel Bischoff (CAS '22) – prolific Warner Bros. and RKO Studios producer of classical Hollywood cinema, producing over 400 full-length including The Roaring Twenties (1939), The Last Mile (1932), The Strangler (1964)
- Harold Russell (QST '49) – Academy Award-winning actor, Best Supporting Actor in The Best Years of Our Lives, the first non-professional actor to win an Oscar for acting, chairman of the President's Commission on Employment of the Handicapped
- Albert and David Maysles (CAS '51) – Emmy Award-winning documentarians, early pioneers of direct cinema genre, known for Salesman (1969), Gimme Shelter (1970) and Grey Gardens (1975), awarded 2013 National Medal of Arts by President Obama
- Olympia Dukakis (SAR '53, CFA '57) – Academy Award-winning actress, Best Supporting Actress in Moonstruck (1987), Steel Magnolias (1989), feature-length documentary about her life, Olympia (2018), cousin of U.S. Governor Michael Dukakis
- Russell Morash (CFA '57) – pioneer of lifestyle and how-to television, Emmy Award-winning director of The French Chef, starring Julia Child, This Old House, New Yankee Workshop
- Jean Firstenberg (COM '58) – president and CEO of the American Film Institute (1980–2007) and the only woman to serve in the role, awarded the AFI Life Achievement Award, member of the California State University Board of Trustees
- Jonathan Goldsmith (CFA '58) – actor, Mamma Mia!, face of Dos Equis, "The Most Interesting Man in the World"
- John Cazale (CFA '59) – actor, appeared in five films, all of which were nominated for the Academy Award for Best Picture and were selected for the U.S. National Film Registry in the Library of Congress: The Godfather (1972), The Conversation (1974), The Godfather Part II (1974), Dog Day Afternoon (1975), and The Deer Hunter (1978), husband of Meryl Streep
- Marian Morash (CFA '59) – television personality, on-air chef for Crocket's Victory Garden, author of The Victory Garden Cookbook
- Verna Bloom (CFA '59) – actress, Medium Cool and National Lampoon's Animal House
- Ed Bishop (CFA '60) – actor, UFO, Captain Blue in Captain Scarlet and the Mysterons, Fulbright Scholar
- Faye Dunaway (CFA '62) – Academy Award-winning actress, regarded as powerful emblem of New Hollywood
- Göksel Kortay (CFA '62) – actress, voice actress, translator, and lecturer
- Tobin Bell (CFA '64) – actor, icon of horror genre, John Kramer / Jigsaw in the Saw franchise, starring in eight of Saw (2004) sequels
- Stanley Kamel (CFA '65) – actor, best known for playing Dr. Charles Kroger on Monk (2002–2008)
- Lenny Baker (CFA '66) – Tony Award-winning and Golden Globe-nominated actor in Next Stop, Greenwich Village (1976) and I Love My Wife (1977)
- Paul Michael Glaser (CFA '67) – actor, ABC series Starsky & Hutch
- Trish Vradenburg (CAS '68) – screenwriter, philanthropist, Designing Women, Kate and Allie, Family Ties
- Will Lyman (CFA '71) – Peabody Award-winning narrator of PBS series Frontline (1984–present)
- Lauren Shuler Donner (COM '71) – X-Men film series franchise producer, films have grossed around $5.5 billion
- Robin Bartlett (CFA '73) – actress, NBC's The Powers That Be and Mad About You, recurring on American Horror Story
- Alfre Woodard (CFA '74) – Academy Award-nominated and Emmy Award-winning actress, Best Supporting Actress for Cross Creek (1983), "The 25 Greatest Actors of the 21st Century" by The New York Times, board member of Academy of Motion Picture Arts and Sciences
- Paul Reubens (CFA '74*) – Emmy Award-winning actor, creating and portraying the character Pee-wee Herman in The Pee-wee Herman Show and Pee-wee's Playhouse, ranked in TV Guide's 'Top 10 Cult Shows Ever'
- David Garrison (CFA '74) – Tony Award-nominated actor, Al Bundy's neighbor on Married... with Children
- Bruce Feirstein (COM '75) – screenwriter of three James Bond films GoldenEye, Tomorrow Never Dies, The World Is Not Enough
- Rick Heinrichs (CFA '76) – Academy Award-winning production designer, Best Production Design for Sleepy Hollow
- Reed Birney (COM '76*) – Tony Award-winning actor, Mass (2021), The Menu (2022), recurring roles in Gossip Girl, House of Cards
- Ethan Phillips (CAS '77) – actor, playwright, Neelix on Star Trek: Voyager, Pete Downey on Benson
- Bonnie Arnold (COM '78) – prominent figure in initial wave of computer-animation, producer of Toy Story, Tarzan, How to Train Your Dragon
- Geena Davis (CFA '79) – Academy Award-winning actress, Best Supporting Actress in The Accidental Tourist(1989), Best Actress nominee for Thelma & Louise (1992), starred in Beetlejuice, A League of Their Own, awarded honorary Oscar Jean Hersholt Humanitarian Award for those "whose humanitarian efforts have brought credit to the industry"
- Michael Williams (COM '79) – Academy Award and Emmy Award-winning producer, Queer Eye for the Straight Guy, Queer Eye
- Peter Del Vecho (CFA '80) – Academy Award-winning producer, Best Animated Feature film Frozen
- Jason Alexander (CFA '81) – Tony Award and Emmy Award-winning actor, best known for George Costanza on Seinfeld
- Kevin Burns (COM '81) – Emmy Award-winning producer of A&E's Biography series, also Ancient Aliens, America's Book of Secrets
- Debbie Liebling (COM '81) – Emmy Award-nominated producer, president of production at Universal Pictures, responsible for South Park
- Julianne Moore (CFA '83) – Academy Award-winning actress, Best Actress for Still Alice (2014), Best Actress nominee for The End of the Affair (2000) and Far from Heaven (2003), Best Supporting Actress for Boogie Nights(1998) and The Hours (2003), ranked eleventh on The New York Times' list of the greatest actors of the 21st century, named to Time's 100 most influential people in the world in 2015
- Mariel Hemingway (CFA '83) – Academy Award-nominated actress for Woody Allen's Manhattan, granddaughter of Ernest Hemingway
- Christopher Cousins (CFA '83) – actor, Ted Beneke on Breaking Bad, Cain Rogan on One Life to Live, also in Revolution
- Richard Gladstein (COM '83) – Academy Award-nominated producer, Pulp Fiction, She's All That, The Bourne Identity
- David E. Kelley (LAW '83) – eleven-time Emmy Award-winning and four-time Peabody Award-winning writer-producer of L.A. Law, Picket Fences, The Practice, Ally McBeal, Chicago Hope, Big Little Lies, Boston Legal, member of Television Hall of Fame
- Jensen Buchanan (CFA '84) – Emmy Award-nominated actress, Sarah Gordon on One Life to Live, Another World
- Steven Brill (CFA '84) – director, Mr. Deeds, Without a Paddle, Heavyweights, Drillbit Taylor, Little Nicky
- Scott Rosenberg (COM '85) – writer, producer, Con Air, Gone in 60 Seconds, Beautiful Girls, High Fidelity
- Gary Fleder (COM '85) – director, screenwriter, producer, Kiss the Girls, Don't Say a Word, Homefront
- Michael Chiklis (CFA '86) – Emmy Award and Golden Globe Award-winning actor, The Shield, known for playing The Thing in two Fantastic Four films (2005–2007)
- Marisa Tomei (CFA '86*) – Academy Award-winning actress, Best Supporting Actress for My Cousin Vinny (1993), Best Supporting Actress nominee for In the Bedroom (2002) and The Wrestler (2009)
- Tatiana S. Riegel (CAS '86) – Academy Award-nominated film editor, Best Film Editing nominee for I, Tonya
- Marc Maron (CAS '86) – comedian, more than 40 appearances on Late Night with Conan O'Brien
- Jamie Kaler (CAS '87) – actor, comedian, Mike Callahan on My Boys, Gary on Will & Grace
- Roy Conli (CFA '87) – Academy Award-winning producer, Best Animated Feature for Big Hero 6
- Jeffrey Ross (COM '87) – actor, comedian, Comedy Central Roast series, Netflix's Historical Roasts
- Michelle Hurd (CFA '88) – actress, Monique Jeffries in Law & Order: Special Victims Unit, The Glades
- Greg Fitzsimmons (CAS '89) – Emmy Award-winning writer, producer of The Ellen DeGeneres Show
- John Henson (CAS '89) – comedian, co-host of ABC's Wipeout, with John Anderson
- Andy Cohen (COM '90) – Emmy Award and Peabody Award-winning host, executive producer of the Real Housewives franchise
- Rocco DiSpirito (QST '90) – television personality, chef, restaurateur, star of The Restaurant
- Jennifer Getzinger (COM '90) – director, screen supervisor, Mad Men, Sex and the City, The Comeback, The Sopranos, The Devil Wears Prada
- Yan Luo (CFA '90) – actress, screenwriter, Pavilion of Women, first female Chinese filmmaker to produce, write, and star in a Hollywood film
- Esra Dermancioglu (CFA '90) – actress, Mukaddes Ketenci on popular Turkish drama series Fatmagül'ün Suçu Ne?
- Susan Dalian (CFA '90) – voice actress, voice of Haku in the first season of Naruto and the Screen Gems film The Brothers
- Kim Raver (CFA '91) – actress, Audrey Raines on 24, Dr. Teddy Altman on ABC's medical drama Grey's Anatomy
- Peter Paige (CFA '91) – actor, Emmett Honeycutt on Showtime's hit series Queer as Folk
- Stephen Kijak (COM '91) – filmmaker, Stones in Exile, Backstreet Boys: Show 'Em, Rock Hudson: All That Heaven Allowed
- Sam Sokolow (COM '91) – producer on National Geographic's Genius series, brother of Alec Sokolow
- Fabien Cousteau (CGS'89, MET'91) – documentary filmmaker, explorer-at-large for National Geographic, grandson of Jacques Cousteau
- Anthony Ruivivar (CFA '92) – actor, Carlos Nieto on Third Watch
- Krista Vernoff (CFA '93) – Emmy Award-winning co-executive producer of Grey's Anatomy and Shameless
- Cynthia Watros (CFA '93) – Emmy Award-winning actress, Annie Dutton on Guiding Light, Nina Reeves on General Hospital
- Thomas Golubić (COM '93) – Emmy Award-nominated and Grammy Award-nominated music supervisor, Better Call Saul, Breaking Bad, The Walking Dead, founding member and president of the Guild of Music Supervisors (2017–2019)
- Liz Patrick (COM'93) – Emmy Award-winning director, producer for The Ellen DeGeneres Show, fifth director of Saturday Night Live (2022–)
- Michaela Watkins (CFA '94) – actress, featured player on Saturday Night Live's 34th season, star of Hulu's Casual, The Unicorn, and Trophy Wife series, starred in The Back-up Plan (2010)
- Corinne Marrinan (CFA '95) – Academy Award-winning producer, Best Documentary (Short Subject) for A Note of Triumph
- Maura West (CFA '95) – Emmy Award-winning actress, Carly Tenney on As the World Turns, Ava Jerome on General Hospital
- Yunjin Kim (CFA '95) – actress, best known for Sun-Hwa Kwon on Lost
- Russell Hornsby (CFA '96) – actor, ABC Family's Lincoln Heights, HBO's In Treatment, NBC's Grimm
- Camille Guaty (COM '96) – actress, lead in hit movie Gotta Kick It Up! (2002), recurring roles in Prison Break, Scorpion, and Cupid series
- Megan McCormick (CAS '96) – television presenter, main host of British adventure tourism television series series Globe Trekker
- Dave Shalansky (CFA '96) – television actor, Grey's Anatomy, How to Get Away with Murder, Curb Your Enthusiasm, The Offer
- Alex Karpovsky (UNI '97) – actor, filmmaker, Ray Ploshansky on HBO series Girls
- Emily Deschanel (CFA '98) – actress, Fox series Bones, sister of Zooey Deschanel
- Erica Leerhsen (CFA '98) – actress, star in the horror hit The Texas Chainsaw Massacre (2003), known for Woody Allen films Hollywood Ending (2002), Anything Else (2003), Magic in the Moonlight (2014)
- Dan Fogler (CFA '98) – Tony Award-winning actor, Balls of Fury and Fantastic Beasts and Where to Find Them
- Raúl Castillo (CFA '99) – actor best known for his role of Richie Donado Ventura on the HBO series Looking
- Brian McLean (CFA '99) – Academy Award-winning visual effects pioneer of character animation-stop motion
- Rob Mariano (CAS '99) – reality television star known as "Boston Rob" on Survivor, first contestant to appear on Survivor six times and play five times, co-host of Sci Fi Investigates and The History Channel's Around the World in 80 Ways
- Kevin O'Connor (QST '99) – host of the PBS home renovation series This Old House
- Warren Kole (CFA '00) – actor, star in Showtime's Yellowjackets, Wes Mitchell on USA's Common Law, Robert Stahl in NBC's Shades of Blue, Spielberg's Into the West (2005), also in FOX's The Following
- Linda Park (CFA '00) – actress, Hoshi Sato in the television series Star Trek: Enterprise
- Noah Bean (CFA '00) – actor, Ryan Fletcher on The CW's action-thriller series Nikita, David Connor on the FX legal drama Damages
- Gene Farber (CFA '00) – actor, Vasily Karpov in Captain America: Civil War (2016)
- Vincent Larusso (QST '00) – actor, Adam Banks in The Mighty Ducks trilogy
- Ginnifer Goodwin (CFA '01) – actress, ABC's Once Upon a Time, Margene Heffman in HBO's Big Love
- Ashley Williams (CFA '01) – actress, Victoria in CBS's How I Met Your Mother, TV Land's The Jim Gaffigan Show, NBC's Good Morning Miami, fixture on Hallmark Channel, Lifetime, ABC Family
- Hong Chau (COM '01) – Academy Award-nominated actress, Best Supporting Actress for The Whale, starred in Netflix's The Menu, Wes Anderson's Asteroid City, A24's Showing Up, Ngoc Lan Tran in Downsizing, Netflix's The Night Agent
- Patrick Casey (COM '01) – screenwriter, Violent Night and the Sonic the Hedgehog series
- Baron Vaughn (CFA '03) – actor, comedian, Bud Bergstein on Netflix series Grace and Frankie
- Theo Alexander (CFA '03) – actor, Talbot in HBO's True Blood
- Ryan Sypek (CFA '04) – actor, co-star of ABC Family series Wildfire
- Corinne Brinkerhoff (COM '04) – Emmy Award-nominated producer of Jane the Virgin, creator and executive producer of American Gothic, co-producer of The Good Wife, writer on Boston Legal
- Katya Zamolodchikova (CFA '04*) – actor, comedian, drag queen on RuPaul's Drag Race, Viceland series The Trixie & Katya Show, half of Trixie and Katya, a popular comedy duo
- Uzo Aduba (CFA '05) – three-time Emmy Award-winning actress in Netflix's Orange Is the New Black and Hulu's Mrs. America
- Noureen DeWulf (CFA '05) – actress, known for West Bank Story (2005), Ghosts of Girlfriends Past (2009), The Back-up Plan (2010), Lacey on Anger Management (2012–2014)
- Nora Grossman (COM '05) – Academy Award-nominated producer, Best Picture for The Imitation Game (2014)
- Sara Chase (CFA '05) – actress, Cyndee Pokorny on Netflix's Unbreakable Kimmy Schmidt
- Henry Hughes (COM '06) – Academy Award-nominated director, Best Live Action Short for Day One (2015)
- Tala Ashe (CFA '06) – actress, American Odyssey, As the World Turns, CW's Legends of Tomorrow
- Katie Kubert (COM '06) – comic book editor, DC Comics, related to comic book artists Joe Kubert, Adam Kubert, Andy Kubert
- Josh Safdie (COM '07) – co-director of A24's Uncut Gems, Palme d'Or-nominee Good Time, Heaven Knows What, co-founder of Elara Pictures
- Benjamin Safdie (COM '08) – co-director of A24's Uncut Gems, Palme d'Or-nominee Good Time, Heaven Knows What, starred in Licorice Pizza, Are You There God? It's Me, Margaret., actor in Oppenheimer, co-founder of Elara Pictures
- Jessica Rothe (CFA '09) – actress, Paige on MTV comedy series Mary + Jane, La La Land, Happy Death Day
- Kristine Leahy (COM '09) – host of NBC's American Ninja Warrior, former sports journalist
- Jenn Proske (COM '09) – actress, Becca Crane on Vampires Suck, also CSI: NY, House of Lies
- Jane Schoenbrun (COM '09) – director, screenwriter, producer, We're All Going to the World's Fair, I Saw the TV Glow
- Evan Puschak (COM '10) – creator of The NerdWriter, host of Discovery Channel's Seeker Daily
- Edmund Donovan (CFA '12) – actor, Hightown, Betty, High Fidelity, Orange Is the New Black
- Sydney Lemmon (CFA '12) – actress, stars as Ana Helstrom on Hulu series Helstrom, also on HBO's Succession and Fear the Walking Dead
- Hampton Fluker (CFA '13) – actor, Marcus Tufo on Shades of Blue, Scotch Tape in The Terror
- Ellen Tamaki (CFA '14) – actress, Niko Hamada on Charmed, Drea Mikami on Manifest

=== Theatre ===
- Craig Lucas (CFA '73) – Pulitzer Prize-nominated and Tony Award-nominated, playwright, screenwriter
- Stewart F. Lane (CFA '73) – Tony Award-winning producer, won Best Musical four times
- Fred Zollo (CAS '75) – Academy Award-nominated, seven-time Tony Award-winning producer
- Moritz von Stuelpnagel (CFA'00) – Tony Award-nominated producer, Best Direction of a Play
- Bob Avian (CFA '59) – Tony Award-winning choreographer, won Award for Best Choreography twice
- Martin Sherman (CFA '60) – Tony Award-nominated known for Bent
- Jess Goldstein (CFA '72) – Tony Award-winning costume designer, won Best Costume Design for The Rivals
- James L. Nederlander (CGS '80) – Tony Award-winning Broadway theatre owner, operator
- Brad Oscar (CFA '86) – Tony Award-nominated actor best known for The Producers, Big Fish
- Chay Yew (COM '92) – actor
- Amber Gray (CFA '04) – Tony Award-nominated actress, Natasha Pierre & the Great Comet of 1812, Hadestown

== Journalism, news broadcasting and radio ==
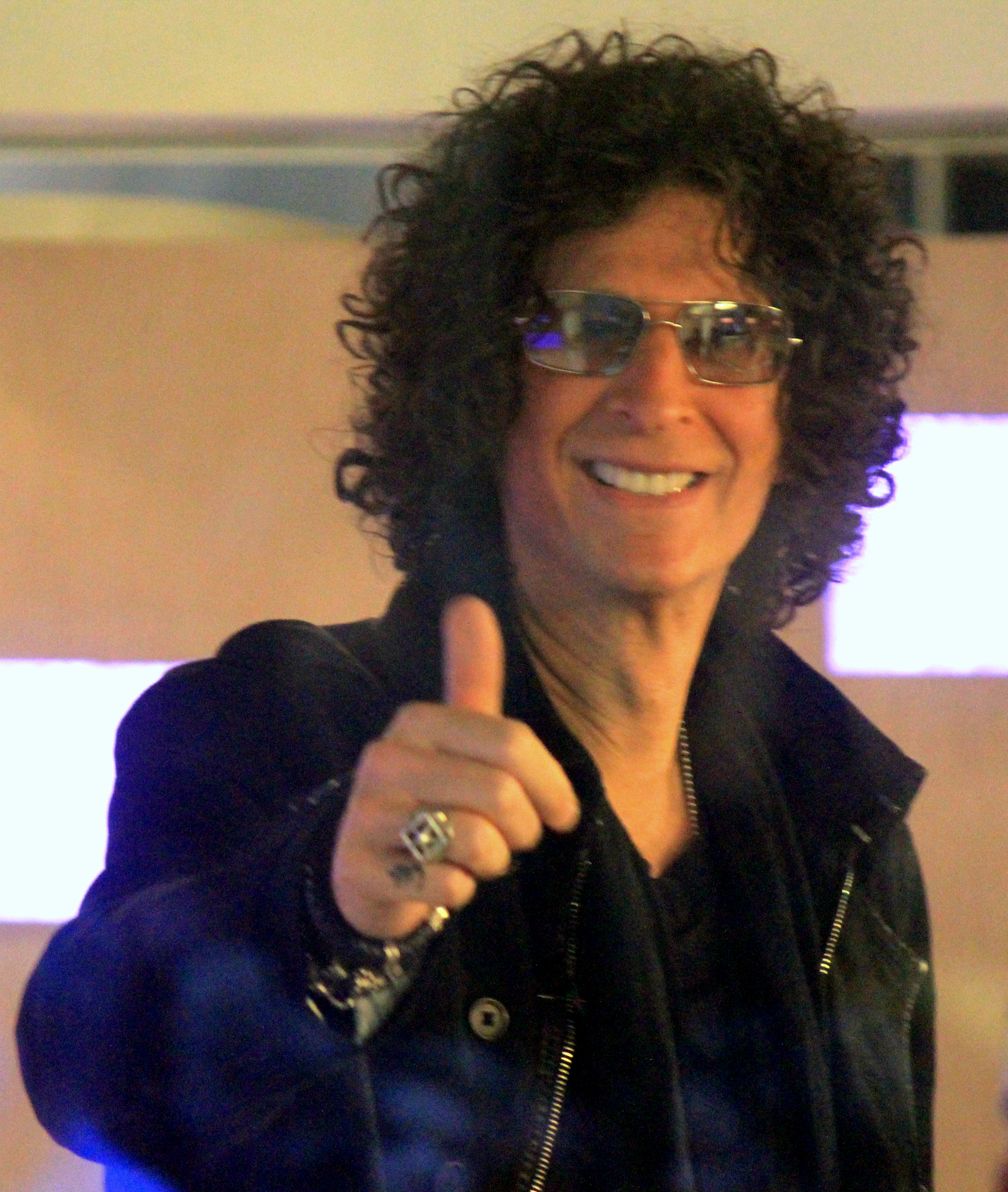
Howard Stern (COM '76), radio personality, host of The Howard Stern Show

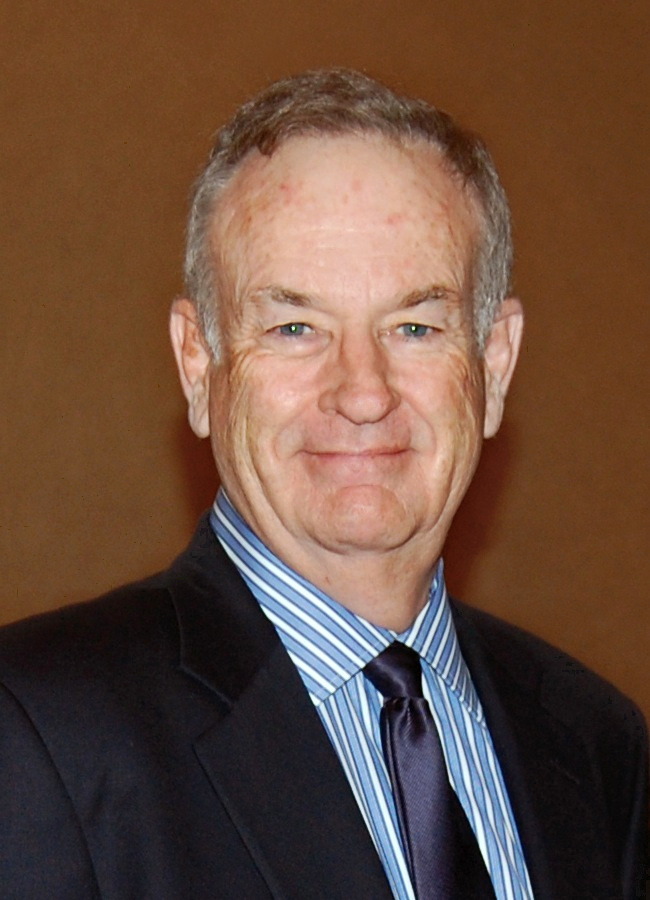
Bill O'Reilly (COM '75), host of The O'Reilly Factor, the highest-rated U.S. cable news show for 16 years

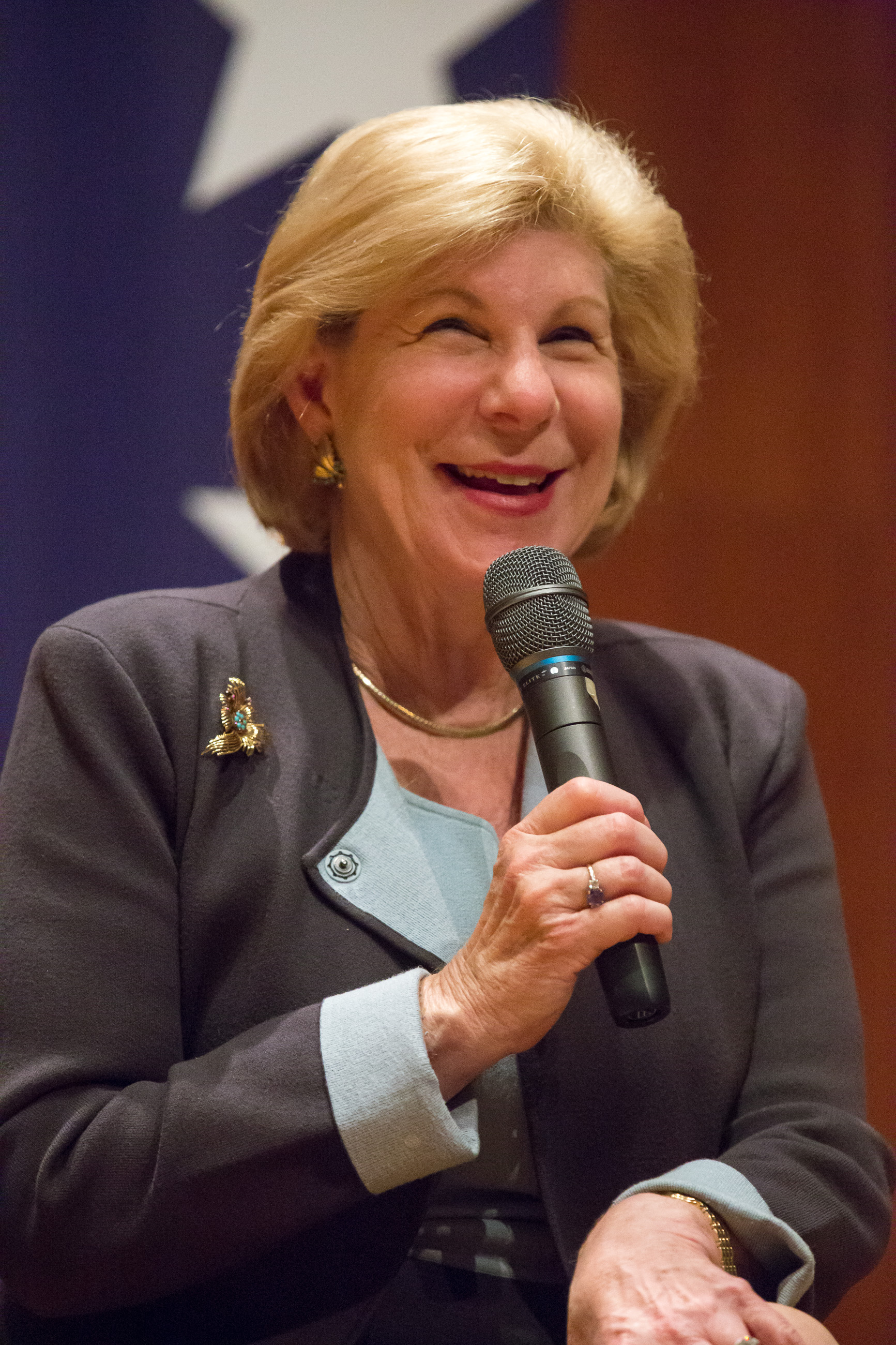
Nina Totenberg Nina Totenberg (COM 65*), legal affairs correspondent for NPR, one of NPR's "founding mothers"

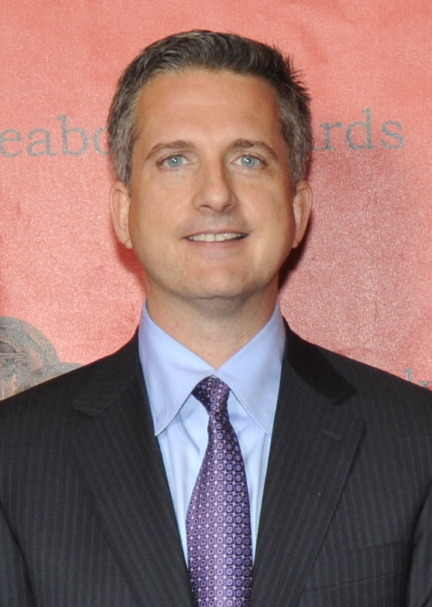
Bill Simmons (COM '93), ESPN columnist, CEO of the sports and pop culture website The Ringer

Full list of notable alumni in the journalism, news broadcasting and radio section.

- Eliza Putnam Heaton (CAS 1880) – journalist, editor
- Anne O'Hagan Shinn (CAS 1890) – The New York Times journalist and suffragist, known for detailing the exploitation of young women working as shop clerks in early 20th-century America
- Edwin Grozier (CAS 1881) – publisher of the Boston Post, The Boston Globe
- Tom Fitzgerald (1929*) – The Boston Globe sports journalist
- Carl Mydans (QST '30) – pioneering photojournalist, joined Life as one of its earliest staff photographers, from 1936 into the 1950s
- Fred Allen – The Fred Allen Show (1932–1949) made him one of the most popular and forward-looking humorists in the Golden Age of American radio
- Chet Simmons (COM '52) – first ESPN president, ABC Sports executive, NBC Sports president, USFL commissioner, Sports Broadcasting Hall of Fame in 2010, helped build ABC Sports into a leader in sports programming, developed Wide World of Sports
- Ron Della Chiesa (COM '59) – radio personality
- Gordon Hyatt (CFA '56) – producer and writer, CBS documentaries and public broadcasting
- Donald Lambro (COM '62) – chief political correspondent of The Washington Times
- Mike Barnicle (CAS '65) – journalist, radio host
- Nina Totenberg (COM 65*) – correspondent for National Public Radio, one of NPR's "Founding Mothers"
- Stephen Kurkjian (CAS '66) – Pulitzer Prize-winning journalist for The Boston Globe, won Pulitzer Prize for Investigative Reporting in 1972 and 1980, won Pulitzer Prize for Public Service in 2003, won George Polk Award in 1982 and 1994
- George Strait (CAS '67) – journalist, founder of the National Association of Black Journalists, known for appearances on World News Tonight with Peter Jennings* Gerard M. O'Neill (CAS '70) – Pulitzer Prize-winning journalist
- David Doubilet (COM '70) – National Geographic photographer
- Tom Magliozzi (QST '71) – Peabody Award-winning co-host of Car Talk, 2014 inductee into National Radio Hall of Fame
- Joseph Nocera (COM '74) – Pulitzer Prize for Commentary finalist, columnist, New York Times
- Bill O'Reilly (COM '75) – The O'Reilly Factor, the highest-rated U.S. cable news show for 16 years
- Howard Stern (CGS '74, COM '76) – host of The Howard Stern Show
- Loyd Grossman (CAS '75) – presenter of BBC's MasterChef (1990–2000), co-presenter of Through the Keyhole with David Frost, visiting homes of many British and American celebrities
- Jim Vicevich (COM '77) – radio host of Sound Off Connecticut
- Karen Holmes Ward (COM '77) – radio host of Cityline, director at WCVB-TV
- Jim Donovan (COM '78) – news anchor, play-by-play announcer for NBC Sports' NFL coverage (1987–1997), radio voice of the Cleveland Browns Radio Network since 1999
- Kevin Merida (COM '79) – executive editor of the Los Angeles Times, senior VP at ESPN, editor-in-chief of The Undefeated
- Glenn Consor (COM '80) – NBA and NCAA basketball sports broadcaster
- Erica Hill (COM '82) – CNN anchor and national correspondent
- Anthony Tommasini (CFA '82) – The New York Times chief music critic
- Gary Tuchman (COM '82) – CNN national correspondent
- Anthony Radziwill (COM '82) – Emmy Award-winning NBC anchor and reporter, Peabody Award for an investigation on the resurgence of Nazism in the United States, son of Caroline Lee Bouvier Canfield, nephew of First Lady Jacqueline Kennedy, spouse of Carole Radziwiłł
- Steve Paikin (COM '83) – anchor of TVOntario's, Ontario's public broadcaster, flagship current affairs program The Agenda with Steve Paikin
- Joseph Hallinan (COM '84) – Pulitzer Prize-winning journalist
- Don Van Natta Jr. (COM '86) – Pulitzer Prize-winning journalist
- Linda Vester (COM '87) – anchor, NBC News at Sunrise, DaySide with Linda Vester on Fox News
- Randi Kaye (COM '89) – CNN correspondent, Anderson Cooper 360
- Sharon Tay (COM '89) – Emmy Award-winning MSNBC anchor, host of "MSNBC at the Movies," and "MSNBC Entertainment Hot List"
- Dana Tyler (QST '90) – Emmy Award-winning CBS news anchor
- Tyler Hicks (COM '93) – Pulitzer Prize-winning journalist for The New York Times, two-time winner of the Pulitzer Prize for Breaking News Photography, Pulitzer Prize for International Reporting
- Liz Cho (COM '92) – news anchor, WABC-TV, flagship of ABC's network in New York City, co-anchored Eyewitness News
- Dave Goucher (COM '93) – NHL play-by-play broadcaster for the Vegas Golden Knights
- Monica Larner (COM '92) – award-winning critic, first Italian wine editor for Wine Enthusiast, Italian reviewer for The Wine Advocate
- Elizabeth Cohen (SPH '92) – CNN senior medical correspondent
- Bill Simmons (COM '93) – ESPN columnist, CEO of the sports and pop culture website The Ringer, The Bill Simmons Podcast
- Michele LaFountain (COM '94) – anchor, ESPN SportsCenter en espanól, first Puerto Rican to anchor ESPN's Spanish SportsCenter
- Noah Pransky (COM '98) – NBC News national political correspondent
- Kimbriell Kelly (COM '98) – Pulitzer Prize-winning journalist
- Steve Kornacki (COM '01) – NBC News national political correspondent, cable news' 2016 breakout star
- Jeremy Hobson (COM '04) – co-host, NPR's Here and Now
- Kristin Fisher (COM '05) – Fox News, journalist and television news presenter
- Alexandra Cooper (COM '17) – radio personality, Host of "Call Her Daddy" podcast
- Justin Kutcher – NFL, NCAA, and MLB play-by-play broadcaster for Fox

== Literature and poetry ==
- Jhumpa Lahiri (CAS '93, UNI '95, UNI '97) – Pulitzer Prize for Fiction (2000) for Interpreter of Maladies
- Carl Phillips (CAS '93) – Pulitzer Prize for Poetry (2023)
- David Grann (GRS '94) – author, Killers of the Flower Moon
- Anne Sexton (GRS*) – Pulitzer Prize for Poetry (1967)
- Sylvia Plath (GRS*) – Pulitzer Prize for Poetry (1982)
- George Starbuck (GRS*) – poet
- Ha Jin (GRS '94) – author, member of American Academy of Arts and Letters
- Judy Blume (CAS '60*) – writer, named one of the 100 most influential people in the world by Time magazine in 2023
- Robert B. Parker (GRS '57) – most famous works were the 40 novels written about the fictional private detective Spenser; ABC television network developed the television series Spenser: For Hire, cited as reviving, changing the detective genre by critics and bestselling authors
- Robert Munsch (CAS '71, GRS '73) – poet, children's author, author of Love You Forever, which was listed fourth on the 2001 Publishers Weekly All-Time Bestselling Children's Books list for paperbacks at 6.97 million copies
- Elizabeth George Speare (GRS '82) – children's author, one of six writers with two Newbery Medals, Educational Paperback Association's top 100 authors
- Ellen Bass (1970 M.A.) – poet and author
- Percy Jewett Burrell (pre-1900 B.O., School of Oratory) – dramatist
- Adam Cesare – horror writer
- Hal Clement (WED 1946 M.Ed.) – science fiction author, inducted into Science Fiction and Fantasy Hall of Fame
- Kim Stanley Robinson (GRS 1975 M.A.) – science fiction author
- Nicholas Gage (DGE 1961, COM B.S. 1963, HON LtD 1985) – author, Eleni, A Place For Us, Greek Fire
- Peter Guralnick (1971 M.A.) – author focused on twentieth-century American popular music
- Younghill Kang – author, Guggenheim Fellow
- William Ellery Leonard (1899) – poet
- Gladys Edson Locke (A.B. 1910; A.M. 1911) — novelist and librarian
- Susan Miller (SSW 1979 MSS) – author
- Stewart O'Nan (ENG 1983 B.S.) – author
- Robert B. Parker (GRS 1957 M.A., 1971 Ph.D.) – author, Spencer for Hire and other mystery novels
- Norman Vincent Peale (STh) – minister, author
- John Perkins (SMG 1968 BSB) – economist, author
- Lauren Slater (WED 1995 EDD [Doctor of Education]) – author, psychologist
- Neal Stephenson (CLA 1981 B.A.) – science fiction author
- Ada Josephine Todd (Ph.D. 1886) – author and educator
- Dorothy West – author, member of Harlem Renaissance
- Bart Yates (M.M. 1988) – author
- Pat Brown (MBA 2007) – author, criminal profiler, TV commentator
- Casey Sherman
- Roger MacBride Allen (CAS '79) – author
- Rhea Tregebov (GRS '78) – Canadian poet, children's author
- Anne Sexton – Pulitzer Prize–winning poet (deceased)
- Nicole Blackman – artist, poet, author, vocalist, goth icon

== Politics, government, and law ==
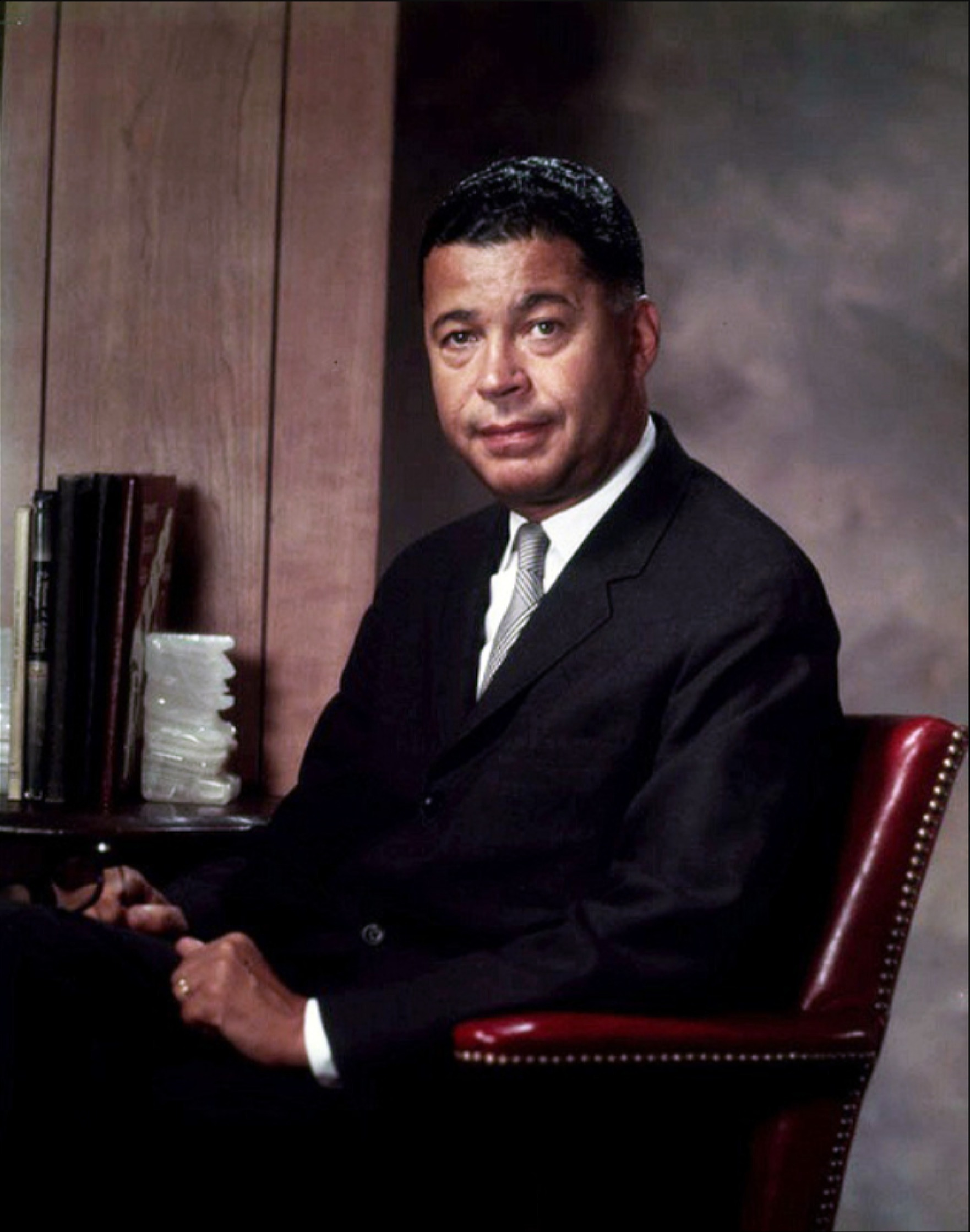
Edward Brooke III (LAW '48) – first African-American elected to the U.S. Senate by popular vote, Presidential Medal of Freedom recipient

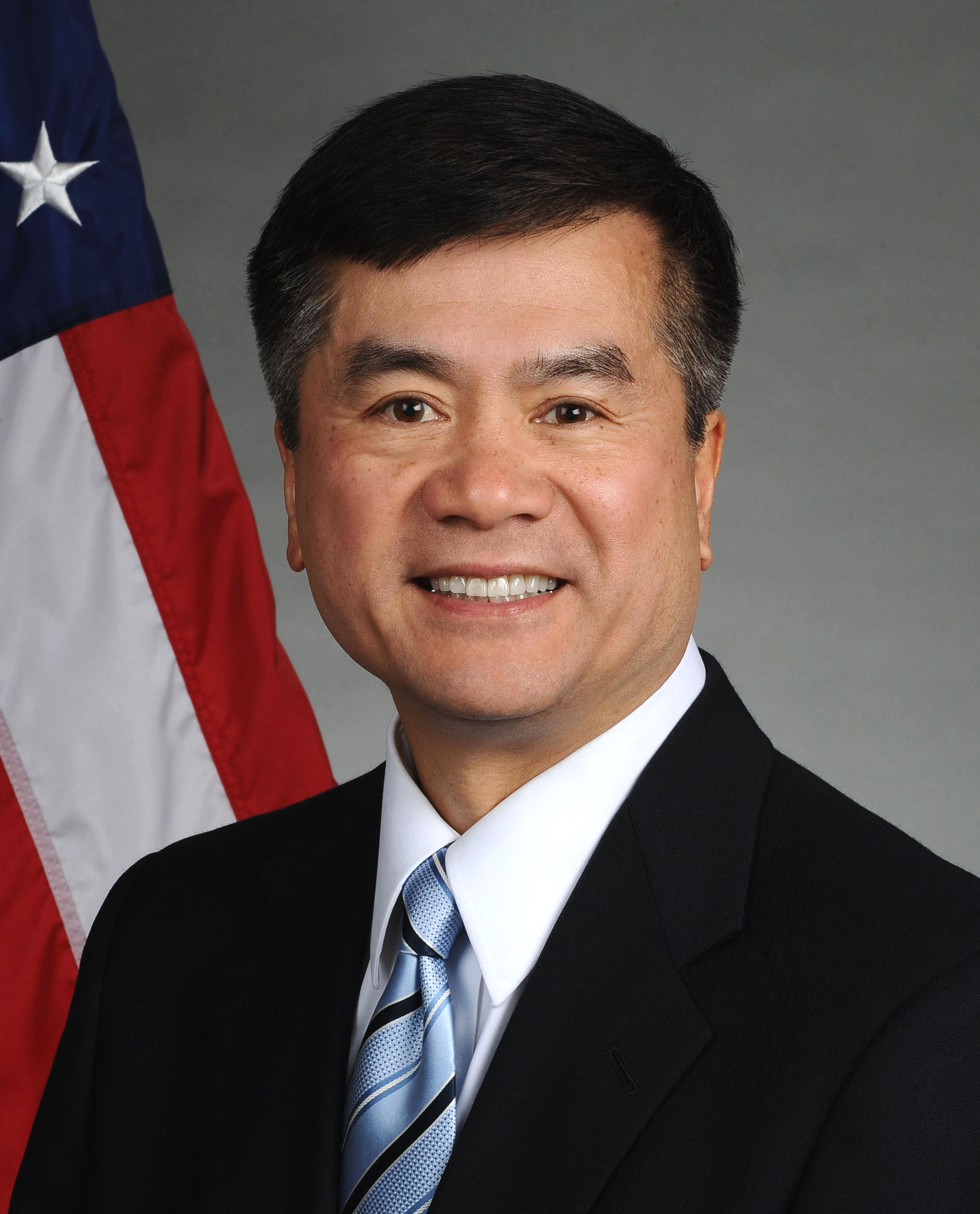
Gary Locke (LAW '75) – 36th U.S. secretary of commerce, first Asian American governor, U.S. ambassador to China

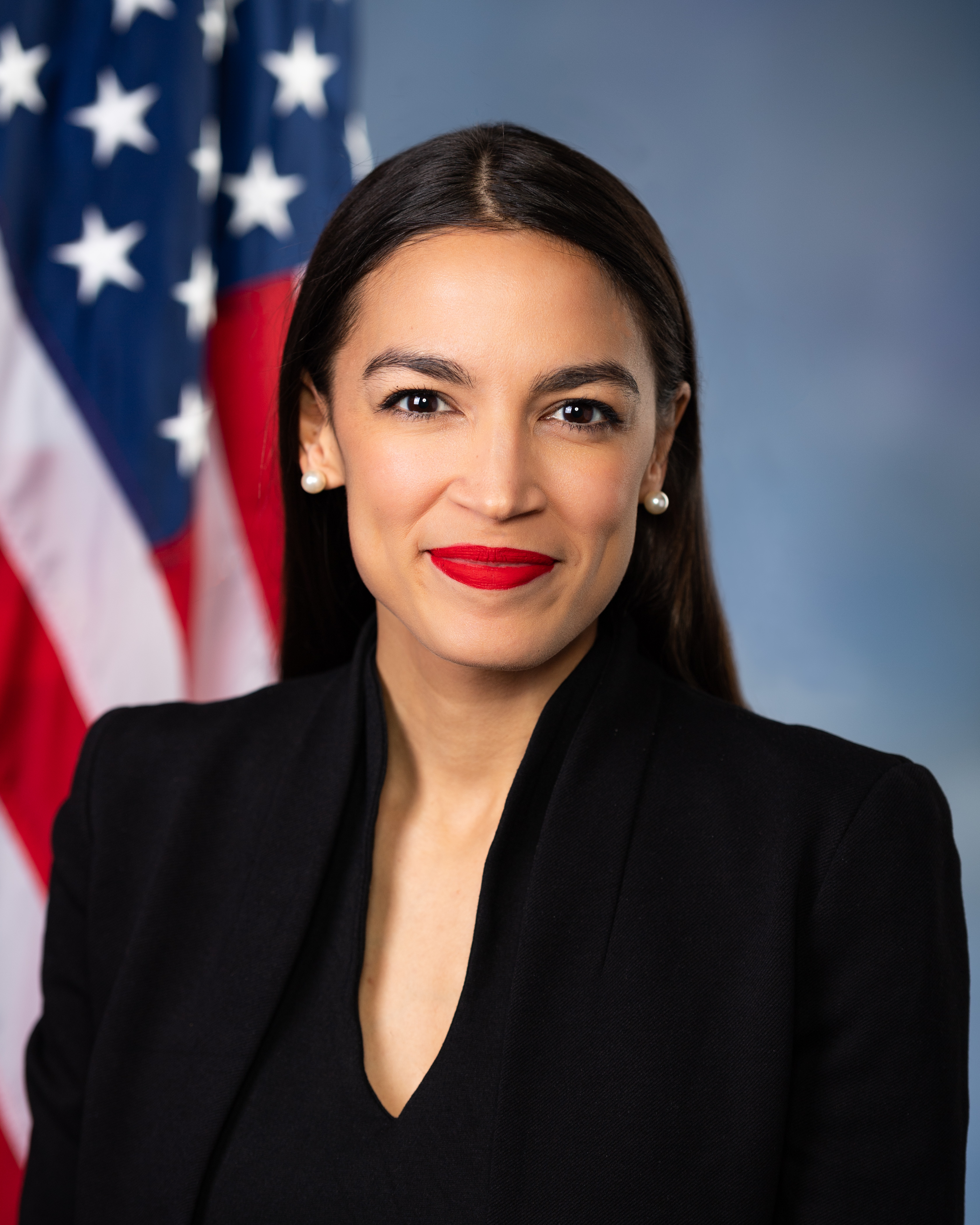
Alexandria Ocasio-Cortez (CAS '11) – youngest woman ever elected to the U.S. Congress

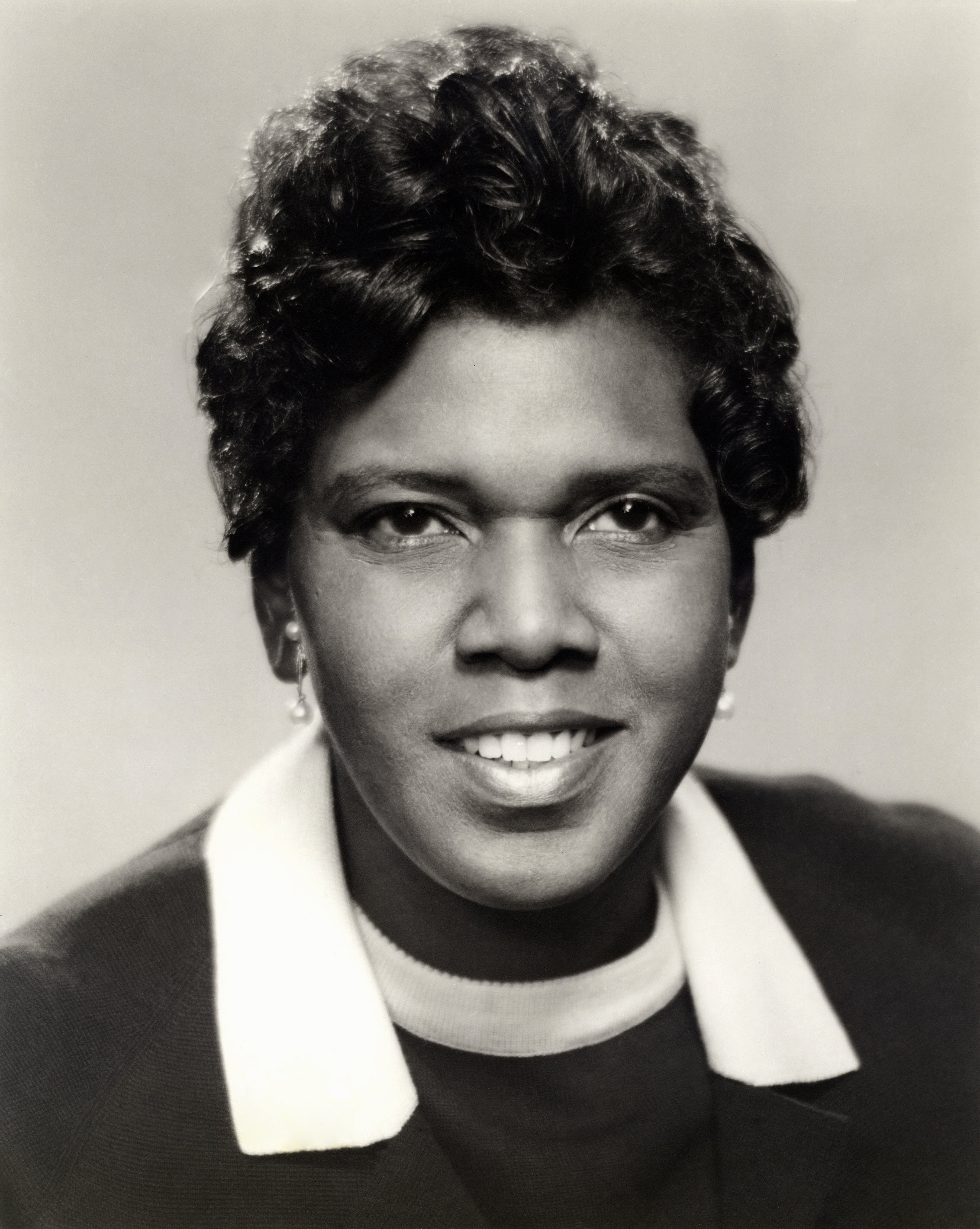
Barbara Jordan (LAW '59) – first African American woman elected to the U.S. House from a Southern state

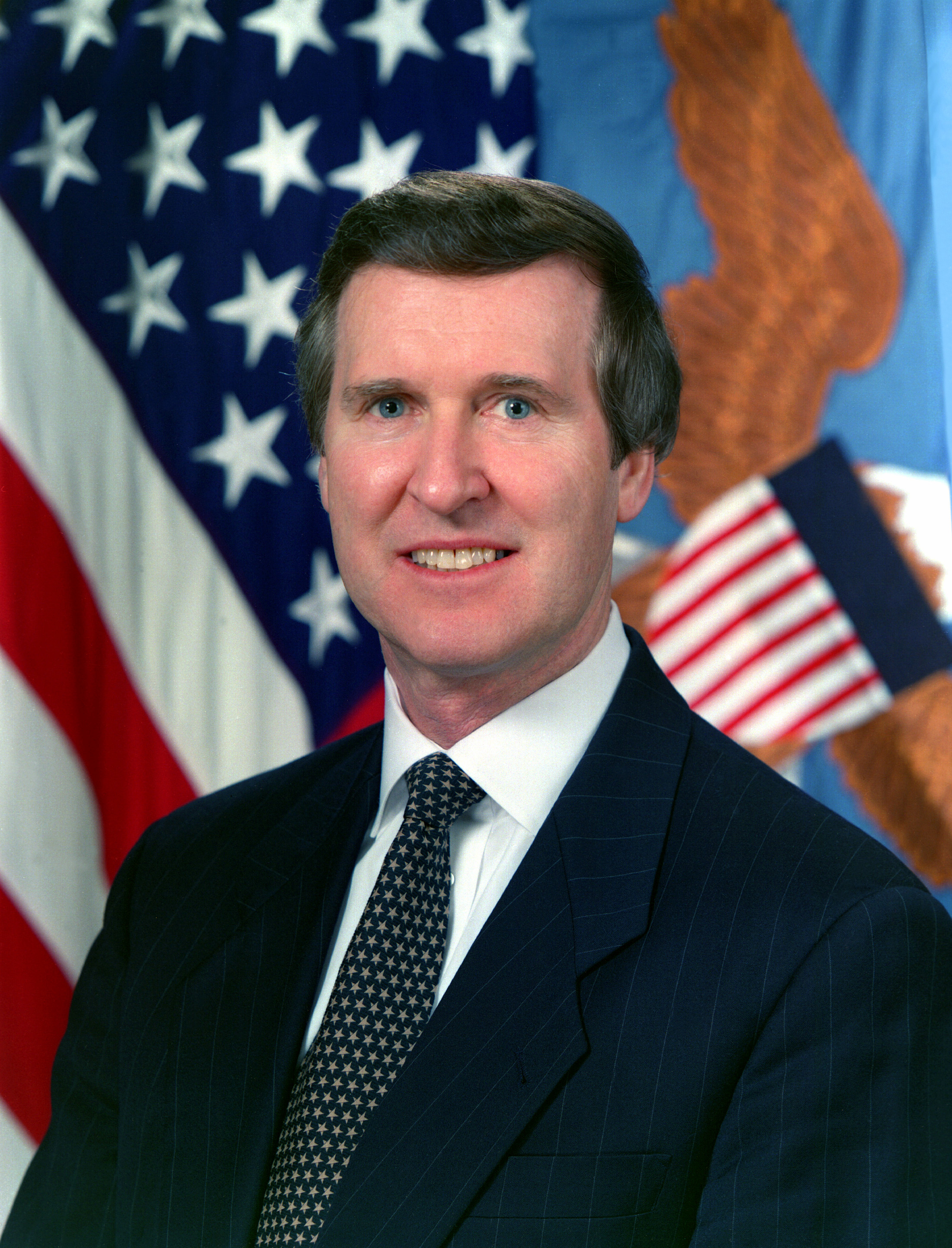
William Cohen (LAW '65) – 20th U.S. secretary of defense, U.S. senator from Maine

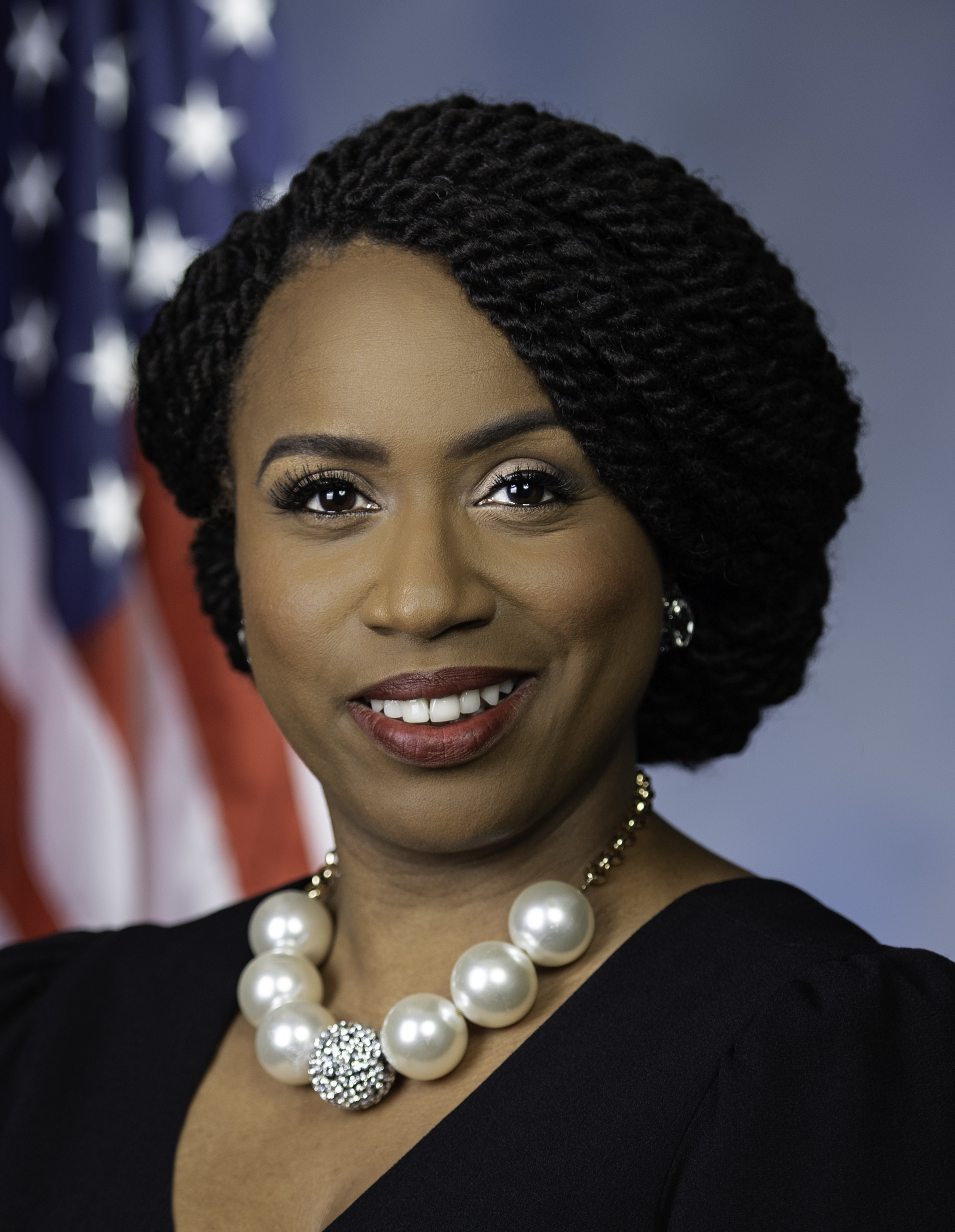
Ayanna Pressley (CAS '94*) – first African American woman elected to represent Massachusetts in the U.S. Congress

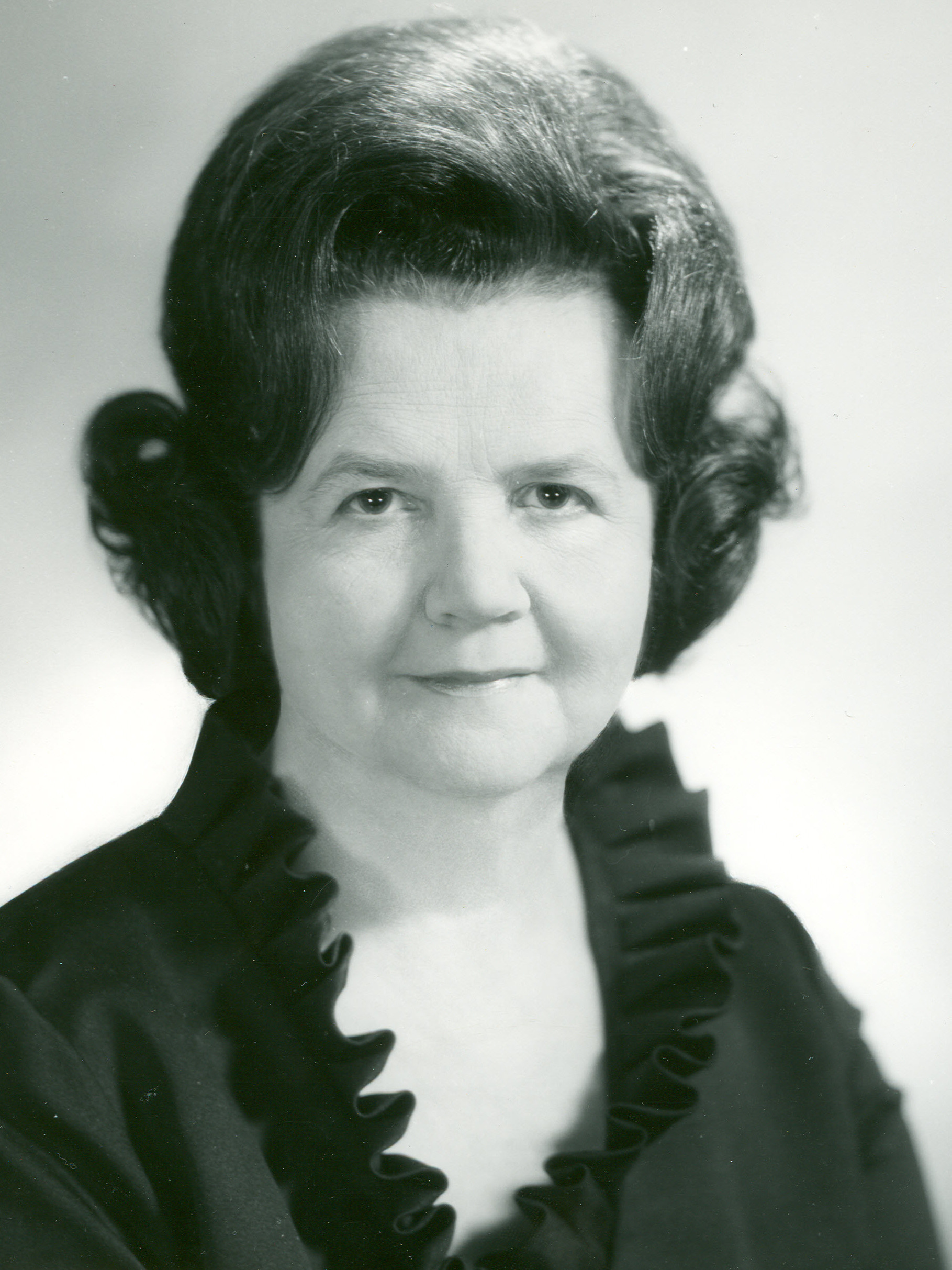
Louise Day Hicks (WED '52) – first Democrat woman to represent Massachusetts in the U.S. Congress

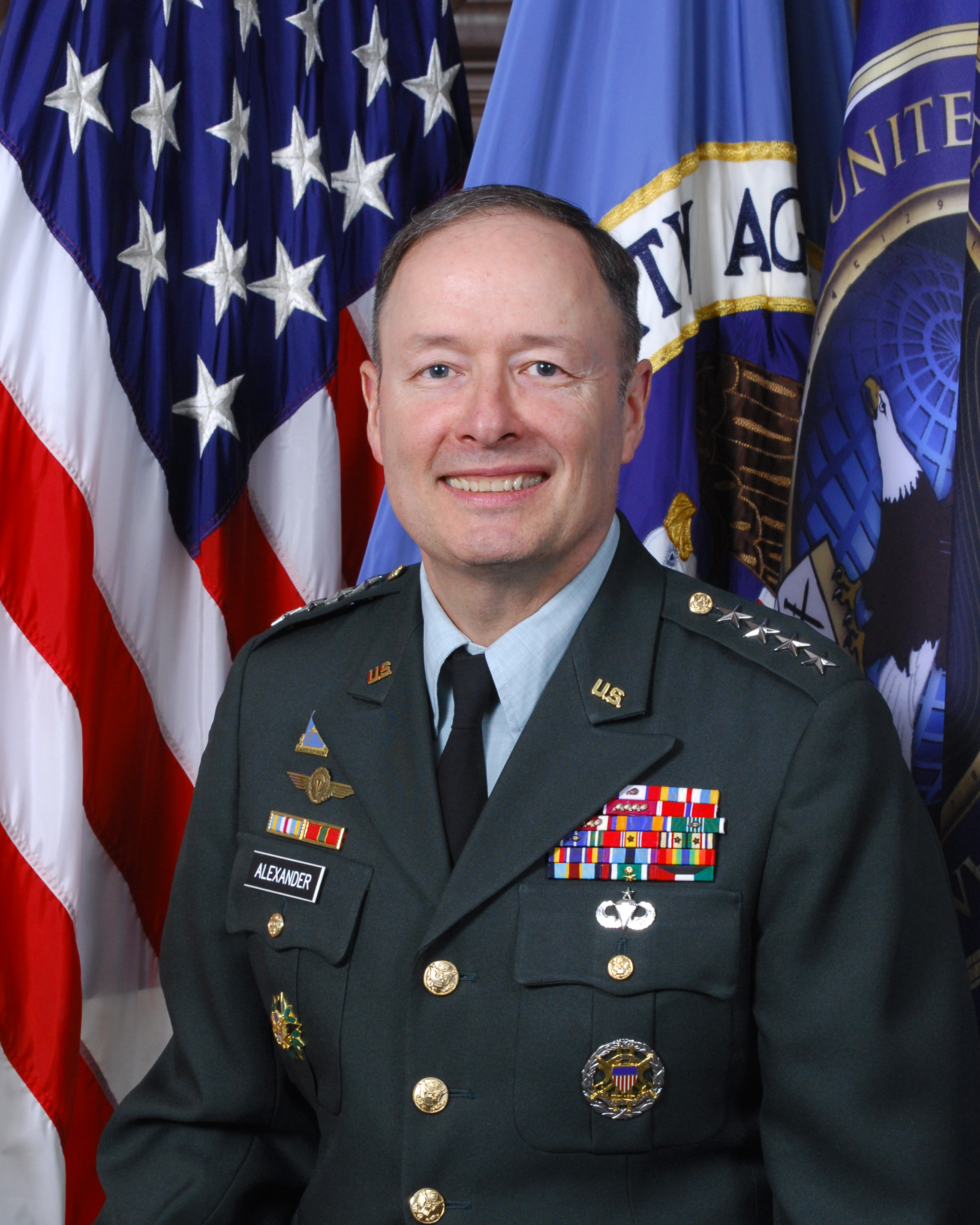
Keith B. Alexander (QST '78) – first commander of United States Cyber Command, 16th director of the National Security Agency

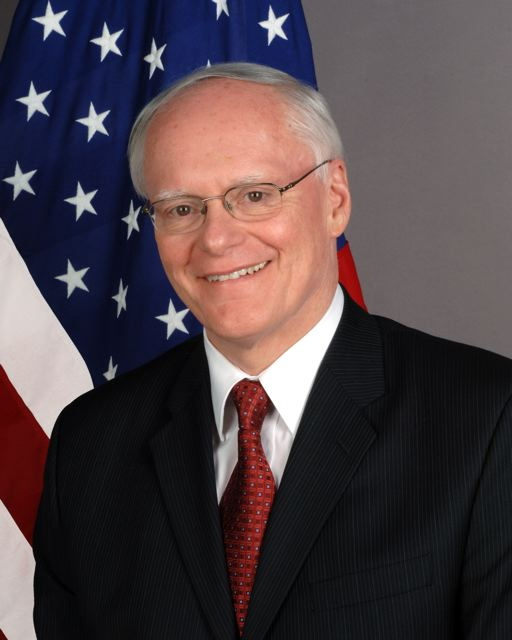
James Franklin Jeffrey (QST '77) – 23rd United States deputy National Security advisor, U.S. ambassador to Iraq, Turkey, and Albania

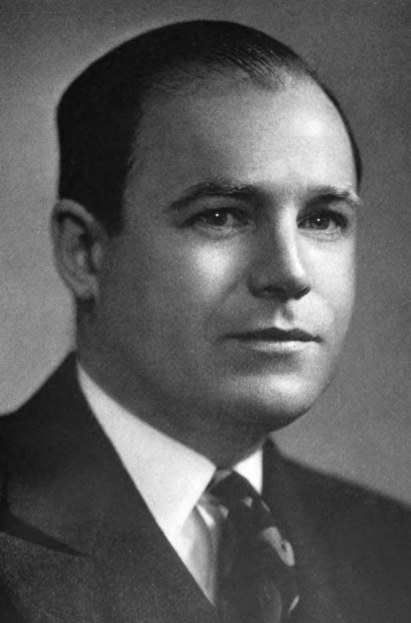
J. Howard McGrath (LAW '29) – 60th United States attorney general, 27th U.S. solicitor general

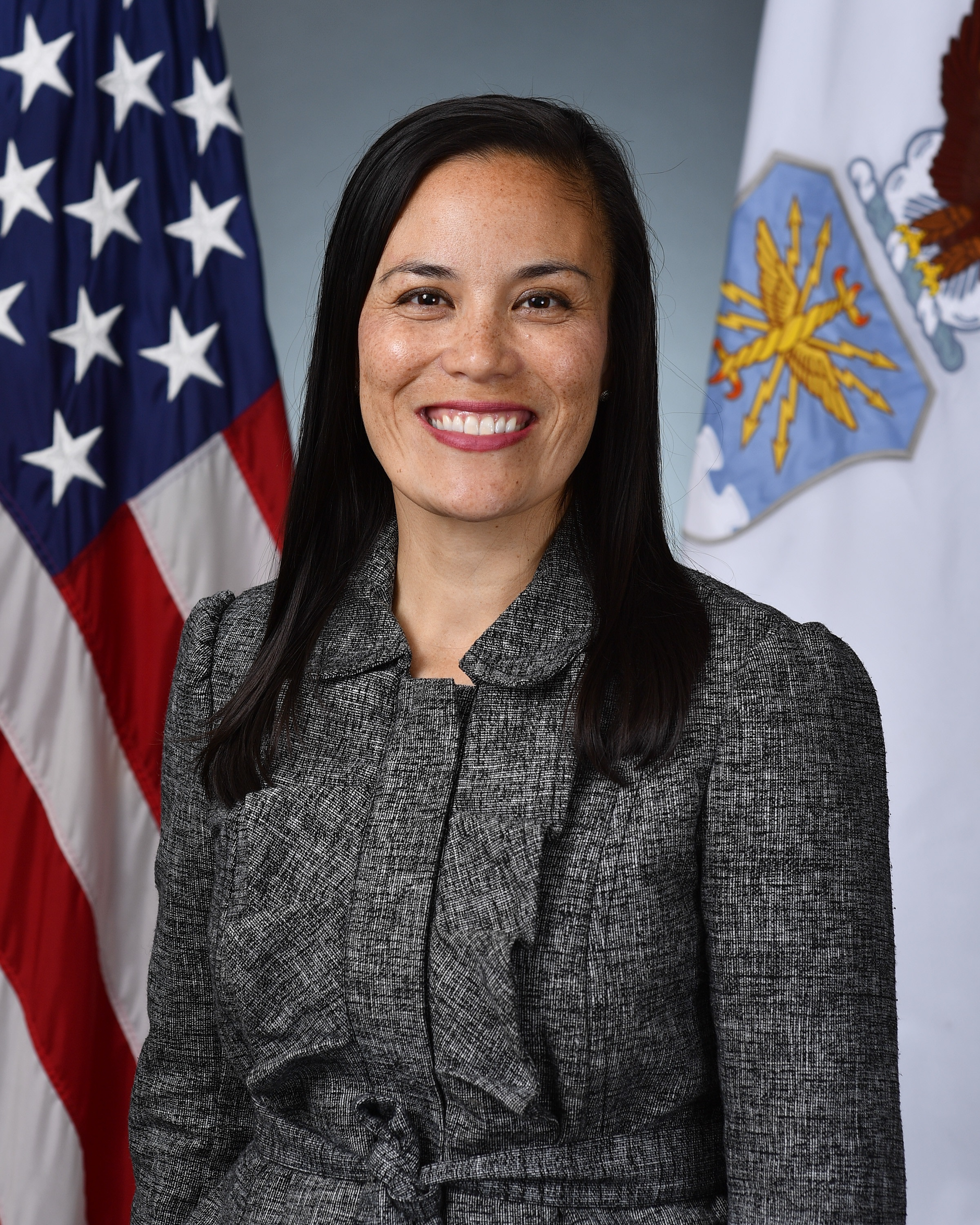
Gina Ortiz Jones (CAS '03) – 27th U.S. under secretary of the Air Force, first woman of color and first open LGBT person in that role

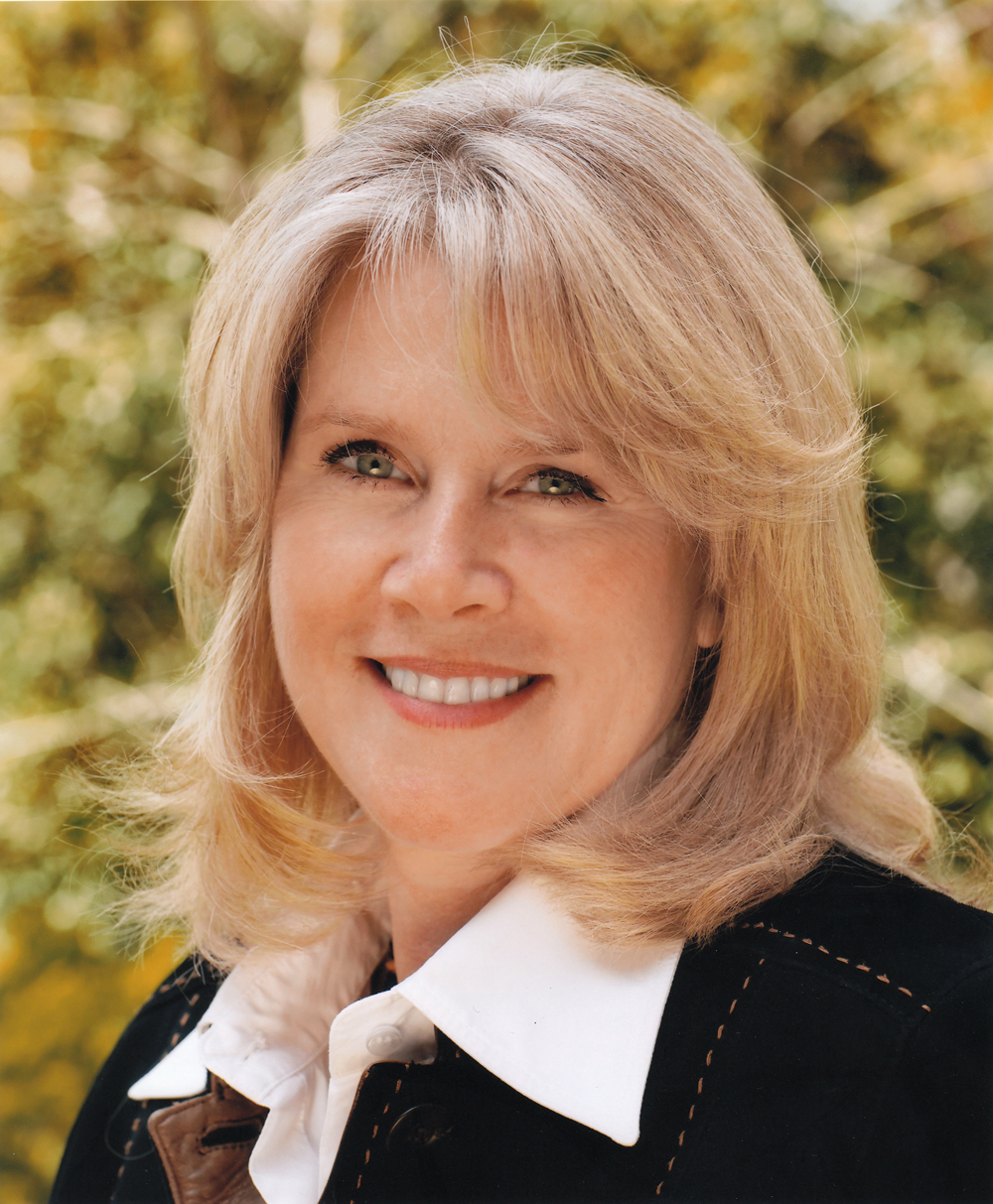
Tipper Gore (CAS '70) – 33rd Second Lady of the United States

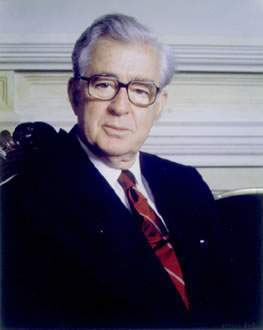
Virgilio Barco Vargas (GRS '54) – 27th president of Colombia, 20th Colombia ambassador to the U.K., 18th Colombia ambassador to the United States, 6th mayor of Bogotá

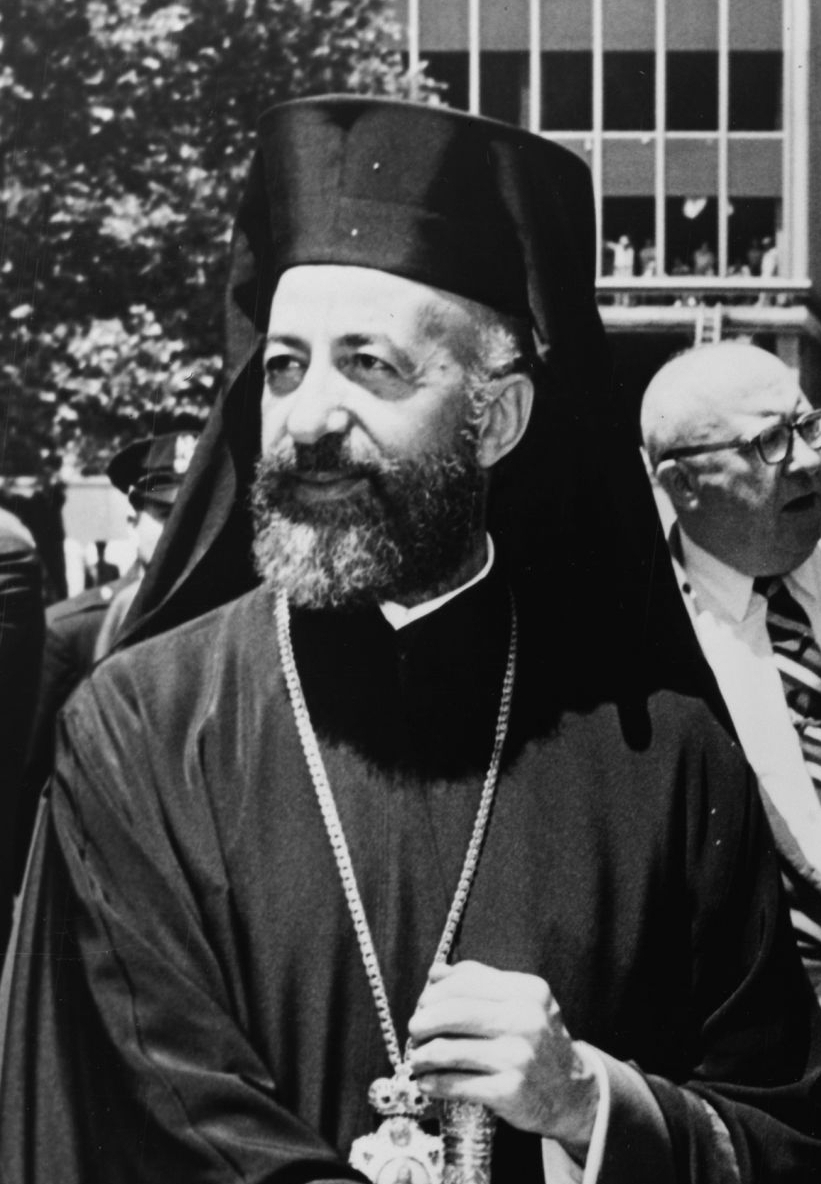
Makarios III (STH '48) – 1st and 4th president of Cyprus, key figure in the nation's independence, symbol of Cypriot national identity

Officials may have served in other capacities previously listed. In such cases, the name is left unlinked, but the description will indicate the location of a linked entry.

=== U.S. governors ===
Name	Degree	Office
John Lewis Bates	CAS 1882, LAW 1885	41st governor of Massachusetts
William Russell	LAW 1879	37th governor of Massachusetts
Albert O. Brown	LAW 1884	58th governor of New Hampshire
Samuel D. Felker	LAW 1887	54th governor of New Hampshire
David I. Walsh	LAW 1897	46th governor of Massachusetts
Fred H. Brown	LAW 1905	59th governor of New Hampshire
Paul Dever	LAW 1926	58th governor of Massachusetts
J. Howard McGrath	LAW 1929	60th governor of Rhode Island
Dennis Joseph Roberts	LAW 1930	63rd governor of Rhode Island
Robert Stafford	LAW 1938	71st governor of Vermont
Lincoln Almond	LAW 1961	72nd governor of Rhode Island
Judd Gregg	LAW 1972, LAW 1975	76th governor of New Hampshire
Gary Locke	LAW 1975	21st governor of Washington
Bob McDonnell	QST 1980	71st governor of Virginia

=== U.S. senators ===
Name	Degree	Office
William M. Butler	LAW 1884	United States senator from Massachusetts
David I. Walsh	LAW 1897	United States senator from Massachusetts
Robert Upton	LAW 1907	United States senator from New Hampshire
J. Howard McGrath	LAW 1929	United States senator from Rhode Island
Robert Stafford	LAW 1938	United States senator from Vermont
Thomas J. McIntyre	LAW 1940	United States senator from New Hampshire
Edward Brooke III	LAW 1948	United States senator from Massachusetts
William Cohen	LAW 1965	United States senator from Maine

=== U.S. House of Representatives ===
Name	Degree	Office
Charles Joyce	STH 1850	Vermont's 1st district
George Williams	LAW 1874	Massachusetts's 9th district
Daniel L. D. Granger	LAW 1877	Rhode Island's 1st district
Ernest W. Roberts	LAW 1877	Massachusetts's 7th and 9th
Walter Stiness	LAW 1877	Rhode Island's 2nd district
Henry F. Naphen	LAW 1879	Massachusetts's 10th district
John Crawford Crosby	LAW 1881	Massachusetts's 12th district
Charles F. Sprague	LAW 1881	Massachusetts's 11th district
Joseph E. Casey	LAW 1884	Massachusetts's 3rd district
Forrest Goodwin	LAW 1888	Maine's 3rd district
Edward Hills Wason	LAW 1890	New Hampshire's 2nd district
John Andrew Sullivan	LAW 1896	Massachusetts's 11th district
Joseph Walsh	LAW 1905	Massachusetts's 16th district
Ambrose Kennedy	LAW 1906	Rhode Island's 3rd district
Jeremiah E. O'Connell	CAS 1906, LAW 1908	Rhode Island's 3rd district
Arthur Daniel Healey	LAW 1913	Massachusetts's 8th district
John Patrick Higgins	LAW 1926	Massachusetts's 11th district
James Roosevelt	LAW 1931*	California's 26th district
Robert Stafford	LAW 1938	Vermont's at-large district
Emilio Q. Daddario	LAW 1941*	Connecticut's 1st district
Frank Morse	CAS 1948, LAW 1949	Massachusetts's 5th district
Fred Richmond	CAS 1946	New York's 14th district
Louise Day Hicks	WED 1952	Massachusetts's 9th district
Connie Morella	CAS 1954	Maryland's 8th district
Ferdinand St. Germain	LAW 1955	Rhode Island's 1st district
Barbara Jordan	LAW 1959	Texas's 18th district
Paul W. Cronin	CAS 1962	Massachusetts's 5th district
Antonio Colorado	CAS 1962	7th Resident Commissioner of Puerto Rico
Norman D'Amours	LAW 1963	New Hampshire's 1st district
Charles Douglas III	LAW 1968	New Hampshire's 2nd district
Brian J. Donnelly	CAS 1970	Massachusetts's 11th district
Lois Frankel	CAS 1970	Florida's 21st and 22nd districts
Joe Hoeffel	CAS 1972	Pennsylvania's 13th district
Judd Gregg	LAW 1972, LAW 1975	New Hampshire's 2nd district
Jim Marshall	LAW 1977	Georgia's 3rd and 8th districts
James H. Maloney	LAW 1980	Connecticut's 5th district
Jen Kiggans	CAS 1993	Virginia's 2nd district
Ayanna Pressley	CGS 1994*	Massachusetts's 7th district
Alexandria Ocasio-Cortez	CAS 2011	New York's 14th district

=== U.S. diplomats, federal agencies and appointments ===
- William Cohen (LAW '65) – 20th U.S. secretary of defense (see U.S. governors)
- Gary Locke (J.D. 1975) – 36th U.S. secretary of commerce (see U.S. governors)
- James Rubin (GRS '86) – 22nd assistant secretary of state for Public Affairs, chief spokesman for the State Department (1997–2000) Madeleine Albright's "right-hand man", spouse of Christiane Amanpour
- Louis Wade Sullivan (MED) – 17th U.S. secretary of Health and Human Services
- Sumner G. Whittier (CAS '36) – 5th head of United States Department of Veterans Affairs
- Keith B. Alexander (MBA) – 1st commander of United States Cyber Command, 16th Director of the National Security Agency
- Gary Locke (LAW '75) – U.S. ambassador to China (see U.S. governors)
- David Mulford (CAS '62) – U.S. ambassador to India
- James Franklin Jeffrey (QST '77) – U.S. ambassador to Iraq, U.S. ambassador to Turkey, 23rd United States deputy National Security advisor, U.S. ambassador to Albania
- George F. Williams (LAW '74) – 5th U.S. ambassador to Montenegro, U.S. Ambassador to Greece (see U.S. representatives)
- Brian J. Donnelly (CAS '70) – U.S. ambassador to Trinidad and Tobago (see U.S. representatives)
- Connie Morella – U.S. ambassador to the OECD (see U.S. representatives)
- David Young (STH '87, CAS '88) – U.S. ambassador to Malawi, U.S. ambassador to Zambia
- Jim Marshall (LAW '77) – president of the United States Institute of Peace (see U.S. representatives)
- Norman D'Amours (LAW '63) – chairman of the National Credit Union Administration (see U.S. representatives)
- Joshua DuBois (CAS '03) – head of Office of Faith-Based and Neighborhood Partnerships
- Colleen Graffy, assistant secretary, U.S. Department of State, Public Diplomacy for Europe and Eurasia
- Stephen Douglas Johnson (LLM 1989) – U.S. House chief counsel for Financial Institutions and Consumer Credit 1995–98
- Antonio Colorado (CAS '62) – 13th secretary of state of Puerto Rico (see U.S. representatives)

=== U.S. judiciary ===
- Emma Fall Schofield (CAS 1906) – appointed as one of the first female judges in Massachusetts
- J. Howard McGrath (LAW '29) – 60th United States attorney general, 27th U.S. solicitor general
- Lincoln Almond (LAW '61) – United States attorney for the District of Rhode Island (see U.S. governors)
- Rebecca C. Lutzko (CAS '93) – U.S. attorney for the Northern District of Ohio
- Harrie B. Chase (LAW '12) – chief judge of the Second Circuit, appointed by Coolidge (1929–1969)
- George W. Anderson (LAW '90) – senior judge of the First Circuit appointed by Wilson (1918–1938)
- Edward McEntee (LAW '33) – judge of the First Circuit appointed by Johnson (1965–1976)
- Juan R. Torruella (LAW '90) – chief judge of the First Circuit, appointed by Reagan (1984–2001)
- Sandra Lynch (LAW '71) – senior judge of the First Circuit, appointed by Clinton, first woman appointed to the First Circuit (2008–)
- O. Rogeriee Thompson (LAW '76) – senior judge of the First Circuit appointed by Obama (2010–)
- Frank Freedman (LAW '49, LAW '50) – chief judge of U.S. District Court for the District of Massachusetts appointed by Nixon
- Elisha Hume Brewster (LAW '96) – senior judge of U.S. District Court for the District of Massachusetts appointed by Harding
- William T. McCarthy (LAW '08) – senior judge of the U.S. District Court for the District of Massachusetts appointed by Truman
- Margaret R. Guzman (LAW '92) – judge of U.S. District Court for the District of Massachusetts appointed by Biden
- Arthur Daniel Healey (LAW '13) – judge of U.S. District Court for the District of Massachusetts appointed by Roosevelt
- John Milton Younge (CAS '77) – judge of the U.S. District Court for the Eastern District of Pennsylvania appointed by Trump
- Frank J. Williams – chief justice, Rhode Island Superior Court
- Peter W. Agnes Jr. – associate justice of Massachusetts Appeals Court
- Barbara Pariente (COM '70) – chief justice, Florida Supreme Court (Authored the Terri Schiavo decision)
- Armand Arabian – retired justice, California Supreme Court
- Chuck Douglas (LAW '68) – associate justice of the New Hampshire Supreme Court (see U.S. House of Representatives)
- Don Gorton (CAS B.A. 1982) – commissioner, Commonwealth of Massachusetts Appellate Tax Board

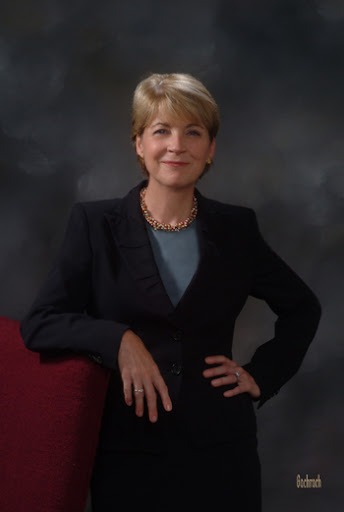
Martha Coakley, first female attorney general of Massachusetts

=== U.S. state officials ===
Boston University graduates have been elected to all six Massachusetts state constitutional offices. Alumni include the first female officers for attorney general of Massachusetts and treasurer of Massachusetts, and the first African-American attorney general of Massachusetts.

- Henry Converse Atwill (LAW '97) – 23rd attorney general of Massachusetts
- Jay R. Benton (LAW '10) – 26th attorney general of Massachusetts
- Paul Dever (LAW '26) – 29th attorney general of Massachusetts (see U.S. governors)
- Edward J. McCormack Jr. (LAW '52) – 34th attorney general of Massachusetts
- Edward Brooke (LAW '48) – 35th attorney general of Massachusetts, first African-American to serve (see U.S. senators)
- Martha Coakley (LAW '79) – 43rd attorney general of Massachusetts, first female to serve in that role
- Frederick Mansfield (LAW '02) – 38th treasurer of Massachusetts
- Shannon O'Brien (LAW '85) – 55th treasurer of Massachusetts, first woman to serve in that role
- Deb Goldberg (CAS '75) – 58th treasurer of Massachusetts
- A. Joseph DeNucci (MED '77) – 21st auditor of Massachusetts, longest-serving auditor in Massachusetts history
- Barry Locke (CAS '53) – Massachusetts secretary of Transportation and chairman of the MBTA
- Joseph D. Ward (LAW '76) – 22nd Massachusetts secretary of the Commonwealth
- Sumner G. Whittier (CAS '36) – 58th lieutenant governor of Massachusetts (see U.S. diplomats)
- Kyle Evans Gay (LAW '12) – 27th lieutenant governor of Delaware
- Judge Benjamin Smith (LAW ‘02) - Texas State District Judge - 380th District Court

=== U.S. state legislators ===
- Walt Brown (GRS '61) – Oregon state senator from the 13th/12th district
- Lois Frankel (CAS '70) – Florida state representative
- Shirley Owens-Hicks (WED '70) – Massachusetts state representative from the Sixth Suffolk District
- Nancy Hasty Evans (MET '72) – Massachusetts state representative from the 13th Middlesex district
- Andy Vargas (CAS '15) – Massachusetts state representative from the 3rd Essex district
- Connie Morella (CAS '54) – Maryland state delegate from the 16th district
- Polly W. Beal – Wisconsin State Assembly member
- Irving Fishman – Massachusetts state senator
- William H. Hatch – New Hampshire state representative
- Russell Holmes – Massachusetts state representative (6th Suffolk)
- Joan M. Menard – Massachusetts state senator
- Martha Ware – Massachusetts jurist and politician
- Shaun Filiault – New Hampshire state representative (Cheshire 7

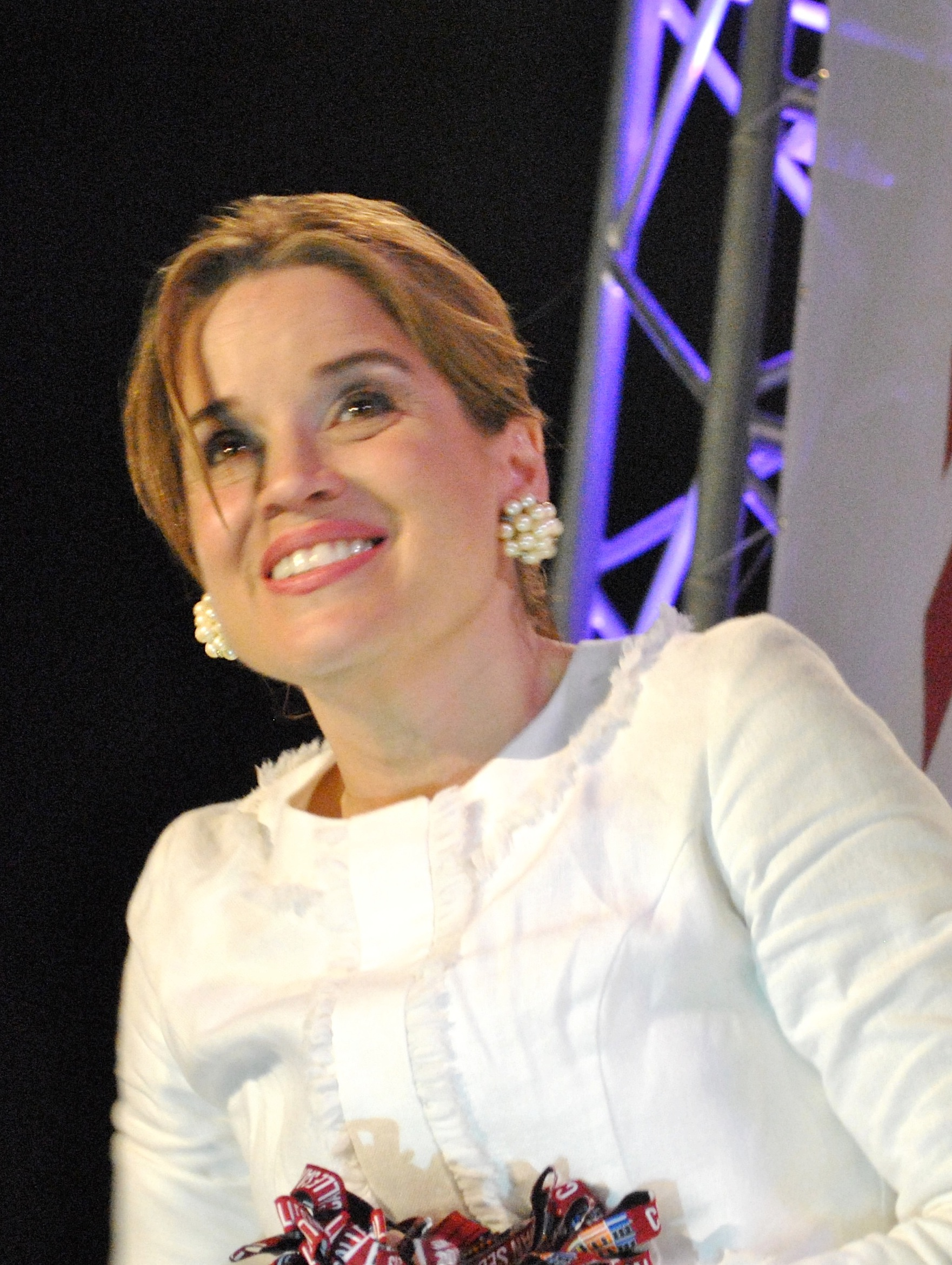
Carmen Yulín Cruz, mayor of San Juan, Puerto Rico

=== U.S. municipal ===
- Maynard Jackson (LAW '59*) – 54th and 56th mayor of Atlanta, GA
- Frederick Mansfield (LAW '02) – 45th mayor of Boston, MA (see state officials)
- Carmen Yulín Cruz (CAS '84) – 29th mayor of San Juan, PR, capital, most populous city in Puerto Rico (see U.S. Congress)
- Edwin D. McGuinness (LAW '79) – 19th mayor of Providence, RI, Providence's first Irish Catholic mayor
- Daniel L. D. Granger (LAW '77) – 21st mayor of Providence, RI (see U.S. representatives)
- John F. Collins (LAW '08) – 28th mayor of Providence, RI
- Dennis Joseph Roberts (LAW '30) – 29th mayor of Providence, RI (see U.S. governors)
- Frank Freedman (LAW '49, LAW '50) – 46th mayor of Springfield, MA (see U.S. district courts)
- Jim Marshall (LAW '77) – mayor of Macon, GA (see U.S. representatives)
- Lois Frankel (CAS '70) – mayor of West Palm Beach, Florida (see U.S. representatives)
- Samuel J. Tedesco (LAW '38) – 42nd mayor of Bridgeport, CT, 96th lieutenant governor of CT
- Edward J. Kennedy (CAS '73) – 90th mayor of Lowell, MA
- John C. Mongan (CAS '50) – 42nd & 44th mayor of Manchester, NH
- Louise Day Hicks (WED '52) – president of the Boston City Council (see U.S. representatives)
- Michael F. Flaherty (JD) – president of the Boston City Council
- Ayanna Pressley (CGS '94) – member of the Boston City Council at-large (see U.S. representatives)

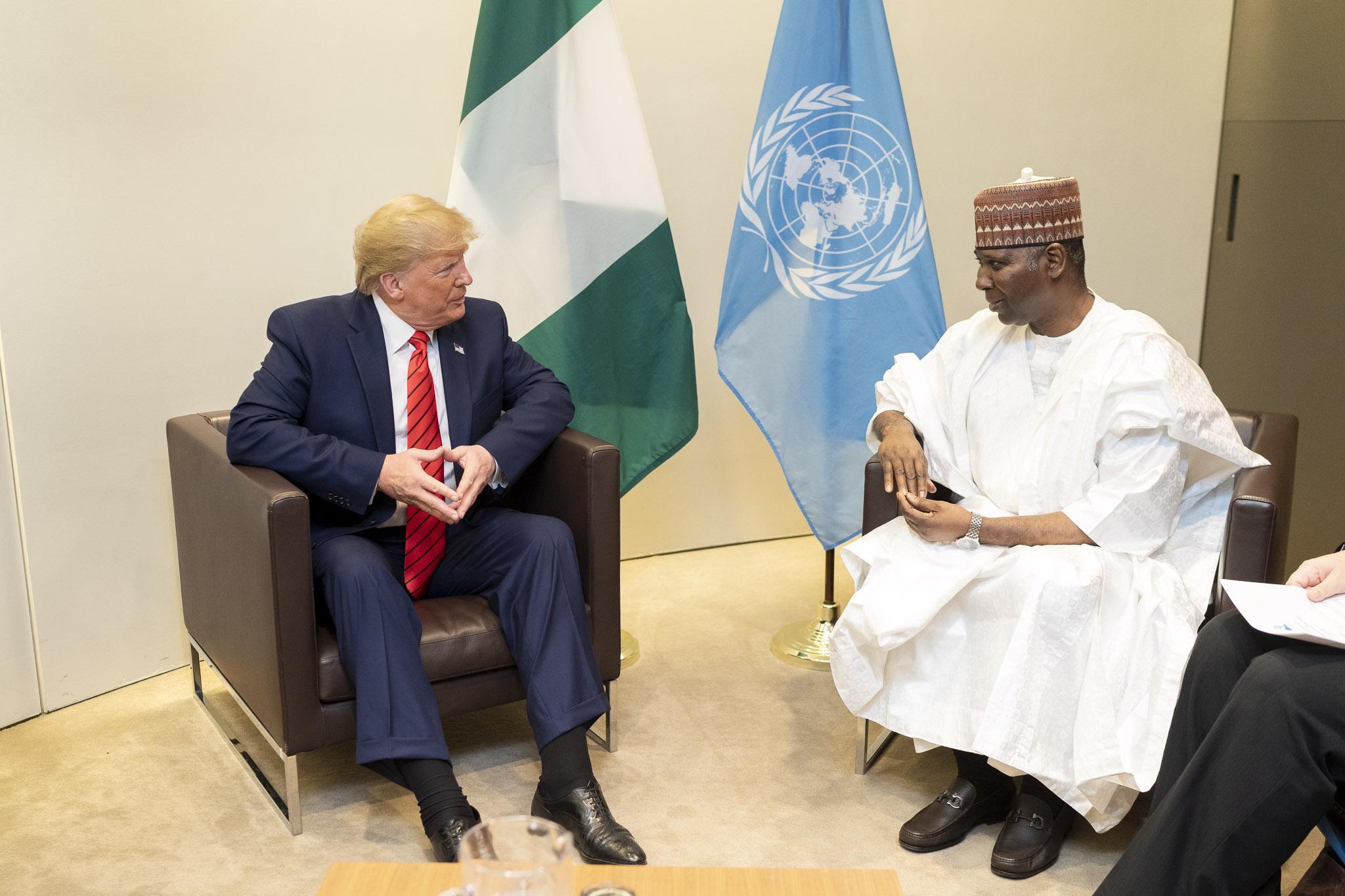
Tijjani Muhammad-Bande, president of the 74th UN General Assembly

=== International government, politics, and royalty ===
- Virgilio Barco Vargas (GRS '54) – 27th president of Colombia, 20th Colombia ambassador to the United Kingdom, 18th Colombia ambassador to the United States, 6th mayor of Bogotá
- Makarios III (STH '48) – 1st and 4th president of Cyprus, a key figure in the island's struggle for independence and a symbol of Cypriot national identity
- Alfred Sant (QST '76) – 11th prime minister of Malta
- Fan S. Noli (GRS '45) – 13th prime minister of Albania
- Faisal al-Fayez (attended CAS 1981) – 34th prime minister of Jordan
- Tijjani Muhammad-Bande (GRS '81) – president of the 74th UN General Assembly
- Gigi Tsereteli (SPH '05) – 16th president of Parliamentary Assembly of the Organization for Security and Co-operation in Europe, minister of Health, Labour and Social Affairs of Georgia
- Rafic Hariri (Hon.'86) – 43rd prime minister of Lebanon, BU Board of Trustees (1990–2003)
- Oscar Arias (CAS '61*) – president of Costa Rica, winner of the 1987 Nobel Peace Prize
- John-Paul Marks (GRS '03) – permanent secretary to the Scottish Government, the most senior civil servant in Scotland
- George Henry Murray (LAW 1883) – 8th premier of Nova Scotia
- Henry Emmerson (LAW 1887) – 9th premier of New Brunswick
- Hiroshige Seko (COM '92) – 14th minister of Economy, Trade and Industry in Japan
- Rizal Ramli (GRS '90) – 29th Minister of Finance, 4th Coordinating Minister for Maritime Affairs
- Mukhriz Mahathir (QST '89) – 11th and 13th Menteri Besar of Kedah, deputy minister of International Trade and Industry
- Win Gatchalian (QST '95) – senator of the Philippines (2016–), Mayor of Valenzuela, Philippines, 11th largest city in the Philippines
- Kristrún Frostadóttir (CAS '14) – 33rd prime minister of Iceland
- Keiko Fujimori (QST '97) – president of Peru (2026–), leader of Peru's Fujimorist political party, Popular Force (2009–), First Lady of Peru (1994–2000), congresswoman representing the Lima Metropolitan Area (2006–2011), daughter of former president of Peru Alberto Fujimori (1990–2000)
- Mark Regev (MET '98) – ambassador of Israel to the United Kingdom
- Wilma Pastrana (QST '92) – 13th First Lady of Puerto Rico
- Aamer Sarfraz (QST '02) – member of the House of Lords, Prime Ministerial Trade Envoy to Singapore
- Milind Deora (QST '99) – Parliament of India, minister of State of Ministry of Communications and IT, Ministry of Shipping
- Attiya Inayatullah (GRS) – member of the National Assembly of Pakistan
- Saki Macozoma (attended) – anti-apartheid activist imprisoned alongside Nelson Mandela
- Margaret Ng (STH Ph.D.) – member of the Legislative Council of Hong Kong (1995–2012)
- Fung Hu-hsiang (Ph.D. in philosophy) - member of the Legislative Yuan of the Republic of China (1999-2002)
- Christopher O'Neill (CAS '96) – British-American financier; husband of Princess Madeleine of Sweden
- Jafar Hassan – 44th prime minister of Jordan

=== Military ===
- B. Chance Saltzman (CAS '91) – 2nd chief of Space Operations United States Space Force
- Gina Ortiz Jones (CAS '03) – 27th U.S. under secretary of the Air Force, first woman of color and first open lesbian in that role
- Shoshana Chatfield (CAS '88) – first female president of the Naval War College (2018–2023)
- William Francis Buckley (CAS '55) – Beirut station chief/political officer at the U.S. Embassy, won CIA's Distinguished Intelligence Cross, kidnapped by the group Hezbollah in March 1984
- Francis E. Quinlan, U.S. Marine Corps general
- Robert Reimann, retired U.S. Navy rear admiral

=== Law ===
- Ivan Fisher (LAW '68) – white-collar lawyer, The New York Times listed him in the top five of criminal attorneys in New York City
- Francis Lee Bailey (LAW '60) – considered one of the greatest lawyers of the 20th century, attorney for O. J. Simpson, part of the "Dream Team", "Boston Strangler" suspect Albert DeSalvo, heiress Patty Hearst's trial for bank robberies, Ernest Medina for the My Lai Massacre

=== Other ===
- Nick Fuentes – far-right political commentator; dropped out after completing his freshman year
- Tipper Gore (CAS '70) – 33rd Second Lady of the United States
- J. Howard McGrath (LAW '29) – chair of the Democratic National Committee (see U.S. governors)
- Hadassah Lieberman (CAS '70) – wife of U.S. Senator Joseph Lieberman
- John Sasso (CAS '70) – Democratic political operative who ran the 1988 presidential election bid by nominee Michael Dukakis
- Joe Solmonese (COM '87) – president of the Human Rights Campaign, chief executive officer of EMILY's List, CEO of the 2020 Democratic National Convention
- Markos Moulitsas Zúniga (JD) – founder of Daily Kos, largest liberal political blog in the US
- Richard Sugarman (GRS '76) – philosopher, advisor to presidential candidate Bernie Sanders on his 2016 presidential campaign

== Other ==
- Warren Adelson (born 1942) – art dealer and author
- Doris Holmes Blake – entomologist
- Anthony W. Case (Ph.D., 2009; born 1980) – developed devices used to measure solar wind on Parker Solar Probe and other uncrewed spacecraft
- James Richard Cocke (MD; 1863–1900) – physician, homeopath, pioneer hypnotherapist; first blind medical graduate
- DeWitt Sanford Dykes Sr. (SMT; 1903–1991) – architect, Methodist minister
- Carolyn Bartlett Gast, scientific illustrator
- Dave Gilbert (BA, 1998) - Founder of Wadjet Eye Games.
- William W. Happ (PhD) – silicon transistor pioneer at Shockley Semiconductor Laboratory, and professor at Arizona State University
- Rikki Klieman (JD LAW 1975) – attorney, TV personality, Court TV, named by Time magazine as one of the five best female attorneys in the United States in 1983
- Frederick S. Pardee – former economics researcher at the RAND Corporation, real estate investor in Los Angeles, California, philanthropist
- Mark Rosewater – Magic: The Gathering head designer
- Earle G. Shettleworth Jr. – state historian of Maine
- Dawn Steel (did not graduate) – first woman to run a major Hollywood studio (deceased)
- Trish Vradenburg – playwright, author, television writer, and Alzheimer's advocate
- Kate Vrijmoet – artist
- Mark Manson – self-help author, blogger and entrepreneur
- Warren A. Cole – founder of Lambda Chi Alpha, one of the largest social fraternities in the US
- Susan Heitler – clinical psychologist

== Sports ==
=== Hockey ===
==== U.S. Hockey Hall of Fame ====
- Tony Amonte
- Jim Craig*
- Mike Eruzione*
- Jack Garrity
- Jack Kelley
- Jack O'Callahan*
- Jack Parker
- Dave Silk*
- Keith Tkachuk
- Scott Young

*Craig, Eruzione, O'Callahan and Silk were inducted as members of the 1980 Winter Olympics hockey team, known as the 'Miracle on Ice.

==== U.S. Olympians ====
This is a list of Boston University alumni who have played on an Olympic team.

Name	Position	BU tenure	Team	Year	Finish
Gordon Smith	Forward		USA	1932, 1936	Silver, bronze
Paul Rowe	Forward	1932–1935	USA	1936	Bronze
John Lax	Forward	1932–1935	USA	1936	Bronze
Jack Garrity	Forward	1949–1951	USA	1948	DQ
Joseph Czarnota	Forward	1948–1951	USA	1952	Silver
Don Rigazio	Goaltender		USA	1956	Silver
Richard Rodenhiser	Forward	1951–1953	USA	1956, 1960	Silver, gold
Olivier Prechac	Forward	1970–1971	France	1968	11th
Tim Regan	Goaltender	1969–1972	USA	1972	Silver
Herb Wakabayashi	Forward	1966–1969	Japan	1972, 1976, 1980	9th, 9th, 12th
Dick Lamby	Defenseman	1976–1978	USA	1976	5th
Dick Decloe	Defenseman	1972–1973	Netherlands	1980	9th
Mike Eruzione	Left wing	1973–1977	USA	1980	Gold
Jim Craig	Goaltender	1976–1979	USA	1980	Gold
Jack O'Callahan	Defenseman	1975–1979	USA	1980	Gold
Dave Silk	Right wing	1976–1979	USA	1980	Gold
Grant Goegan	Left wing	1978–1980	Italy	1984	9th
Scott Young	Right wing	1985–1987	USA	1988, 1992, 2002	7th, 4th, silver
Clark Donatelli	Center	1984–1987	USA	1988, 1992	7th, 4th
Scott Lachance	Defenseman	1990–1991	USA	1992	4th
Shawn McEachern	Left wing	1988–1991	USA	1992	4th
Joe Sacco	Right wing	1987–1990	USA	1992	4th
Keith Tkachuk	Right wing	1990–1991	USA	1992, 1998, 2002, 2006	4th, 6th, silver, 8th
David Quinn	Defenseman	1984–1988	USA	1992	†
Adrian Aucoin	Defenseman	1991–1992	Canada	1994	Silver
John Lilley	Right wing	1991–1993	USA	1994	4th
David Sacco	Center	1988–1993	USA	1994	8th
Tony Amonte	Right wing	1989–1991	USA	1998, 2002	6th, silver
Chris Drury	Left wing	1994–1998	USA	2002, 2006, 2010	Silver, 8th, silver
Tom Poti	Defenseman	1996–1998	USA	2002	Silver
Rick DiPietro	Goaltender	1999–2000	USA	2006	8th
Ryan Whitney	Defenseman	2001–2004	USA	2010	Silver
Kevin Shattenkirk	Defenseman	2007–2010	USA	2014	4th
Chris Bourque	Left wing	2004–2005	USA	2018	7th
Jordan Greenway	Left wing	2015–2018	USA	2018	7th
Matt Gilroy	Defenseman	2005–2009	USA	2018	7th
John McCarthy	Left wing	2005–2009	USA	2018	7th
David Warsofsky	Defenseman	2008–2011	USA	2022	5th
Drew Commesso	Goaltender	2020–present	USA	2022	5th

==== U.S. National Hockey League ====
Head coaches in the NHL

- David Quinn, head coach, San Jose Sharks (2022–2024); head coach, New York Rangers (2018–2021)
- Mike Sullivan, head coach, Pittsburgh Penguins (2015–2025), only American-born coach to win the Stanley Cup more than once

In total, 92 former Terriers have made the NHL, with John Aiken being the first in 1957 and Shane Bowers being the most recent.

Player	Position	Team(s)	Years	Stanley Cups
John Aiken	Goaltender	MTL	1957–1958	0
Paul O'Neil	Center	VAN, BOS	1973–1975	0
Bob Gryp	Forward	BOS, WAS	1973–1976	0
Ron Anderson	Right wing	WAS	1974–1975	0
Ken Kuzyk	Right wing	CLE	1976–1978	0
Mike Fidler	Left wing	CLE, MNS, HFD, CHI	1976–1983	0
Dick Lamby	Defenseman	STL	1978–1981	0
Dick Lamby	Defenseman	STL	1978–1981	0
John Bethel	Left wing	WIN	1979–1980	0
Jim Craig	Goaltender	ATF, BOS, MNS	1979–1984	0
Dave Silk	Right wing	NYR, BOS, DET, WIN	1979–1986	0
Rick Meagher	Center	MTL, HFD, NJD, STL	1979–1991	0
Bill Whelton	Defenseman	WIN	1980–1981	0
Paul Miller	Center	COR	1981–1982	0
Jack O'Callahan	Defenseman	CHI, NJD	1982–1989	0
Tom O'Regan	Center	PIT	1983–1986	0
Cleon Daskalakis	Goaltender	BOS	1984–1987	0
Paul Fenton	Left wing	HFD, NYR, LAK, WIN, TOR, CGY, SJS	1984–1992	0
Dale Dunbar	Defenseman	VAN, BOS	1985–1989	0
Scott Shaunessy	Defenseman	QUE	1986–1989	0
Jim Ennis	Defenseman	EDM	1987–1988	0
Scott Young	Right wing	HFD, PIT, QUE, COL, ANA, STL, DAL	1987–2006	2
John Cullen	Center	PIT, HFD, TOR, TBL	1988–1999	0
Clark Donatelli	Center	MNS, BOS	1989–1992	0
Joe Sacco	Right wing	TOR, ANA, NYI, WSH, PHI	1990–2003	0
Tony Amonte	Right wing	NYR, CHI, PHO, PHI, CGY	1990–2007	0
Peter Ahola	Defenseman	LAK, PIT, NYR, SJS, CGY	1991–1994	0
Dave Tomlinson	Center	TOR, WIN, FLA	1991–1995	0
Ed Ronan	Left wing	MTL, WIN, BUF	1991–1997	1
Mike Sullivan	Center	SJS, CGY, BOS, PHO	1991–2002	2†
Scott Lachance	Right wing	NYI, MTL, VAN, CBJ	1991–2004	0
Shawn McEachern	Left wing	PIT, LAK, BOS, OTT, ATL	1991–2006	1
Keith Tkachuk	Left wing	WIN, PHO, STL, ATL	1991–2010	0
John Lilley	Right wing	ANA	1993–1996	0
John Lilley	Right wing	ANA	1993–1996	0
David Sacco	Center	TOR, ANA	1993–1996	0
Adrian Aucoin	Defenseman	VAN, TBL, NYI, CHI, CGY, PHO, CBJ	1994–2013	0
Phil Von Stefenelli	Defenseman	BOS, OTT	1995–1997	0
Nick Vachon	Center	NYI	1996–1997	0
Rich Brennan	Defenseman	COL, SJS, NYR, LAK, NSH, BOS	1996–2003	0
Chris O'Sullivan	Defenseman	CGY, VAN, ANA	1996–2003	0
Mike Grier	Right wing	EDM, WAS, BUF, SJS	1996–2011	0
Jay Pandolfo	Left wing	NJD, NYI, BOS	1996–2013	2
Doug Friedman	Left wing	EDM, NSH	1997–1999	0
Shawn Bates	Center	BOS, NYI	1997–2008	0
Dan Lacouture	Left wing	EDM, PIT, NYR, BOS, NJD, CAR	1998–2009	0
Dan Lacouture	Left wing	EDM, PIT, NYR, BOS, NJD, CAR	1998–2009	0
Chris Drury	Left wing	COL, CGY, BUF, NYR	1998–2011	1
Tom Poti	Defenseman	EDM, NYR, NYI, WAS	1998–2013	0
Michel Larocque	Goaltender	CHI	2000–2001	0
Michel Larocque	Goaltender	CHI	2000–2001	0
Rick DiPietro	Goaltender	NYI	2000–2013	0
Chris Kelleher	Defenseman	BOS	2001–2002	0
Joe DiPenta	Defenseman	ATL, ANA	2002–2008	1
Mike Pandolfo	Left wing	NJD	2003–2004	0
Carl Corazzini	Right wing	BOS, CHI	2003–2007	0
Freddy Meyer	Defenseman	PHI, NYI, PHO, ATL	2003–2011	0
Ryan Whitney	Defenseman	PIT, ANA, EDM, FLA	2005–2014	0
Chris Bourque	Left wing	WAS, PIT, BOS	2007–2013	0
John Curry	Goaltender	PIT, MIN	2008–2015	0
David Van der Gulik	Left wing	CGY, COL, LAK	2008–2015	0
Matt Gilroy	Defenseman	NYR, TBL, OTT, FLA	2009–2014	0
Brandon Yip	Right wing	COL, NSH, PHO	2009–2014	0
John McCarthy	Left wing	SJS	2009–2016	0
Colin Wilson	Center	NSH, COL	2009–2020	0
Colby Cohen	Defenseman	COL	2010–2011	0
Brian Strait	Defenseman	PIT, NYI, WPG	2010–2017	0
Eric Gryba	Defenseman	OTT, EDM, NJD	2012–2019	0
David Warsofsky	Defenseman	BOS, PIT, NJD, COL	2013–2018	0
Adam Clendening	Defenseman	CHI, VAN, PIT, EDM, NYR, ARI, CBJ	2014–2019	0
Matt O'Connor	Goaltender	OTT	2015–2016	0
Jakob Forsbacka Karlsson	Center	BOS	2016–2019	0
Wade Megan	Center	STL, DET	2016–2019	0
Danny O'Regan	Center	SJS, BUF	2016–2022	0
David Farrance	Defenseman	NSH	2020–2021	0
Nick Bonino	Center	ANA, VAN, PIT, NSH, MIN, SJS	2009–present	2
Kevin Shattenkirk	Defenseman	COL, STL, WAS, NYR, TBL, ANA	2010–present	1
Alex Chiasson	Right wing	DAL, OTT, CGY, WAS, EDM, VAN, DET	2012–present	0
Charlie Coyle	Center	MIN, BOS	2012–present	0
Matt Nieto	Left wing	SJS, COL	2013–present	0
Jack Eichel	Center	BUF, VGK	2015–present	1
Evan Rodrigues	Left wing	BUF, PIT, COL	2015–present	0
Matt Grzelcyk	Defenseman	BOS	2016–present	0
A. J. Greer	Left wing	COL, NJD, BOS	2016–present	0
Clayton Keller	Center	ARI	2016–present	0
Charlie McAvoy	Defenseman	BOS	2016–present	0
Jordan Greenway	Left wing	MIN, BUF	2017–present	0
Dante Fabbro	Defenseman	NSH	2018–present	0
Brady Tkachuk	Left wing	OTT	2018–present	0
Brady Tkachuk	Left wing	OTT	2018–present	0
Joel Farabee	Left wing	PHI	2019–present	0
Jake Oettinger	Goaltender	DAL	2019–present	0
Kieffer Bellows	Left wing	NYI, PHI	2019–present	0
Trevor Zegras	Center	ANA	2020–present	0
Max Willman	Center	PHI	2021–present	0
Alex Vlasic	Defenseman	CHI	2021–present	0
Shane Bowers	Center	COL	2022–present	0
Macklin Celebrini	Center	SJS	2024–present	0

The Terriers have had 23 players who were chosen in the first round of the NHL entry draft, as of the 2024–2025 season:

- Rick DiPietro – 2000, 1st overall
- Macklin Celebrini – 2024, 1st overall
- Jack Eichel – 2015, 2nd overall
- Scott Lachance – 1991, 4th overall
- Brady Tkachuk – 2018, 4th overall
- Ryan Whitney – 2002, 5th overall
- Colin Wilson – 2008, 7th overall
- Clayton Keller – 2016, 7th overall
- Trevor Zegras – 2019, 9th overall
- Tyler Boucher – 2021, 10th overall
- Scott Young – 1986, 11th overall
- David Quinn – 1984, 13th overall
- Kevin Shattenkirk – 2007, 14th overall
- Joel Farabee – 2018, 14th overall
- Charlie McAvoy – 2016, 14th overall
- Dante Fabbro – 2016, 17th overall
- Keith Tkachuk – 1990, 19th overall
- Kieffer Bellows – 2016, 19th overall
- Jay O'Brien – 2018, 19th overall
- Jeff Kealty – 1994, 22nd overall
- Jake Oettinger – 2017, 26th overall
- Charlie Coyle – 2010, 28th overall
- Shane Bowers – 2017, 28th overall

=== Other athletes ===
- Carl Adams – current wrestling coach; three-time NCAA All-American, two-time National Champion at 158 lb
- Harry Agganis – professional baseball player
- Tunji Awojobi (born 1973) – Nigerian former professional basketball player
- Raja Bell (transferred to Florida International University) – former NBA basketball player
- Rocco Benetton – former chief executive of the Benetton Formula One team (also in Business)
- Cindy Blodgett – former WNBA player, assistant basketball coach
- Brett Brown – basketball coach
- Thomas Burke (Law LL.B. 1897) – Olympic champion
- Butch Byrd – professional football player
- Gerardo Mauricio Chavez Montaño (CAS '02) – president and general manager of Bomberos de Mexicali, Club de Basquetbol, of Mexico's CIBACOPA League
- Mickey Cochrane – Hall of Fame baseball player
- Glenn Consor (BS '80) – sports broadcaster, radio color commentary for FM 106.7 Washington Wizards broadcasts; started four years for Rick Pitino on BU basketball team
- Dave DeGuglielmo (WED; BS '90, EdM '91) – former NCAA football coach, professional football coach
- Andy Dorman – Major League Soccer soccer player
- Tom Dwan (no degree) – professional poker player
- Michael Emenalo (CAS BA 1989) – member of Nigeria's 1994 World Cup soccer team
- Mike Eruzione – captain, 1980 U.S. Olympic Hockey Team
- Dick Farley – College Football Hall of Fame coach
- Paul Farren – former NFL player, Cleveland Browns 1983–91
- Foge Fazio – NCAA football coach, NFL football coach
- Michael Felger – sportswriter for the Boston Herald; sports radio talk show host
- Keith Francis (MA) – Senior Intelligence Analyst, ATF, world-class track athlete
- Tony Gaffney (born 1984) – basketball player in the Israeli Basketball Premier League
- Sheila Ford Hamp – owner of the Detroit Lions
- David Hemery (BA) – won 400 metres hurdles at the 1968 Summer Olympics in Mexico City, won first ever British Superstars competition
- Bill Herrion – NCAA basketball coach
- Karl Hobbs – NCAA basketball coach
- John Holland (born 1988) – American-Puerto Rican basketball player for Hapoel Tel Aviv of the Israeli Basketball Premier League
- Rick Hoyt – triathlete
- Mike Jarvis – NCAA basketball coach
- Jim "Crash" Jensen – former NFL football player
- İrem Karamete (born 1993) – Turkish Olympic fencer
- Robyn Kenney – Team USA field hockey
- Steven Key – WNBA's Chicago Sky head coach/general manager
- Zsolt Limperger – Hungarian football player
- Jeffrey Lurie – owner of the Philadelphia Eagles, former professor, BU
- Kelvin Madzongwe – current Zimbabwean international footballer
- Charlie McAvoy – current NHL player
- Shawn McEachern – retired NHL hockey player
- John McKinlay – BU crew captain, two-time Olympian, rowing, 1952 Helsinki Finland, 1956 Melbourne Australia silver medalist
- Kevin Murphy – 1st Team Associated Press 1-AA Football All-American, former arena football player
- Jack Parker – Boston University hockey coach
- Gary Plummer – NBA player
- Marie-Philip Poulin – member of Canadian Women's Olympic Hockey Team; two-time Olympic gold medalist
- Mary Pratt – women's professional baseball player, Rockford Peaches ("A League of Their Own")
- Reggie Rucker – former NFL player
- Peter Schifrin (born 1958) – Olympic fencer and sculptor
- Dave Silk – 1980 U.S. Olympic hockey team
- John Thomas – high jump world record holder
- Jennifer Wakefield – member of Canadian Women's Olympic Hockey Team; Olympic gold medalist
- Catherine Ward – member of Canadian Women's Olympic Hockey Team; two-time Olympic gold medalist
- Tara Watchorn – member of Canadian Women's Olympic Hockey Team; Olympic gold medalist
- Maurice Watson (born 1993) – basketball player for Maccabi Rishon LeZion of the Israeli Basketball Premier League

== Notable faculty members ==
=== Nobel laureates ===
- Saul Bellow – 1976 Nobel Prize for Literature (deceased)
- Sheldon Glashow – 1979 Nobel Prize in Physics
- Louise Glück – 2020 Nobel Prize in Literature (2008–2011)
- Martin Luther King Jr. – 1964 Nobel Peace Prize (deceased)
- Osamu Shimomura – 2008 Nobel Prize in Chemistry
- Daniel C. Tsui – 1998 Nobel Prize in Physics
- Derek Walcott – 1992 Nobel Prize for Literature; fellow, MacArthur Foundation
- Elie Wiesel – 1986 Nobel Peace Prize (deceased)

=== Fulbright Scholars ===
- Anne Donahue
- Robert Neffson

=== Guggenheim Fellows ===
- Theodore Antoniou – composer; professor of music; 1978
- David Aronson – painter; emeritus professor of art; 1960
- Saul Bellow – novelist; University Professor; 1948 and 1955
- Alicia Borinsky – professor of Latin American and comparative literature; 2001 Latin American and Caribbean Fellow
- Robert V. Bruce – professor emeritus of History; 1957
- Charles Capper – professor of history; 1994
- Bonnie Costello – William Fairfield Warren Distinguished Professor of English; 1990
- Robert Dallek – professor of history; 1973
- Norman Dello Joio – composer; university professor and professor emeritus of music; 1944 and 1945
- Leslie D. Epstein – director, Creative Writing Program; 1977
- Thomas F. Glick – professor of history; 1987
- Gennady Gorelik – research fellow, Center for Philosophy and History of Science; 1995 US and Canadian Fellow
- Josephine Halvorson – College of Fine Arts professor of art and chair of graduate studies in painting; 2021
- Jaakko Hintikka – professor of philosophy; 1987
- Caroline A. Jones – associate professor of Art History; 1999 US and Canadian Fellow
- Howard Clark Kee – William Goodwin Aurelio Professor Emeritus of Biblical Studies; 1966
- Ibram X. Kendi – author, director of Center for Antiracist Research; 2019
- Nancy Kopell – professor of mathematics; 1984
- Leonid A. Levin – professor of computer science; 1993
- Ralph Lombreglia – instructor in Creative Writing; 1996 US and Canadian Fellow
- Debraj Ray – former professor of economics; 1997 US and Canadian Fellow
- Maureen Raymo – research associate professor of earth sciences; 2003 US and Canadian Fellow
- Abner Shimony – emeritus professor of philosophy and physics; 1972 US and Canadian Fellow
- Murad Taqqu – professor of mathematics; 1987

=== MacArthur Fellows ===
- Jim Collins – fellow, MacArthur Foundation, professor of biomedical engineering
- Nancy Kopell – fellow, MacArthur Foundation, professor of mathematics

=== Rhodes Scholars ===
- Jim Collins – Rhodes Scholar, professor of biomedical engineering
- Michael Hasselmo – Rhodes Scholar, professor of psychology
- Jon Westling – Rhodes Scholar, former president of Boston University

=== Film, performing arts, television, radio ===
- Julia Child – cooking show host (deceased)
- Harold Dorschug – radio engineer, former faculty member (deceased)
- Simon Estes – operatic bass-baritone
- Mark Fergus – screenwriter, director
- Lukas Foss – composer and conductor (deceased)
- Andrea Kremer – multiple Emmy Award winning sports journalist
- Leslie Parnas – cellist (deceased)
- Sumner Redstone – media mogul
- Roman Totenberg – violinist (deceased)
- Paul Ulanowsky – pianist
- Roger Voisin – principal trumpet, Boston Symphony Orchestra (deceased)
- John Walker – painter
- Bob Zelnick – former ABC News correspondent, author

=== Other ===
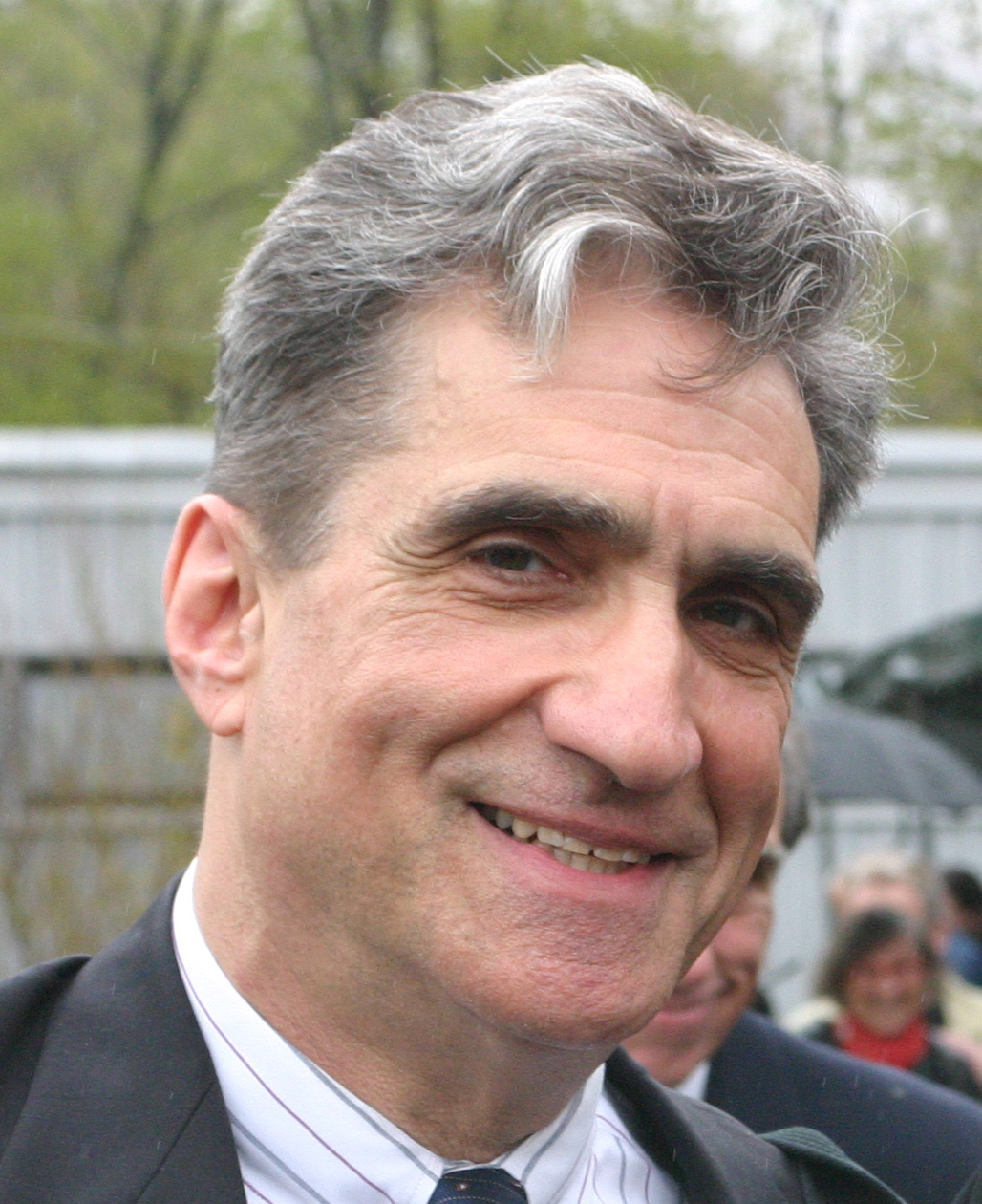
Robert Pinsky, US Poet Laureate (1997–2000)

- Isaac Asimov – author, best known for his work in writing science and science fiction (deceased)
- Warren Ault – Huntington professor of history
- Andrew Bacevich – historian, writer
- Randy Barnett
- Alexander Graham Bell – professor, inventor of the telephone (deceased)
- Peter L. Berger – contemporary sociologist and theologian (deceased)
- Zvi Bodie – professor
- Belinda Borrelli – professor and director of the Center for Behavioral Science Research.
- Borden Parker Bowne – professor of philosophy, 1876–1910
- Gerald Warner Brace – professor of English; writer known for his novels, fiction and literary works
- Lewis E. Braverman – chief of endocrinology 1999–2017
- Robert A. Brown – fellow, American Academy of Arts and Sciences; National Academy of Sciences, current Boston University president
- Robert V. Bruce – winner of the 1988 Pulitzer Prize for History (deceased)
- Kathryn Burak – director of the Writing Program in the College of Communications
- Caroline Walker Bynum – fellow, American Academy of Arts and Sciences
- Milič Čapek (1909–1997) – philosopher
- Ray Carney – film theorist
- John Cheever
- Aram Chobanian – Lifetime Achievement Award, American Heart Association, former Boston University president
- John T. Clarke – professor of astronomy
- Robert Dallek – author, historian, Bancroft Prize winner
- Roberta L. DeBiasi, M.D. – head of the Division of Pediatric Diseases at Children's National Hospital
- Charles DeLisi – Presidential Citizens Medal recipient; Smithsonian Platinum Technology 21st Century Pioneer Partnership Laureate; Arthur G B Metcalf Professor of Science and Engineering
- Mildred S. Dresselhaus – fellow, American Academy of Arts and Sciences; National Academy of Sciences; National Academy of Engineering
- Nancy Halliday Ely-Raphel – former associate dean, Boston University School of Law
- Leslie Epstein
- Edward Fredkin
- Henry Giroux – founding theorist of critical pedagogy in the United States
- Robert Hess (1938–1994) – president of Brooklyn College
- Geoffrey Hill – fellow, American Academy of Arts and Sciences
- Gene Andrew Jarrett – professor of English and African American studies
- Ha Jin – author, National Book Award winner, Faulkner Award winner, Hemingway Award winner
- Michelle Johnson – journalist and associate professor at the College of Communication
- Sir Hans Kornberg – fellow, American Academy of Arts and Sciences; National Academy of Sciences
- Thomas Kunz – fellow, American Academy of Arts and Sciences
- Richard Landes – historian, director of the Center for Millennial Studies
- Calvin B. T. Lee – dean of the College of Liberal Arts 1968–1970, acting president 1970–1971, executive vice president 1971–1971
- Loretta Lees – urban geographer and director of the Initiative on Cities
- Leonid Levin – co-discoverer of NP-completeness
- Robert J. McShea
- Adil Najam – dean, Frederick S. Pardee School of Global Studies
- S. Hamid Nawab – professor of electrical and computer engineering, co-author of Signals and Systems
- Father Norman O'Connor (1921–2003) – former BU Catholic chaplain, jazz aficionado, writer, radio and TV show host
- Merav Opher – astronomer, director of the SHIELD DRIVE Science Center
- Patrice Oppliger – assistant professor of Communication and media consultant on popular culture
- Robert Pinsky – former U.S. Poet Laureate
- Paul Rosenstein-Rodan – pioneer of postwar development economics
- Anne Sexton – poet (deceased)
- Barbara Shinn-Cunningham (born 1964) – professor of biomedical engineering at BU
- Batu Siharulidze – prominent artist, known for his figurative sculptures
- John Silber – former president
- Whitney Smith – vexillologist
- Susanne Sreedhar – assistant professor of philosophy
- Charles R Stith – U.S. ambassador to Tanzania 1998–2001
- Merlin Swartz – scholar of religion
- Shanghua Teng – professor of computer science at Boston University; winner of Gödel Prize
- Shari Thurer – adjunct associate professor in psychology
- Georgia Warnke – distinguished professor of philosophy; director of the Center for Ideas & Society at the University of California, Riverside
- Rosanna Warren – fellow, American Academy of Arts and Sciences
- David Wiggins – fellow, American Academy of Arts and Sciences
- Howard Zinn – historian, political activist, best selling author
- Markos Moulitsas Zuniga – founder and main author of Daily Kos
