= List of Kate Plus 8 episodes =

American reality TV show

Kate Plus 8 (formerly Jon & Kate Plus 8) is an American reality television series starring the Gosselin family. The show premiered on the Discovery Health Channel on April 10, 2007. After two seasons, the series moved to TLC. Following the Gosselins' divorce in 2009, the final episode of Jon & Kate Plus 8 aired on November 23, 2009. The show subsequently returned as Kate Plus 8.

== Series overview ==
Series	Season	Episodes	Originally released	
Series	Season	Episodes	First released	Last released
Jon & Kate Plus 8
2007 - 2009	1	8	April 10, 2007	May 14, 2007
2007 - 2009	2	12	October 15, 2007	December 17, 2007
2007 - 2009	3	32	January 7, 2008	June 16, 2008
2007 - 2009	4	41	June 23, 2008	March 23, 2009
2007 - 2009	5	23	May 25, 2009	November 23, 2009
Kate Plus 8
2010 - 2017	1	8	August 30, 2010	September 20, 2010
2010 - 2017	2	16	April 4, 2011	September 12, 2011
2010 - 2017	3	8	January 13, 2015	February 10, 2015
2010 - 2017	4	8	December 8, 2015	January 26, 2016
2010 - 2017	5	7	November 22, 2016	January 10, 2017
2010 - 2017	6	3	July 10, 2017	July 24, 2017

== Jon & Kate Plus 8 episodes ==
=== Season 1 (2007) ===
No. overall	No. in season	Title	Original release date
1	1	"10 Little Pumpkins"	January 30, 2007
The first season kicks off with the Gosselins' day at the pumpkin patch. They each get a pumpkin of their own, and they carve them for Halloween.
2	2	"Twins Turn 6"	February 7, 2007
Jon and Kate take Cara and Mady to American Girl in New York City for their 6th birthday. The Gosselins also attend a reunion for the Neonatal Intensive Care Unit (NICU), in which the sextuplets spent the first few weeks of their lives.
3	3	"Gosselins Go West"	February 14, 2007
Jon and Kate are invited to speak at a church in California with Mady and Cara. They also prepare their will.
4	4	"Garage Makeover"	February 21, 2007
Jon begins to remodel their garage, but the kids' need of attention proves challenging.
5	5	"Housekeeper Hunt"	February 28, 2007
Kate tries to find a housekeeper that meets her cleaning standards.
6	6	"Shopping For Ten"	March 19, 2007
Jon and Kate share their shopping strategies for a family of ten, including grocery shopping and Christmas shopping.
7	7	"Pancakes and Potties"	March 26, 2007
The Gosselins have their Saturday pancake breakfast. Later, they begin to potty train the little girls.
8	8	"Jon Turns 30"	April 2, 2007
The first season concludes with Kate surprising Jon on his 30th birthday with a trip to Key West, Florida.

=== Season 2 (2007) ===
* One-hour episode.

No. overall	No. in season	Title	Original release date
9	1	"Sextuplets Turn 3!!"	October 15, 2007
The sextuplets' third birthday is celebrated, with Jon and Kate planning a big carnival themed birthday party.
10	2	"Breakfast in Bed"	October 15, 2007
Jon and the kids prepare Mother's Day breakfast in bed for Kate. Later, Kate joins her best friend Beth Carson at the spa for some relaxation on Mother's Day.
11	3	"Gosselins Go Dutch"	October 22, 2007
The Gosselins go to Dutch Wonderland, an amusement park, but the day has some bumps in the road, including an upset Mady and stubborn sextuplets.
12	4	"Sextuplets First Dentist Visit"	October 29, 2007
The sextuplets visit the dentist for the first time, and meltdowns are expected.
13	5	"Red, White & Gosselin"	November 5, 2007
It's the 4th of July and the Gosselins go to a parade and have a picnic lunch in the park. Later, they take a swim at Beth's and Bob's, only the weather doesn't hold out.
14	6	"Sugar Rush"	November 12, 2007
Kate takes the kids to Chocolate World while Jon has to work.
15	7	"A Cow Purchase"	November 19, 2007
The Gosselins take a trip to Natural Acres, where Kate buys half a cow.
16	8	"Sara Snow Visits!"	November 19, 2007
Discovery Health's Sara Snow visits the Gosselins to help Jon, Kate and the kids to eat and live healthier and greener.
17	9	"Babies and Bedrooms (Part 1)"	November 26, 2007
The Gosselins renovate their attic into a new room for Mady and Cara.
18	10	"Babies and Bedrooms (Part 2)"	November 26, 2007
This episode was the continuation of *Episode 17.
19	11*	"Hit the Road"	December 10, 2007
The Gosselins drive 19 hours to the most magical place on earth: Disney World.
20	12*	"Cutting Room Floor"	December 15, 2007
Never before seen clips from the family.

=== Season 3 (2008) ===
* One-hour episode.

No. overall	No. in season	Title	Original release date
21	1	"Trip To The Zoo"	January 7, 2008
The Gosselin kids take a trip to the Pittsburgh Zoo to learn about the animals.
22	2	"Day in the Life"	January 7, 2008
A look at the day in the life of the Gosselins. The twins are at school, Jon is at work and Kate is left at home with the sextuplets.
23	3	"Twins Turn 7"	January 14, 2008
The twins turn seven and Jon and Kate plan a dinner out for the family to celebrate.
24	4	"Kate Hires a Nanny"	January 14, 2008
Kate goes through the process of hiring a nanny that can handle her large family.
25	5	"Potty Training the Boys"	January 21, 2008
Jon and Kate potty train the boys. Later, Kate takes Collin and Leah to the eye doctor.
26	6	"Winter Preparation"	January 21, 2008
Kate reorganizes the house in order to give the kids more room to play, and more space for their things.
27	7	"Family Photo Shoot"	January 28, 2008
The family prepares to shoot their annual family photo.
28	8	"Kate's Wardrobe Makeover"	February 4, 2008
Jon and Kate have a night to themselves so Kate can pick out a new wardrobe and Jon can get a new suit.
29	9	"Behind the Scenes of Jon & Kate Plus 8"	February 11, 2008
Taking a look behind the scenes of the production of Jon & Kate Plus 8.
30	10	"Gosselin Family Christmas"	February 18, 2008
It's Christmas time for the Gosselins. This includes baking cookies, making a gingerbread house, caroling and opening presents.
31	11	"Plane Ride to Utah"	February 25, 2008
The Gosselins head to the airport for their ski trip in Utah, but some complications arise and the kids get rowdy.
32	12	"Viewer F.A.Q."	February 25, 2008
Jon and Kate answer viewer e-mails and questions.
33	13*	"Gosselins Go Skiing"	March 3, 2008
The Gosselins are in Utah to go skiing during a family vacation. Jon snowboards, the kids learn to ski and Kate goes to the spa.
34	14	"Twins Get Musical"	March 10, 2008
Cara gets a new piano and Mady gets a new violin. The twins both begin music lessons for their respective instruments and they put on a show for the family.
35	15	"Cooking With the Twins"	March 10, 2008
The twins attend cooking class and bring their recipes home to try with Kate.
36	16	"Carpeting the House"	March 17, 2008
Jon and Kate begin the process of re-carpeting their house.
37	17	"Valentine's Day"	March 17, 2008
The Gosselins celebrate Valentine's Day.
38	18	"Color Me Gosselin"	March 24, 2008
Jon and Kate take the kids to the Crayola Factory to see how crayons are made.
39	19	"Leah and Joel"	March 24, 2008
Jon and Kate give each of the kids a "special day". In this episode, they both bring Leah to Bounce U to bounce around and Jon brings Joel to Hands On House, an interactive museum for kids.
40	20	"Hannah and Aaden"	March 31, 2008
Jon and Kate bring Hannah horse back riding for her "special day", but soon find out how shy she can be. Jon brings Aaden to a dairy farm to see the animals for his "special day".
41	21	"Alexis and Collin"	April 7, 2008
Jon and Kate bring Alexis to a reptile museum for her "special day", and Jon brings Collin to a train museum for his "special day". The rest of the kids are left at Aunt Jodi's and major meltdowns occur.
42	22	"Cara's Day"	April 14, 2008
Cara gets new roller blades and goes rollerblading with Jon for her "special day", while Kate stands on the side lines watching.
43	23	"Mady's Day"	April 14, 2008
Mady gets her ears pierced and lunch, just her and her parents, for her "special day".
44	24	"Games Gosselins Play"	April 21, 2008
Mady and Cara show the viewers the games the Gosselin kids play.
45	25	"Oprah Here We Come"	April 28, 2008
The Gosselins prepare to go to Chicago to be on The Oprah Winfrey Show.
46	26	"Household Chores"	May 5, 2008
Jon and Kate create a chore list for the kids. The little ones don't seem to mind, but the twins have a different view.
47	27	"Gosselins Take the Stage"	May 12, 2008
The kids plan on putting on a talent show, but when Cara & Mady realize the sextuplets don't have talents and can't learn ones quickly, they put on a fashion show for Jon and Kate instead.
48	28*	"Jon & Kate's Special Day"	May 19, 2008
Jon and Kate have their own "special day", where they get their teeth whitened and then go out to dinner.
49	29*	"Memorial Day Picnic"	May 26, 2008
The Gosselins go to church and then head out to the park for a picnic and have ice cream for dinner.
50	30	"Discipline"	June 2, 2008
Jon and Kate discuss disciplining their children.
51	31*	"Jon's Hair Raising Experience"	June 9, 2008
Jon and Kate leave the kids at home with Jodi and Kevin to go to California so Jon can receive a hair transplant.
52	32	"How We Got Here"	June 16, 2008
Jon and Kate tell the story of how they met and share some of the details of their wedding and their lives before the sextuplets were born.

=== Season 4 (2008–09) ===
* One-hour episode.

No. overall	No. in season	Title	Original release date
53	1	"Boys Day Out"	June 23, 2008
Jon takes the boys golfing for a boys day out, while the twins are in school and Kate takes the little girls grocery shopping to buy ingredients for a special snack, Monkey Munch.
54	2*	"Girls Day Out"	June 30, 2008
Kate takes all five girls for a fun day at a paint your own pottery place, while Jon takes the boys to his gym where they learn about exercise while Jon works out.
55	3*	"Gosselin Family Movie Night"	June 30, 2008
The Gosselins spend a Friday night at home watching a movie.
56	4	"Sextuplets Turn 4!"	July 7, 2008
Leah, Joel, Alexis, Collin, Hannah, and Aaden celebrate their fourth birthday by going to a bakery to decorate their own cupcakes, but they have to wait until after supper to eat them.
57	5	"Korean Dinner"	July 14, 2008
Jon decides to teach his kids about their Korean heritage by cooking them a Korean dinner.
58	6	"Embarrassing & Favorite Moments"	July 21, 2008
Jon and Kate remember their embarrassing moments, even ones they wish weren't caught on tape. They also remember some of their favorite moments they've had with their kids.
59	7	"Sunny Day"	July 28, 2008
The Gosselins take a trip to Sesame Place where they get to meet Elmo, Big Bird and other Sesame Street characters.
60	8	"All Aboard"	August 4, 2008
Kate and Jon take the children to see Thomas the Tank Engine at nearby Strasburg Rail Road, where they ride a train pulled by the famous engine in a special event called Day Out with Thomas.
61	9	"Heading South"	August 11, 2008
The Gosselins head south for their summer vacation to North Carolina and along the way look at some potential properties to buy for their next possible home.
62	10	"Wild Horses"	August 11, 2008
Jon and Kate take the kids on a jeep ride as they track wild horses along the beach. Later, a climb up a lighthouse reveals one of them is afraid of heights.
63	11*	"Beach Trip"	August 18, 2008
Jon and Kate take the kids to the beach, hoping it works out better than the sextuplets' first seaside experience at age three, which turned out badly because of cold, windy weather. Then, the kids get swimming lessons. Finally, The kids paint each other with pudding.
64	12*	"July 4th Celebrations"	August 25, 2008
The Gosselins celebrate the Fourth of July in North Carolina as a part of their summer vacation.
65	13	"Kate's Labor Day"	September 1, 2008
Jon & Kate show their sextuplets the NICU where they were born and spent the first few weeks of their lives.
66	14	"Backyard Campout"	September 8, 2008
Jon and Kate decide to go camping in their own back yard. Everyone is excited, but weather might ruin their plans. Since it was raining the sextuplets decided to play the Vtech's V.Motion TV learning system including The Wonder Pets and Mickey Mouse Clubhouse.
67	15	"Sight and Sound"	September 15, 2008
The Gosselins take a trip to the Sight and Sound Theatre in Strasburg, Pa., to see an interactive play depicting the story of Adam and Eve(In The Beginning).
68	16	"More Viewer F.A.Q."	September 29, 2008
Jon & Kate answer more questions from their fans.
69	17	"Picture Perfect"	October 6, 2008
The Gosselins are asked to pose for the front cover of the November issue of Good Housekeeping magazine.
70	18	"Mr. Mom"	October 13, 2008
Jon has to take care of the house and kids while Kate is away for a few days. Can he handle it?
71	19	"Back to School"	October 13, 2008
It's back to school as the twins start second grade and the sextuplets start their first year of preschool.
72	20	"Baseball Game with Daddy"	October 20, 2008
It's a day of ballpark fun when Jon takes Cara and the boys to a Philadelphia Phillies game, where Jon gets to meet his favorite Phillies player, Shane Victorino.
73	21	"Hawaii, Here We Come"	October 27, 2008
Jon, Kate, and the kids prepare for a trip to Hawaii. While they are there, Jon and Kate plan to renew their wedding vows.
74	22	"Legos & Safaris"	November 3, 2008
On the way to Hawaii, the Gosselins make a stop in San Diego, California to visit Legoland, a safari, and the famous San Diego Zoo. Also, find out who is acting up in the plane ride.
75	23*	"Leis & Luaus"	November 10, 2008
Jon, Kate, and their eight finally arrive in Hawaii, where everyone learns about Hawaiian culture and go snorkeling in the Pacific Ocean.
76	24*	"For Better or Worse"	November 17, 2008
After almost ten years of wedded bliss, Jon & Kate renew their wedding vows in Hawaii to show their children that they will always be together.
77	25	"Yard Sale"	November 24, 2008
Jon and Kate hold their annual yard sale, in order to get rid all of the extra junk they've collected over the years, with the proceeds going to the Pediatric Cancer Research.
78	26	"It's a Book!"	December 1, 2008
Jon and Kate take their brood to New York City for the day, while they make the rounds of talk shows to promote their book, Multiple Blessings, and at the same time decide to tour the Big Apple, play in Central Park and then take a carriage ride around the park.
79	27	"Twins Are Mommy For a Day"	December 8, 2008
Jon & Kate let Cara and Mady parent the sextuplets for a day, finding out that it is not easy as it looks.
80	28*	"Giving Back"	December 15, 2008
Jon & Kate use the holidays to give back to the less fortunate, and at the same time, teach their kids about helping others, at St. Jude's Research Hospital, in Memphis, Tennessee.
81	29	"Soup and a Surprise"	January 5, 2009
With such a large family, Jon and Kate always plan for ways to save money and time. On this day, Kate plans to make lots of soup to freeze for the upcoming winter season, but the day does not go quite as she expected. At the end of the day, they have a surprise for the kids.
82	30	"All Smiles"	January 12, 2009
The Sextuplets visit the dentist again, with Jon & Kate hoping for less tears this time, while Cara & Mady visit an orthodontist to see if they need braces.
83	31*	"All You Wanted to Know"	January 19, 2009
For a third time, Jon & Kate answer questions from their viewers about their family and show. This time viewers also have question for the crew.
84	32	"The New House"	January 26, 2009
Jon & Kate take the kids to see their new house, hoping they like it.
85	33	"The Big Move"	February 2, 2009
The Gosselins are on the move again, to a house big enough to hold ten people.
86	34	"Walk in the Woods"	February 9, 2009
While Kate is away in N.Y., Jon takes the kids out to explore the woods near their new house.
87	35	"Home Sweet Home"	February 16, 2009
The Gosselins are now settled in their new home, next is all the unpacking and painting to do.
88	36	"Puppies!"	February 23, 2009
Jon and Kate have an early Christmas present for their kids, they take them to pick out two German Shepherd puppies to add to their family.
89	37	"Bye Old House"	March 2, 2009
The Gosselins go back to their old house, to finalize everything and for one last look at the memories they've created there.
90	38	"Trip to the Vet"	March 9, 2009
The Gosselins' puppies, Shooka and Nala, are very curious, to the point where Nala swallows a stuffed horse and ends up having to go to the veterinarian to have it surgically removed.
91	39	"Slopes, Sleds, and Sesame"	March 16, 2009
Jon and Cara return to Utah to hit the slopes, while Kate stays home with the rest of the kids and takes them to a live show featuring the characters of Sesame Street in Sesame Street Live.
92	40	"B-Ball & More"	March 23, 2009
The Gosselins go to a basketball game and meet The Harlem Globetrotters.
93	41	"Family Outing"	March 23, 2009
First, Kate and the kids make paintings. Then, the Gosselins visit Philadelphia's Please Touch Museum, where the kids learn by touching everything.

=== Season 5 (2009) ===
* One-hour episode.

No. overall	No. in season	Title	Original release date
94	1*	"Turning 5 & The Future!"	May 25, 2009
Jon & Kate talk about how at the end of Season 4, Jon did not want to do another season and what they think their future holds. The sextuplets' fifth birthday is celebrated with a big party.
95	2	"Kate's Birthday Surprise"	June 1, 2009
The Gosselin kids get help from professional baker Duff Goldman of Ace of Cakes, to help them bake a cake as a surprise for Kate's birthday, while Jon is off in Utah for some skiing with friends and a tour of a facility that helps handicapped kids ski and snowboard.
96	3	"Sun, Seashells and Scrapes"	June 1, 2009
Kate and Mady spend some mother-daughter time together in San Diego, while Jon takes care of the other seven kids. Then an emergency happens with the one of little kids, that ends with a trip to the hospital.
97	4	"Bam!"	June 8, 2009
Jon & Kate Plus 8 celebrates their 100th episode with special guest Chef Emeril Lagasse who, gives the Gosselins a cooking lesson and the kids get to make their own meal.
98	5	"Bikes & Trikes"	June 15, 2009
Paul Teutul Sr., Paul Teutul Jr. and Michael Teutul from American Chopper visit the Gosselins to help Jon make his own custom motorcycle. (American Chopper had a crossover episode called: "Jon & Kate Plus 8 Bike".)
99	6*	"Houses & Big Changes"	June 22, 2009
The children are getting their own playhouses, one for Mady, one for Cara, one for the little girls and one for the boys, also Jon and Kate announce that after much discussion they will separate after 10 years.
100	7*	"Jon & Kate Plus 8: The First 10 Years"	June 29, 2009
A look back at the first ten years of Jon & Kate's married life and how they ended up where they are now.
101	8	"Renovations & Vacations"	August 3, 2009
While Jon supervises renovations of a new kitchen, Kate and the kids head to the beach in North Carolina, again, for a vacation and to avoid the stress of it all.
102	9	"Camping Out"	August 3, 2009
Kate decides to take on a "can do" attitude as a single parent, which includes a backyard camp out with her kids.
103	10	"Beach & Kitchen Revival"	August 10, 2009
Kate and the kids return from their beach vacation to the newly renovated kitchen, will Kate like her kitchen's new look?
104	11	"Battleships & Barbers"	August 17, 2009
Still on their beach vacation, Kate take the boys to visit a battleship called U.S.S. North Carolina followed by a visit a barbershop for haircuts. Back home, Jon takes the twins for a day of fun at place where there are video arcades and rope climbing.
105	12*	"Dude Ranch and Dress Up"	August 31, 2009
Kate and the boys go to a Dude Ranch, while Jon stays home and plays dress up with all five girls.
106	13	"Movie & A Catch"	September 14, 2009
Kate has movie night in the backyard and Jon teaches his kids how to fish.
107	14	"Farm to Table"	September 21, 2009
Kate takes the kids on a trip to visit an Amish farmer and friend where she often gets her organic produce, then later plays games at home with her kids.
108	15	"Tea Party"	September 28, 2009
Kate takes the little girls on a carriage ride, and then they go out for tea at a tearoom, to a bead shop to make jewelry, and out to get ice cream, all while they're still on their North Carolina vacation.
109	16	"Time to Organize!"	October 5, 2009
Kate loves to organize things, but with a busy schedule and eight kids, there's no time. So she has an expert organizer, Diane Albright, come in and help them with their messy basement.
110	17	"School Days"	October 12, 2009
Kate is used to having the sextuplets at home when the twins went off to school, so what will she do now that all eight kids are in school?
111	18	"Butterflies & Water Rockets"	October 19, 2009
Kate takes the little girls on a trip to Florida to visit the world's largest butterfly house, while back at home, Jon and the rest of the kids launch water rockets.
112	19*	"You Ask, Kate Answers"	October 26, 2009
Kate answers questions from the viewers again, (this time by herself) on the show's and her future.
113	20*	"Viewers' Top Moments"	November 9, 2009
Kate counts down viewers' favorite moments from the show.
114	21	"Gymnastics and Baseball"	November 16, 2009
Kate signs the children up for gymnastics and Jon takes them to a Reading Phillies minor league baseball game.
115	22	"Never Before Seen"	November 16, 2009
Kate shares never before seen footage from the cutting room floor including her celebrating her 10th wedding anniversary with the children and going on the road for her book tour, Jon attempting to train the dogs, and the family getting passports for a big trip.
116	23*	"It’s a Crazy Life, But It’s Our Life"	November 23, 2009
Jon and Kate talk about the ups and downs of the last few years and recent events in their lives; Kate and the children go to dairy farm and milk cows; Jon takes the sextuplets to visit a firehouse.

== Kate Plus 8 episodes ==
=== Season 1 (2010) ===
* One-hour episode.

No. overall	No. in season	Title	Original release date
117	1*	"6th Birthday Surprise"	June 6, 2010
Another year has flown by for Kate and her adorable kids. The little ones are turning six, and Kate's planning a special birthday filled with exciting celebrations. Will she be able to keep it a surprise or will she crack under the pressure? Kate takes her eight children to Discovery Cove, to celebrate the sextuplets' sixth birthday.
118	2*	"Home Roost"	July 11, 2010
The Gosselin family gets even bigger when Kate decides to get chickens for the family. At the same time, Kate decides to create a list for systems around the house, as a single mom, needs to learn to take care of.
119	3*	"The Big Apple"	August 30, 2010
Kate and the kids head to the big Apple by train. Even though the family has visited New York City before this time they get to experience new and exciting things throughout the city, from Chinatown to Time Square.
120	4	"Pirates, Kites, and Turtles. Oh My!"	September 6, 2010
Following Gosselin family tradition, Kate and the kids head to the beach to soak up the sun. But when inevitable meltdowns happen over room assignments, can Kate keep the kids smiling?
121	5	"A Rough Ride"	September 13, 2010
Mady and Cara tackle the waves by taking a surf lesson, but will Kate join in on the fun? Later the Gosselin family head out to sea for some good deep sea fishing, but will the waters cause everyone to be too sick to fish?
122	6	"School Time!"	September 20, 2010
The Gosselin kids are ready to head back to school and this year the sextuplets are going to kindergarten. They gather all of the needed supplies like uniforms and tennis shoes and even get back to school hair cuts.
123	7*	"Alaska, Here We Come!"	November 7, 2010
Kate and the kids are traveling eight hours to Alaska - their longest trip ever. The Gosselins set out to see huge snow-covered mountains, bright white glaciers and pan for gold, but the excitement builds when they head out to sea in search of whales. (This episode is a prequel to a cross-over in the "Alaskan Hospitality" episode of Sarah Palin's Alaska, which was seen the following month).
124	8*	"Gosselins, Goblins & Ghouls"	November 28, 2010
It's Halloween at the Gosselin household and the kids are more excited than ever. See Kate and the kids pick out costumes, go to the pumpkin patch, and explore their spooked out basement. Kate has one more surprise in store sure to be a scream.

=== Season 2 (2011) ===
* One-hour episode.

No. overall	No. in season	Title	Original release date
125	1*	"Australia Adventure"	April 4, 2011
Kate and the kids travel 21 hours to visit Australia, celebrating New Year's Eve in Sydney. Kate attempts to swim with sharks while inside a cage, and the whole family meets some of Australia's aboriginal people.
126	2*	"Australia Zoo Visit"	April 11, 2011
The Gosselins visit Steve Irwin's Australia Zoo, where the kids have an opportunity to meet unique Australian wildlife and Kate attempts to feed a crocodile.
127	3*	"New Zealand"	April 18, 2011
The Gosselins finish their adventure with a stop to New Zealand, where they meet native animals and Maori people. When the twins decide to Sky Jump from Sky Tower, will Kate be brave enough to follow?
128	4*	"Philly Fun!"	May 2, 2011
Kate and the kids travel across the state to Philadelphia to learn about the history of the city and their nation. They learn about the Liberty Bell, pretend to be sworn in as president and enjoy a local hockey game!
129	5*	"Kate's Night Out"	June 6, 2011
Kate and her best friend Jamie enjoy a night of dinner and dancing in New York City to celebrate Kate's birthday, while at home the kids are making a mess with Ashley.
130	6	"6 Becomes 7!"	June 13, 2011
Kate organizes a pool party to celebrate the sextuplets' seventh birthday. Will she manage to pull it off with only five days to plan?
131	7	"Chicks & Eggs"	June 13, 2011
The Gosselin family celebrates Easter at home by dyeing eggs, decorating their own Easter treats, and finishing off with an Easter egg hunt.
132	8*	"Giving Back"	June 20, 2011
Kate and the kids head to Tennessee where they help out packing food bags, volunteering in a soup kitchen, and participating in a food drive for Feeding America.
133	9*	"Hodge Podge Dinner"	June 27, 2011
The Gosselin kids are taking over the kitchen! They plan and cook their own meal, and later deliver some of their home baked goods to dialysis patients.
134	10	"DC Cupcake Visit"	August 8, 2011
Kate takes Mady and Cara and their two best friends, to visit and bake with the stars of TLC's DC Cupcakes, Sophie and Katherine. Back home with the sextuplets, it's a boys vs. girls summer games competition, with Ashley as their coach. Who will win?
135	11	"8 Movie Makers!"	August 8, 2011
Although the eight Gosselin children are no strangers to being on camera, they have a lot to learn about being behind the camera when making their own movie! Once completed, they take to the red carpet, Hollywood-style, for the premiere of their film.
136	12*	"Kate's Toughest Questions"	August 15, 2011
Kate sits down to answer some of her viewers' toughest questions, from "Is Kate dating again?" to "How many plastic surgeries has she had?"
137	13*	"Treehouse & Chicks"	August 22, 2011
Kate and the kids are working in the yard preparing for their newest addition, baby chicks! Kate discovers her skills as a carpenter as she attempts to build a fence and a swinging barn door. Meanwhile, construction on a new tree house is underway.
138	14*	"RV Trip"	August 29, 2011
The Gosselins, Ashley and Jamie are on the road again, traveling across middle America in an RV for two weeks, and Kate's driving! Witness the family like you've never seen them before, visiting the nation's most beautiful landscapes and attractions.
139	15*	"RV Breakdown"	September 5, 2011
The Gosselins are halfway through their RV road trip and it has been a vacation like no other, full of adventure and drama! When the RVs experience mechanical issues, will Kate finally reach her boiling point? Later, someone decides to leave.
140	16*	"The Finale"	September 12, 2011
Kate and her eight kids have made unforgettable memories over the past seven years of filming. As the show comes to a close, the Gosselins say goodbye to the fans and reminisce about their favorite memories. Also, hear from family friends about their experiences.

=== Season 3 (2015) ===
* One-hour episode.

No. overall	No. in season	Title	Original release date	Viewers (millions)
141	1*	"New England Adventures"	January 13, 2015	1.80
Kate and her eight go on their annual summer vacation trip, this time to New England states. Part of their trip includes a stop at Plimoth Plantation in Massachusetts and then they head to Maine.
142	2*	"Rocking the Boat"	January 20, 2015	1.32
The Gosselins continue their New England summer adventure in Maine, by going lobster trapping, and a day at the beach, followed by their traditional ice cream dinner.
143	3*	"The Room Project"	January 27, 2015	1.73
Cara and Mady are almost fourteen and have decided they each want their own room. So Kate has to figure where to put her six younger kids, to accommodate the twins.
144	4*	"Cleaning House"	February 3, 2015	1.44
Kate has a yard sale, to clean out unused clutter in her house, with the money going to a local animal shelter. Kate states in this episode that she does not put prices on her items, leaving it up to the buyer to decide on what they want to pay. Later on Kate and her eight celebrate the twins' fourteenth birthday.
145	5*	"Kate's Most Memorable Moments"	February 10, 2015	1.44
Kate answers viewers questions and looks back on past episodes, going back to the two original specials and Jon & Kate Plus 8.
146	6*	"Mother's Day Surprise"	May 10, 2015	
For Mother's Day, the kids decide to surprise Kate with breakfast and homemade cards. The day goes off without a hitch and Kate gets to enjoy time with her eight kids.
147	7*	"The BIG Four Oh!"	June 23, 2015	
Kate and the kids take a trip down south to Mexico for Kate's 40th birthday.
148	8*	"Birthday #11"	June 30, 2015	
The Sextuplets turn eleven. This year's birthday is spent overnight at a hotel, with each of the six inviting one friend each, including Cara and Maddy, makes for a total of fourteen kids, plus a friend of Kate's. The birthday plans also include going to a roller rink, eating a local pizza restaurant, followed by a few different cakes, designed by the sextuplets.

=== Season 4 (2015–16) ===
* One-hour episode.

No. overall	No. in season	Title	Original release date	Viewers (millions)
149	1*	"School's Out!"	December 8, 2015	0.955
The Gosselin kids have finished school for the year and the family heads to Florida for their annual summer vacation.
150	2*	"Florida Fun"	December 15, 2015	0.74
Kate and the kids try their hand at deep sea fishing and Cara and Mady search the internet for healthy recipes to use. The family goes to a water park for the very first time and visits Alligator Beach, where Alexis got to be an assistant with her favorite reptile.
151	3*	"What's Old Is New"	December 22, 2015	0.79
Kate and Mady go antiquing to see if they can find some good deals. The family goes to an animal show and compete in a cook off.
152	4*	"Green Thumb Gosselins"	December 29, 2015	1.16
The Gosselin family plants their garden, have a lemonade stand and then do Yoga. They also have a surprise burial to attend.
153	5*	"Deck Party"	January 5, 2016	1.19
Kate throws a party to celebrate the completion of her new deck. Kate and the girls enjoy a day at the spa; and the boys learn magic tricks.
154	6*	"School Prep"	January 12, 2016	1.29
The end of summer means it's time for the kids to go back to school, so Kate takes them shopping for clothes and supplies and they all work together on one more seasonal project.
155	7*	"Blind Date"	January 19, 2016	1.08
Kate decides to try the dating scene again and heads to New York City to go on a blind date. Mady and Cara try to entertain their younger siblings while Kate is away.
156	8*	"Kate's Advice"	January 26, 2016	N/A
Kate looks at episodes of herself from past seasons and talks about how she's changed as a mother and person.

=== Season 5 (2016–17) ===
* One-hour episode.

No. overall	No. in season	Title	Original release date
157	1*	"Sextuplets Turn 12!"	November 22, 2016
Kate plans a scavenger hunt for the sextuplets's 12th birthday, with teams of boys and girls.
158	2*	"New Orleans, Here We Come!"	December 6, 2016
The Gosselins head to New Orleans on vacation where they try the local food and learn about the local culture.
159	3*	"Puppies & Poconos"	December 13, 2016
The family heads to the Poconos for some fun activities. They also adopt two new puppies into their home.
160	4*	"Gosselins in Space"	December 20, 2016
The family visits a space camp in Huntsville, Alabama and pretend to be astronauts and then finish their vacation by going to the beach.
161	5*	"Beach Time!"	December 27, 2016
The family have fun at Orange Beach, Alabama where they go kayaking, parasailing and a family Segway tour. When they return home, the Gosselins try to train their puppies.
162	6*	"Sweet 16"	January 3, 2017
Cara and Mady turn sixteen and plan their party, by themselves. Kate feels nostalgic about their age.
163	7*	"Game Night"	January 10, 2017
Kate and the younger kids have a family game show night, with Mady as their host, which involves them answering questions about past seasons and episodes of their show.

=== Season 6 (2017) ===
* One-hour episode.

No. overall	No. in season	Title	Original release date
164	1*	"A Haunting at the Gosselins"	July 10, 2017
The Gosselins go all out for Halloween with a haunted house party.
165	2*	"Kate Goes Skiing... Sort of..."	July 17, 2017
The family heads to Vermont for a ski trip.
166	3*	"Six Teenagers!"	July 24, 2017
The sextuplets celebrate their thirteenth with the boys camping out and the girls "glamping" out.

== Specials ==
=== Jon & Kate Plus 8 ===
Title	Original release date
"Surviving Sextuplets and Twins"	May 14, 2006
The one-hour special introduces Jon and Kate Gosselin, their twins, Cara and Mady and their sextuplets, Alexis, Hannah, Aaden, Collin, Leah, and Joel.
"Sextuplets and Twins: One Year Later"	January 23, 2007
Cameras follow Jon and Kate, around, one year after their first special, Surviving Sextuplets and Twins. The Gosselins have moved into a new house, and Kate prepares to have a post pregnancy tummy tuck.
"Jon & Kate Plus 8 Go Green!"	April 19, 2009
Jon and Kate help support Earth Day, by making their house safe to the environment, with help from Planet Green's Renovation Nation host Steve Thomas.
"Kate: Her Story"	November 2, 2009
Kate talks with NBC's Today Show correspondent, Natalie Morales about her troubled marriage and divorce, the tabloids and paparazzi, her future and many other topics.

== Specials ==
=== Kate Plus 8 ===
Title	Original release date
"Inside Kate's World"	June 6, 2010
Spouting the mantra of "Kate Clean Slate," the newly single Kate Gosselin has already become a new woman in a matter of months. In this TLC special, see a unique behind-the-scenes glimpse into the daily life of Kate Gosselin.
"Update on the 8"	June 19, 2014
It's been three and a half years since the cameras were last in the Gosselin home and the kids are older and more independent now. In this episode it's Spring Break and Kate has appointments and activities planned for the whole week. She also starts to make plans for the sextuplets' tenth birthday.
"Sextuplets Turn 10"	June 26, 2014
The Sextuplets' tenth birthday has arrived and Kate is re-doing the carnival theme from their third birthday, but a more grown-up version, which includes Cara and Maddy (who are now 13) and their friends running some of the games. The party turns out to be a huge success and at the end the sextuplets' birthday present, from Kate, is a Gator.
"A Decade of Kate"	June 21, 2015
As Kate Gosselin says goodbye to the 30's and hello to the 40's, this three hour special captures her happiest memories and moments on film over the past decade.
"10 Year Anniversary"	November 22, 2016
Kate looks back at the first TV special the Gosselin family did ten years ago and reflects on how things have changed over time.
"College Special"	October 2, 2019
Kate, Maddy and Cara tour colleges in North Carolina, that also includes a family vacation (minus Collin and Hannah), followed by a goodbye supper for the girls before they head off to their separate colleges. Kate looks back on the past eighteen years of their lives, talking about how family members leave.
