= Kate Gosselin =

American television personality (born 1975)

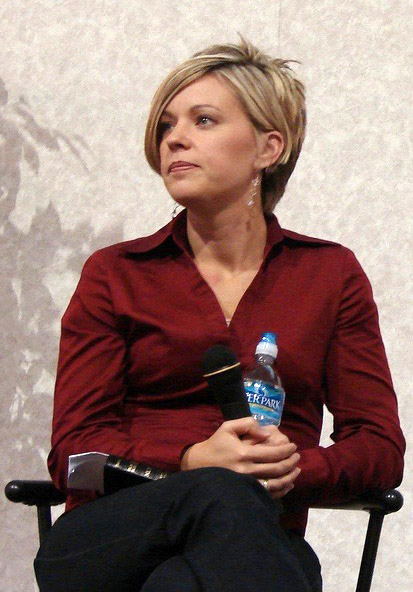
- Gosselin in 2008
- Born: Katie Irene Kreider; March 28, 1975 (age 51); Hershey, Pennsylvania, U.S.
- Education: Reading Hospital and Medical Center
- Occupations: Television Personality; Author; Registered Nurse
- Known for: Jon & Kate Plus 8 Kate Plus 8 Kate Plus Date
- Spouse: Jon Gosselin (m. 1999; div. 2009)
- Children: 8

Katie Irene "Kate" Gosselin (née Kreider; born March 28, 1975) is a former television personality. She appeared on the American reality TV show Jon & Kate Plus 8, in which she and Jon Gosselin were profiled as they raised their atypical family of sextuplets and twins.

== Early life and education ==
Katie Irene Kreider was born at Penn State Hershey Medical Center in 1975 to Charlene (née Kolak) and Kenton Kreider, a pastor. She is of German, Scottish, and English descent. The third of five children, she has three sisters, Kendra, Christen and Clairissa, and one brother, Kevin. Kreider completed nursing school at The Reading Hospital and Medical Center.

== Career ==
Kreider began her career as a labor and delivery nurse in Wyomissing, Pennsylvania. She met Jon Gosselin at a company picnic on October 5, 1997. They were married on June 12, 1999. Gosselin became pregnant through fertility treatment because polyendocrine metabolic ovarian syndrome (PMOS) left her unable to conceive otherwise. On October 8, 2000, she gave birth to twin girls, Cara Nicole and Madelyn "Mady" Kate, who were premature at 35 weeks gestation. After further treatments, Gosselin became pregnant again and, on May 10, 2004, in Hershey, Pennsylvania, at the Penn State Hershey Medical Center, she gave birth to sextuplets: sons Aaden Jonathan, Collin Thomas, and Joel Kevin; and daughters Alexis Faith, Hannah Joy, and Leah Hope. Born at just shy of 30 weeks gestation, the sextuplets were 10 weeks premature, which is common in the multiple births resulting from fertility treatments. The early birth required the six infants to be placed on ventilators.

=== Reality television ===
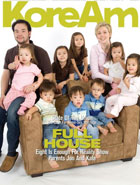
Gosselin and family on the cover of KoreAm in May 2007

Following the birth of the sextuplets, the Gosselins were featured in the NBC reality TV show Home Delivery when their home in Wyomissing, Pennsylvania was renovated to accommodate the large family.

The family was then featured in a special on Discovery Health in September 2005 entitled Surviving Sextuplets and Twins. A year later they were featured in another special entitled Sextuplets and Twins: One Year Later. With high ratings from the specials, Discovery Health signed the couple to a reality series which began airing in April 2007, called Jon & Kate Plus 8, documenting their lives. To produce the show, the family was filmed three or four days per week and the show's first two seasons aired on Discovery Health Channel before moving to The Learning Channel (TLC). The family received payment for appearing on the show.

On September 29, 2009, TLC announced the change in title of Jon & Kate Plus 8 to Kate Plus 8, continuing to follow Gosselin as a divorced mother, with Jon appearing infrequently on the show going forwards. The show was canceled during season five following Jon's decision to withdraw from the series, with the last episode—the finale of that season—airing on November 23 of that year. Season 2 of Kate Plus 8 premiered on November 28, 2010, and reruns of the show still air on TLC.

Gosselin filmed a talk show pilot with Paula Deen in September 2009. By late December 2009, it was announced that Gosselin was no longer being considered for the role, having been deemed too controversial by executives, and the show had not been picked up by a network by the end of the year. Gosselin was a contestant in the tenth season of Dancing with the Stars, and was partnered with professional dancer Tony Dovolani. She was eliminated from the competition in its fifth week in April 2010. Shortly after being eliminated, it was rumored that Gosselin was scheduled to appear in the upcoming season of the popular TV show The Bachelorette; this was denied by both TLC and the show's creator, Mike Fleiss.

On June 24, 2010, it was announced that Gosselin would be returning as a co-host on The View, having previously co-hosted it twice.

In August 2011, it was announced that Kate Plus 8 had not been renewed for a new season. The final episode of the show aired on September 12, 2011.

Gosselin and her children appeared in an episode of Celebrity Wife Swap in February 2013. Gosselin switched places with Kendra Wilkinson. Gosselin competed on the seventh season of The Celebrity Apprentice, being fired on the 9th task. On March 19, 2014, it was announced that Gosselin and her eight children would return for a reunion special of Kate Plus 8, scheduled to air in June of the same year. In August of the same year, it was announced that Kate Plus 8 would return for a new season on January 13, 2015, again on TLC. Season 5 premiered on November 22, 2016. Whilst season 6 was filming, Gosselin went through a custody battle with her ex-husband over two of their children, Collin and Hannah; following Jon's decision to withdraw from filming, the majority of season 6 was canceled, airing in 2017 with just three episodes.

Gosselin's new show, Kate Plus Date, premiered on TLC in June 2019.

In 2023, Gosselin appeared on the reality TV series Special Forces: World's Toughest Test. She was eliminated in the first episode due to a physical injury.

=== Writing ===
Gosselin has written three non-fiction books. Her first book, written with Jon Gosselin and Beth Carson, was published in November 2008, titled: Multiple Blessings. It debuted at number five on The New York Times Best Sellers list and sold over 500,000 copies by the end of 2009. Her second book, Eight Little Faces, was released in April 2009 and also debuted at number five on The New York Times Best Sellers list. Her third book, titled I Just Want You to Know, was released on April 13, 2010, selling approximately 10,000 copies in its first week and debuting at number 11 on The New York Times Best Sellers list.

=== Nursing ===
Kate Gosselin worked as a nurse when Jon and Kate Plus 8 first aired in 2007, practicing as a labor and delivery nurse at the Reading Hospital and Medical Center in Pennsylvania. In 2021, she obtained her multi-state, registered nurse license in North Carolina.

== Divorce ==
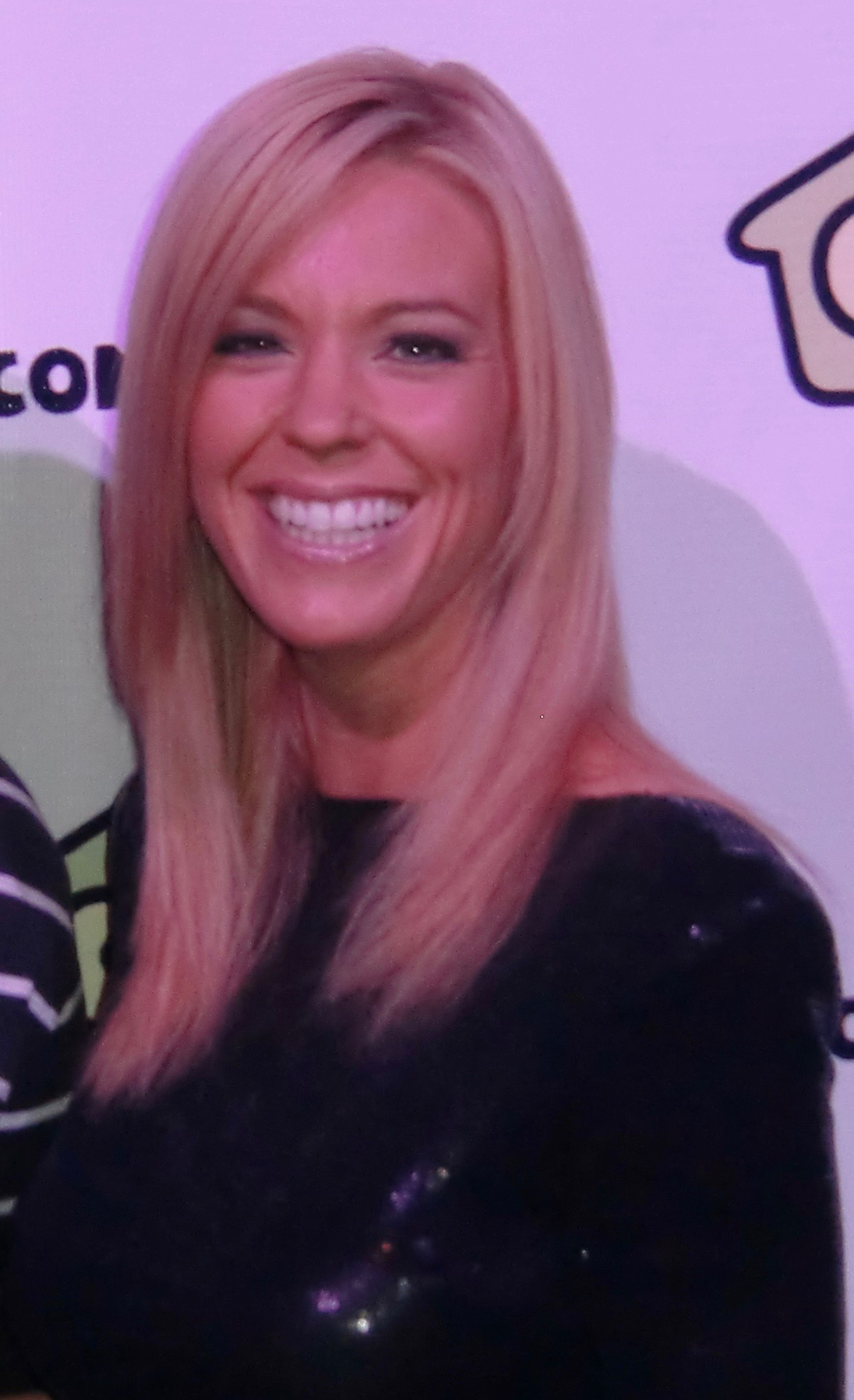
Gosselin in 2012

Jon and Kate announced on June 22, 2009, in an episode that they were separating. However, the two had met with Pennsylvania attorneys on the day that the episode aired to finalize plans for divorce rather than separation. They stated that their eight children will remain in their Pennsylvania home, and the two of them will move back and forth to accommodate the custody agreement. In separate interviews, they stated that the show would continue. However, TLC announced on June 23, 2009, that the show would be suspended with immediate effect. According to TLC, Jon and Kate had moved the focus away from the family and the change in the dynamic, as well as the production difficulties that had occurred because the couple was no longer living together, made it unclear whether the show was still viable.

On August 13, 2009, the police were called to the Gosselin family home in Wernersville, Pennsylvania, after the couple were engaged in a verbal fight. Kate arrived at the home during Jon's scheduled time with their children because she did not approve of the babysitter he was using. No arrests were made and no charges were filed against either party.

On December 16, 2009, it was announced that the couple's divorce was finalized. Kate Gosselin was granted the ownership of the family home and primary custody of the children.

Since the divorce, Gosselin has had a contentious relationship with her ex-husband, which has repeatedly made headlines. Kate announced in August 2016 that she enrolled Collin in a program to help him with his "special needs". On August 22, 2017, the police were called to an orthodontist's office in Wyomissing, Pennsylvania, after Jon and Kate got into a custody dispute over one of their sextuplet daughters. It was reported that either Jon or Kate took their then 13-year-old daughter to the orthodontist and the argument erupted over who would be taking her home. No one was arrested, and in the end, the daughter went home with Jon while Kate was referred to Berks County District Attorney's office for a clearer interpretation of the child custody agreement. It was later reported that the sextuplet daughter involved in the dispute may have been Hannah.

In August 2018, Jon revealed in an Instagram live video that Hannah "permanently" lives with him, as there has been an ongoing custody battle with Kate over their daughter. It was reported that in April 2018, a judge ruled in favor of Jon having custody of Hannah, which prompted Kate to appeal this decision on May 4, 2018. The judge denied the appeal on June 14, 2018, as Kate "did not present legal argument to justify this Court's jurisdiction," according to court documents.

On October 24, 2018, Jon and his attorney filed papers for physical and legal custody of Collin. They claimed that it would be in Collin's best interest to live with his father upon his release from the inpatient center Kate enrolled him in. On December 4, 2018, Jon won sole physical and legal custody of Collin, as Kate and her attorney failed to appear. It was reported on December 26, 2018, that Collin was released from the inpatient center and returned home with Jon for good. As of 2018, Kate and her ex-husband are no longer in communication, except through their attorneys. In August 2019, In Touch Weekly reported that Kate was not attempting to win custody of either Hannah or Collin from her ex-husband. According to Jon, neither Hannah nor Collin have contact with their mother.

== Controversies ==
During production on ''Jon + Kate Plus 8''', various criticisms were raised regarding Kate's intentions of continuing with the show, as well as whether or not the children were being exploited or were under emotional distress. According to lawyer Gloria Allred, "Every state does regulate to protect the health, the safety and welfare of little child performers [...] And these little ones are only eight years old and five years old, they can't protect themselves, so the state has to be sure that they are safe in their workplace." In the case of the show, the children's workplace is their home. At that time, there were no clear laws in Pennsylvania regarding a child's appearance on a reality show. However, Pennsylvania law permits children who are at least seven years old to work in the entertainment industry, as long as certain guidelines are followed and a permit is obtained. For example, children may not work after 11:30 p.m. under most circumstances, or perform in any location that serves alcoholic beverages. Gosselin claimed that the children were happy and healthy and were never in any danger from doing the show. TLC released a statement saying that the network "fully complies with all applicable laws and regulations" to produce the show. The statement also said that "for an extended period of time, we have been engaged in cooperative discussions and supplied all requested information to the Pennsylvania Department of Labor and Industry".

An investigation by the Pennsylvania Bureau of Labor Law Compliance found that "The activity being filmed was spontaneous. However, children introduced episodes of the television show and transitions. DVDs and other merchandise were sold involving the children's appearance. Lighting was placed in the home for the show and there was product placement in some episodes." Because of these reasons, the children were considered to be working on the show, and the show was required to obtain work permits for the children, which it did not do. An agreement was reached that no charges would be filed immediately as long as no further violations would occur.

In 2022, one of Gosselin's children, Collin Thomas, came forward with allegations of abuse directed at his mother. He had been placed in an inpatient treatment centre in 2016 for a twenty month period before being transferred to another facility before being released into his father's custody in 2018. It was alleged that Gosselin placed her son there to keep quiet and to ensure production on the reality series would continue. Gosselin denied the allegations of abuse, claiming that her son was admitted to the facility on the advice of a physician in the aftermath of an incident involving a weapon. In 2026, Collin released a memoir titled "In The Shadow of Eight" detailing his life during production on the series, being sent away, and life after leaving the institution.

== Personal life ==
In March 2021, Gosselin relocated to Troutman, North Carolina, with four of her children; Alexis, Aaden, Leah, and Joel. As of 2023, the twins both reside in New York City, with Cara graduating from Fordham University and Mady graduating from Syracuse University. Both resided with their mother when home from their respective colleges. Meanwhile, Hannah and Collin remained with their father back in Pennsylvania. Collin enlisted in the US Marine Corps in 2023. After the move, Kate obtained her multi-state, registered nurse license in North Carolina on June 30, 2021.

== Bibliography ==
- Multiple Blessings (November 1, 2008)
- Eight Little Faces (April 1, 2009)
- I Just Want You to Know (April 13, 2010)
- Love Is in the Mix (September 4, 2013)
- Gosselin, Collin (October 8, 2026). In the Shadow of Eight: Surviving the Reality of My Childhood,. Grand Central Publishing. ISBN 978-1538784723.

== Filmography ==
Year	Title	Role	Notes
2005	Surviving Sextuplets and Twins	Herself	One-hour special
2006	Sextuplets and Twins: One Year Later	Herself	One-hour special
2007–2017	Jon & Kate Plus 8 / Kate Plus 8	Herself	Reality series
2008	Say Yes to the Dress	Herself	One episode
2010	Dancing with the Stars	Herself	Competitive reality series
2010	Sarah Palin's Alaska	Herself	One episode
2013	Celebrity Wife Swap	Herself	One episode
2014	Kate Plus Eight: Sextuplets Turn 10	Herself	Two one-hour specials
2014	The Apprentice (American TV series) season 14	Herself	Competitive reality series
2019	Kate Plus Date	Herself	Reality dating series
2023	Special Forces: World's Toughest Test	Herself	Competitive reality series
