= Kevin O'Connor (TV personality) =

American television personality

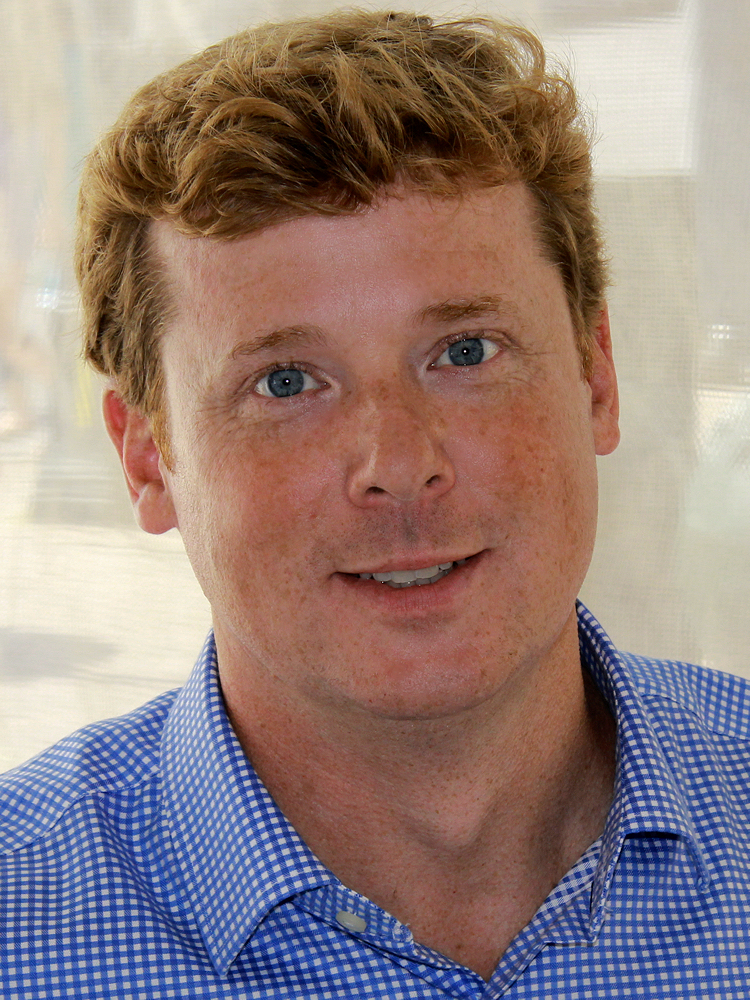
- O'Connor in 2011
- Born: 1968 or 1969 (age 57–58); Maplewood, New Jersey, U.S.
- Education: College of the Holy Cross (BA); Boston University (MBA)
- Occupation: Television personality
- Known for: This Old House; Ask This Old House
- Spouse: Kathleen
- Children: 4
- Website: officialkevinoconnor.com

Kevin O'Connor (born 1968 or 1969) is an American television personality. He has been the host of the PBS home renovation series This Old House since replacing Steve Thomas in 2003.

== Early life and education ==
O'Connor was born and raised in Maplewood, New Jersey. He and his four brothers and two sisters grew up on job sites led by his father, a civil engineer.

After graduating from Saint Benedict's Preparatory School in Newark, New Jersey, in 1986, O'Connor attended the College of the Holy Cross in Worcester, Massachusetts. He graduated from Holy Cross with a Bachelor of Arts degree in history in 1990, then earned a Master of Business Administration (MBA) Boston University in 1999.

== Career ==
O'Connor worked for Fleet Bank as a vice president in the Sports Finance Group, then worked for Bank of America as a Senior Vice President in the Commercial Real Estate Group after Fleet Bank was bought by Bank of America.

The producers of This Old House approached him to become their new host following the departure of Steve Thomas. O'Connor and his wife, Kathleen, appeared on an episode of Ask This Old House (Season 1, Episode 22), in which painting contractor Jim Clark helped them with wallpaper removal in their house in Beverly, Massachusetts. O'Connor made his hosting debut on This Old House in the Season 25 premiere.

O'Connor, also the host of Ask This Old House and Inside This Old House, holds a position on the editorial board of the This Old House magazine, published by This Old House Ventures, Inc.

In September 2011, O'Connor debuted as the author of his first book The Best Homes from This Old House.

== Personal life ==
O'Connor married his wife, Kathleen, in 1991. They have raised four children in Ridgewood and Quogue.
