= Sarah Palin's Alaska =

- Genre: Reality
- Starring: Sarah Palin; Todd Palin; Willow Palin; Piper Palin other Palin and Heath family members
- Opening theme: "Follow Me There" by Third Day
- Country of origin: United States
- Original language: English
- No. of seasons: 1
- No. of episodes: 9

Production
- Executive producers: Mark Burnett; Sarah Palin
- Running time: 42 minutes

Original release
- Network: TLC
- Release: November 14, 2010 – January 9, 2011

Sarah Palin's Alaska is an American reality television show hosted by former Alaska Governor Sarah Palin. According to Palin, the show's aim is to bring "the wonder and majesty of Alaska to all Americans." The series, which began airing on TLC in November 2010, broadcast 8 episodes and 1 clip show. The show was part travelogue and part documentary series, according to a story in The Vancouver Sun. The show was cancelled after one season.

The show was produced by Mark Burnett Productions for Discovery Communications.

== Reviews and reception ==
In reviewing the first episode, The New York Times said Sarah Palin's Alaska is a reality show living up to its title, and "a nature series for political voyeurs" that allows "viewers to get to observe Ms. Palin observing nature". The paper commended Palin for her political courage in appearing in the series and for not being afraid to be herself.

Five million viewers tuned in for the premiere episode, a record for TLC. Before the airing of the last episode, Entertainment Weekly reported that the show had maintained an average viewership of 3.2 million per week, but that it would not be renewed for a second season.

== Episodes ==
| No. | Title | Original release date | U.S. viewers (millions) |
|---|---|---|---|
| 1 | "Mama Grizzly" | November 14, 2010 | 4.95 |
Sarah escapes her busy schedule to spend quality time with her youngest daughter, Piper. Together with husband, Todd, they go salmon fishing in bear country. Later, Sarah and Todd climb one of Denali's most challenging peaks.
| 2 | "Just for the Halibut" | November 21, 2010 | 3.03 |
Sarah and family take a road trip to Homer, Alaska. There they meet a halibut fishing family, who invite Sarah and oldest daughter, Bristol, deep sea fishing, allowing the two to bond.
| 3 | "Salmon Run" | November 28, 2010 | 3.48 |
Sarah and Todd embark on their Fourth of July tradition of fishing salmon in Bristol Bay, Willow's birthday, the world's biggest wild salmon run. Todd, a lifelong fisherman, is renowned for catching the most fish. Son, Track, works to earn the title of captain on his father's boat.
| 4 | "She's a Great Shot" | December 5, 2010 | 2.78 |
Sarah's freezer is almost empty and winter is approaching. She embarks on a caribou hunting trip with her father, Chuck and friend Steve Becker. They travel 500 miles from the nearest city, above the Arctic Circle, in search of a caribou for food.
| 5 | "Alaskan Hospitality" | December 12, 2010 | 3.06 |
In a crossover with the Kate Plus 8 episode "Alaska, Here We Come!", Sarah welcomes Kate Gosselin and her children to Alaska. To prepare for a camping trip with the kids, Sarah takes Kate to a bear safety class for rifle practice. Then Kate and the kids experience the wilderness braving the challenges of camping in Alaska.
| 6 | "Rafting" | December 19, 2010 | 2.56 |
Sarah Palin is packing up her RV and taking her family on an overnight trip that includes white water rafting and ATVing. Later, Sarah and Piper spend some mother/daughter time. They meet Iditarod champions Martin Buser and Mitch Seavey and go dog sledding on a nearby glacier.
| 7 | "Logging" | December 26, 2010 | N/A |
Sarah along with her husband, Todd, and daughter, Willow, go to a remote logging camp on Alaska's Afognak Island to get a taste of the Alaskan logging industry. Sarah cuts down Sitka Spruce trees and operates dangerous logging equipment on the island.
| 8 | "Gold Mining and Oil" | January 2, 2011 | 2.45 |
Sarah, her brother, Chuck, and their kids go to Nome hunting for gold. The plan: to find enough to make Sarah's mom an anniversary gift. Chuck leads the way panning for gold then to Valdez; kayaking a glacier that was once part of the 1890s Gold Route.
| 9 | "Follow Me There" | January 9, 2011 | 2.36 |
The one-hour series finale is a clip episode showing of the series' most notable moments, and features never before seen moments.
