= Jon Gosselin =

American television personality (born 1977)

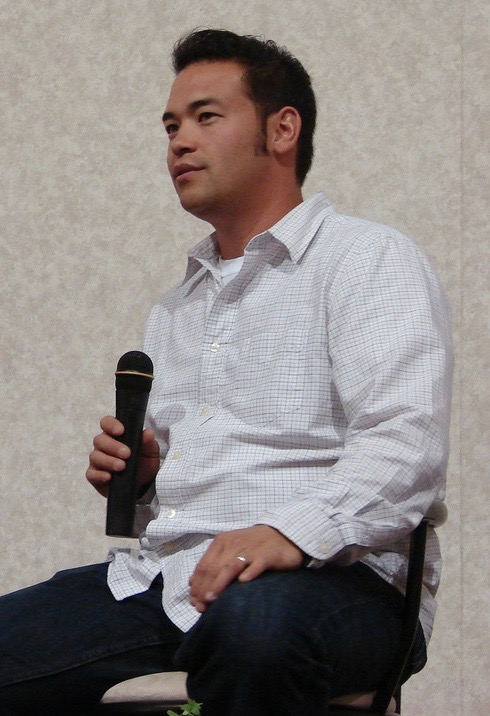
- Gosselin in 2008
- Born: Jonathan Keith Gosselin; April 1, 1977 (age 49); Wyomissing, Pennsylvania, U.S.
- Occupations: IT analyst; television personality; DJ
- Known for: Jon & Kate Plus 8
- Spouses: Kate Kreider (m. 1999; div. 2009) Stephanie Lebo (m. 2025)
- Children: 8

Jonathan Keith "Jon" Gosselin (born April 1, 1977) is an American former television personality, previously known for his appearances with former wife Kate Gosselin and their eight children on the American reality TV show Jon & Kate Plus 8.

== Early life ==
Jonathan Keith Gosselin was born and raised in Wyomissing, Pennsylvania, as the middle child in a family of three children. He has two brothers, Thomas and Mark. Gosselin's mother, Pamela Castello (née Lyum), was born and raised in Hawaii as a second-generation Korean American. Gosselin's father died on January 13, 2005. Gosselin graduated from Wyomissing High School in 1995.

Gosselin met Kate Kreider at a company picnic on October 5, 1997. They married on June 12, 1999. On October 8, 2000, their twin daughters, Cara Nicole and Madelyn "Mady" Kate, were born. Initially, Gosselin was against having a third child, but he and Kate eventually decided they would try again. On May 10, 2004, Kate gave birth to sextuplets: sons Aaden Jonathan, Collin Thomas, and Joel Kevin, and daughters Alexis Faith, Hannah Joy, and Leah Hope. The sextuplets were born 10 weeks premature, which is common in cases of multiple births.

== Television fame ==
They received local media coverage until the sextuplets were 17 months old, when Discovery Health offered the couple a reality series chronicling the lives of their family.

The Discovery Health special, called Surviving Sextuplets and Twins, first aired in September 2005. One year later, the family was featured in another special titled Sextuplets and Twins: One Year Later. Both specials received high Nielsen ratings, and Discovery Health signed the couple to a series that aired beginning in April 2007. During this time, the family was filmed for three to four days per week, and received payment for appearing on the show.

They soon switched over to TLC.

Gosselin co-wrote Multiple Blessings: Surviving to Thriving with Twins and Sextuplets with then-wife Kate Gosselin and Beth Carson, a book that made The New York Times Best Seller list.

== Divorce ==
It was announced on the June 22, 2009 episode of the show that the couple were separating, and that divorce proceedings had begun. Gosselin then began looking for a new apartment in New York City, reportedly visiting Donald Trump-owned Trump Place in Manhattan's Upper West Side.

Gosselin stated that it is Kate who wanted the divorce, while Kate stated that "Jon's activities" left her with "no choice but to file legal procedures in order to protect" herself and the children. Gosselin released a statement in response, noting that his wife was the first to make a legal move, and speaking of his continuing love for his children. Speculation rose that Gosselin's relationship with Hailey Glassman, the daughter of Kate's plastic surgeon, was the cause for the divorce, but Glassman denied the speculation, saying that her relationship with Gosselin began only after Gosselin and Kate had been separated for months.

On August 13, 2009, the police were called to the Gosselin family home in Wernersville, Pennsylvania, after Gosselin and Kate were engaged in a heated argument. She arrived at the home during his time with their eight children because she did not approve of the babysitter he was using. No arrests were made and no charges were filed against either party.

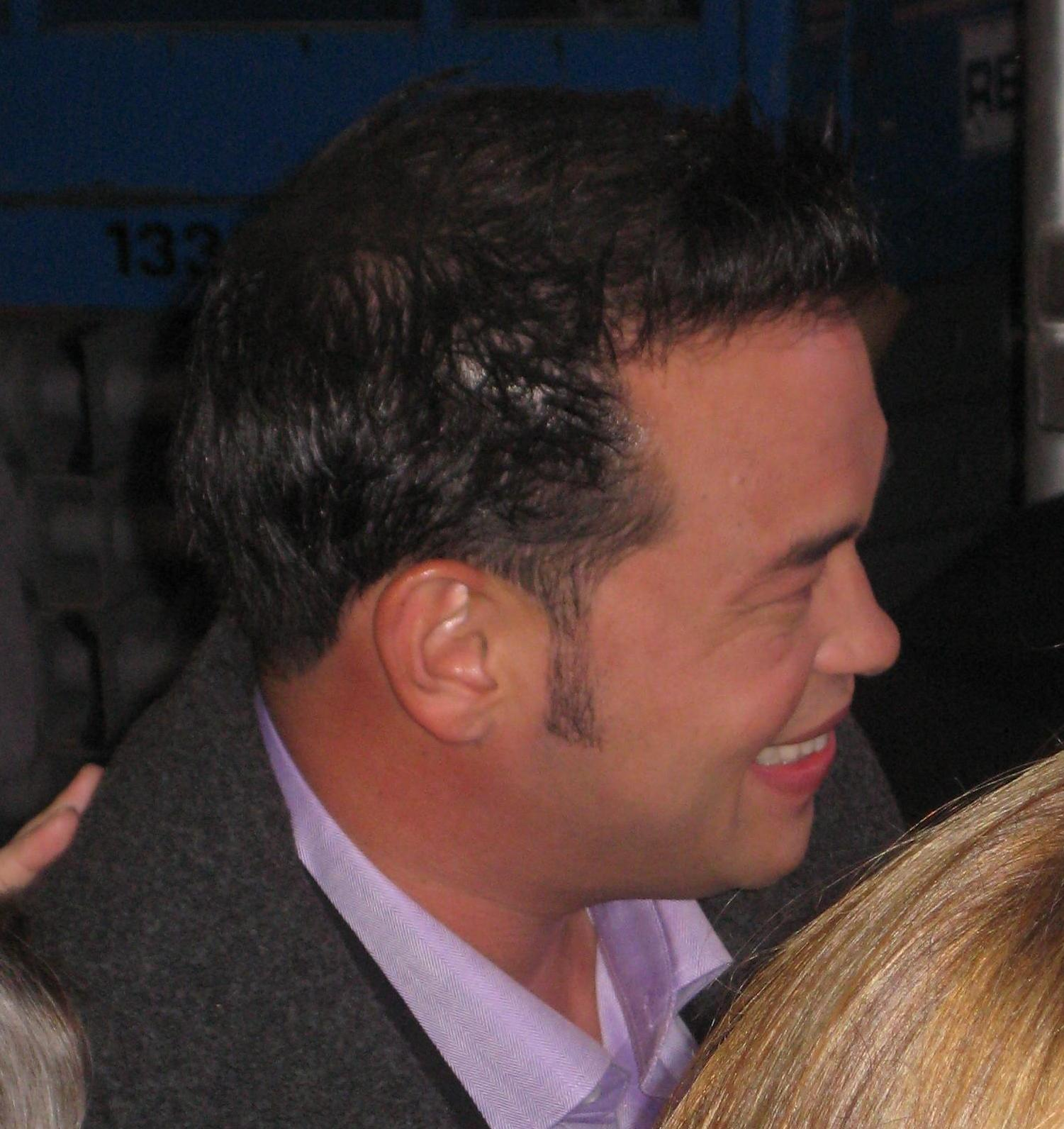
Gosselin in 2009

On September 29, 2009, TLC announced that, as of November 3, 2009, Jon & Kate Plus 8 would change its name to Kate Plus 8. Gosselin would continue to appear on the show, but less frequently. However, on October 1, 2009, People.com reported that Gosselin filed a legal action against TLC to prevent the show from resuming and would consider the entry of production crews into the family home as criminal trespassing. The final episode of Jon & Kate Plus 8 aired on November 23, 2009, announced by TLC three days earlier.

In late September 2009, Gosselin filed paperwork seeking to stall the divorce for 90 days, saying, "I regret my conduct since Kate and I separated ... I used poor judgment in publicly socializing with other women so soon." Among the terms of the divorce was a child support order for $22,000 a month.

On October 15, 2009, it was announced that TLC had filed suit against Gosselin for allegedly violating their contract with paid and unpaid television appearances he had recently made on several media outlets. The network claimed it lost more than $30,000 as a result of his alleged breach of their contract. His attorney responded that the contract was null and void once TLC renamed the show Kate Plus 8, and that in any event the contract is unenforceable because it was signed while Gosselin had no legal representation.

On December 18, 2009, it was announced that the couple's divorce had been finalized. Kate was granted primary custody of the children and the ownership of the family home. Earlier in the month, Gosselin's girlfriend, Hailey Glassman, announced that she broke up with Gosselin because she discovered during a deposition in his lawsuit against TLC that he had been unfaithful to her by having a relationship with Kate Major, a reporter for The Star tabloid.

Since the divorce, Gosselin has had a difficult relationship with his ex-wife, which has repeatedly made headlines. He is also estranged from most of his children, as Cara, Mady, Alexis, Aaden, Leah, and Joel have cut off all contact with him. Alexis, Aaden, Leah, and Joel moved with Kate to North Carolina when she relocated to the state in March 2021. The twins currently live in New York City, with Cara graduating from Fordham University and Mady graduating from Syracuse University in 2023. The only children Gosselin sees are Hannah and Collin, as both children now live with him. On August 22, 2017, the police were called to an orthodontist's office in Wyomissing, Pennsylvania, after Gosselin and Kate got into a custody dispute over one of their sextuplet daughters. It was reported that either Gosselin or Kate took their then 13-year-old daughter to the orthodontist and the argument erupted over who would be taking her home. No one was arrested, and in the end, Gosselin took the daughter home while Kate was referred to Berks County District Attorney's office for a more clear interpretation of the child custody agreement. It was later reported that the sextuplet daughter involved in the dispute may have been Hannah.

In August 2018, Gosselin revealed in an Instagram live video that Hannah was "permanently" living with him; there has been an ongoing custody battle with Kate over their daughter. It was reported that in April 2018, a judge awarded custody of Hannah to Gosselin. Kate would appeal this decision on May 4, 2018. The judge denied the appeal on June 14, 2018, as Kate "did not present legal argument to justify this Court's jurisdiction," according to court documents.

On October 24, 2018, Gosselin and his attorney filed papers for physical and legal custody of Collin. They claimed that it would be in Collin's best interest to live with his father upon his release from an inpatient center, where Kate enrolled him in 2016. On December 4, 2018, Gosselin won sole physical and legal custody of Collin, as Kate and her attorney failed to appear. It was reported on December 26, 2018, that Collin was released from the inpatient center and returned home with Gosselin for good. Since 2018, Gosselin and his ex-wife only comment with each other through their legal representation.

== Break-in ==
On December 26, 2009, upon returning to his New York apartment after visiting his children for Christmas, Gosselin discovered that his apartment had been broken into. The damage was estimated at $100,000. A note with his ex-girlfriend's name was found attached to Gosselin's dresser with a knife, but law enforcement officials stated that did not prove she was associated with the acts.

== Post-Jon & Kate ==
=== Relationships ===
In January 2012, Gosselin began dating Liz Jannetta, a divorced mother of three who works with computers. The relationship lasted for two years, as they broke up in September 2014 after they made an appearance on the VH1 reality show Couples Therapy.

In July 2015, it was reported that Gosselin had been in a relationship with a registered nurse named Colleen Conrad. They dated from October 2014 to February 2021.

In December 2024, Gosselin and his fiancé Stephanie Lebo revealed in an Entertainment Tonight interview that they had recently gotten engaged after dating for three years. On November 23, 2025, Gosselin married Lebo in an intimate Pennsylvania wedding where his kids Collin and Hannah were in attendance.

=== Career ===
In February 2011, Gosselin was working for Green Pointe Energy in Pennsylvania, installing solar panels. In September 2013, he was a waiter at two restaurants in Pennsylvania, near his home in Robeson Township. He was later reported to become a maitre d' at one of the restaurants.

As of December 2016, Gosselin worked at T.G.I. Friday's in Lancaster, Pennsylvania as a prep cook eight hours a week and gives his paycheck to charity.

As of May 2020, Gosselin works as an IT director at a private, non-profit healthcare facility.

=== Music ===
Gosselin has worked as a DJ. It was previously reported that he DJs 12 to 15 gigs a month in his hometown of Wyomissing, Pennsylvania.

On an appearance on Dr. Oz November 2021, Gosselin stated he had been working on a hip hop album for approximately five years. In May 2022, Gosselin released a hip hop track titled "Voicemail" with The International DJ Casper. HuffPost called the slow-jam song "heavily auto-tuned". Today's Randee Dawn agreed with their critique, writing "That's a lot of Auto-Tune." Both Gosselin and The International DJ Casper promoted the song, with Gosselin stating the two are working on releasing more music.
