= Dan Seavey (musher) =

American musher (1937–2025)

Dan Seavey (August 19, 1937 – May 8, 2025) was an American dog musher and teacher who helped organize the Iditarod Trail Sled Dog Race. He was the father of Mitch Seavey and grandfather of Dallas Seavey, who are also dog mushers.

== Life and career ==
=== Early life ===
Seavey was born in Deerwood, Minnesota, on August 19, 1937. His father worked as a miner and, along with his mother, operated a family farm. Seavey attended St. Cloud State University, graduating in 1961 with a degree in education. In 1963, Seavey moved to Seward, Alaska, to work as a history teacher.

=== Involvement with sled dog racing ===
Seavey was involved in the sled dog racing community and, along with Joe Redington and others, helped organize the first iteration of the Iditarod Trail Sled Dog Race. Seavey said that the race was "an attempt to rebuild a tangible connection with" the Iditarod Trail, which played a major role in Alaskan history. He was mostly uninterested in the race's competitive aspects, saying in 2012 that "physical experience is most important in learning about something" and that his participation in the race helped him better understand Alaska's history.

In 1973, Seavey competed in the race's first iteration. In the lead-up to the inaugural race, Seavey trained around his school schedule and had to petition the school board for time off to compete. During the race, he took notes on his experience using a cassette recorder and carried 350 souvenir letters which he mailed from Nome. He finished the race in third place on March 23, 1973, twenty days after he started. He competed again in 1974, placing fifth out of twenty-six contestants. During the race he faced a near-death experience after the frozen water of a river began to buckle as he crossed, causing him and his dogs to begin sinking before making it to shore. He went on to race three additional times, with his final race taking place in 2012 at the age of 74.

=== Other ventures ===
In 1978, Seavey wrote the book The First Great Race, which discussed the first iteration of the Iditarod Trail Sled Dog Race. In 1984, Seavey retired from teaching, shifting his focus towards fishing and organizational management. He also opened a tour bus company that catered to tourists arriving in Seward on cruise ships. Seavey served on multiple boards relating to the Iditarod Trail.

== Personal life ==
Seavey was married to Shirley Anderson, who died in 2017. They had three children. Two of his sons (Mitch Seavey and Danny Seavey) and his grandson, Dallas Seavey, followed in his footsteps and became dog mushers. Seavey died on May 8, 2025 while tending to his sled dogs at his home in Seward, Alaska.
