= This Old House =

American home improvement television series

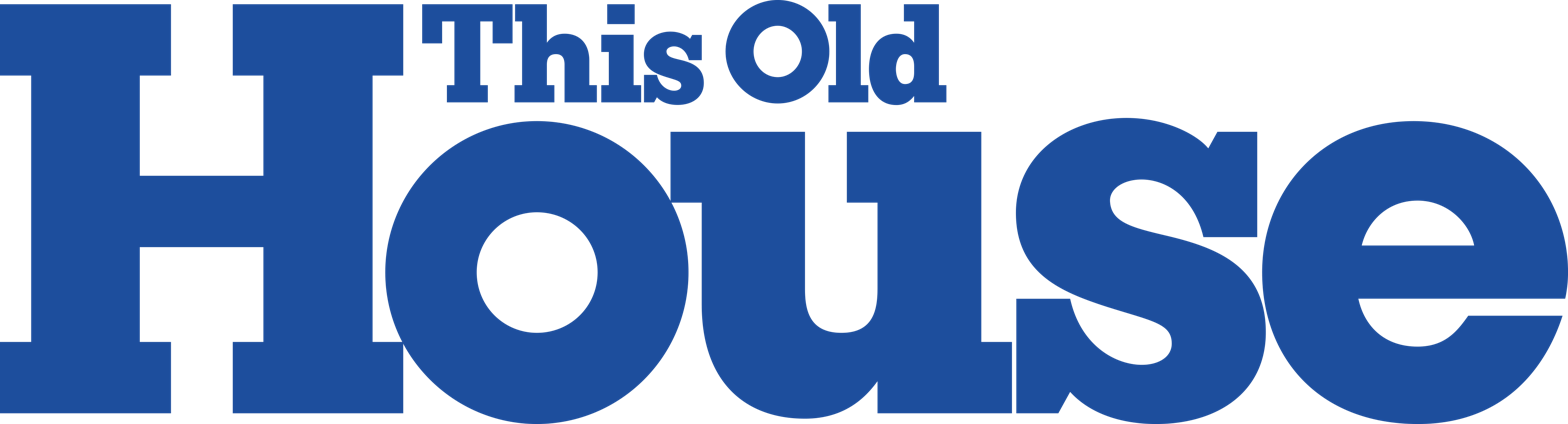
- Created by: Russell Morash (through WGBH-TV)
- Presented by: Bob Vila (1979–1989); Steve Thomas (1989–2003); Kevin O'Connor (2003–present)
- Starring: Norm Abram (master carpenter, 1979–2022); Tom Silva (general contractor, 1986–present); Richard Trethewey (master plumber and HVAC, 1981–present); Roger Cook (landscaping and garden expert, 1988–2020); Jenn Nawada (landscaping and garden expert, 2020–present); Heath Eastman (electrical expert); Mauro Henrique (painting expert); Mark McCullough (masonry expert); Ross Trethewey (technology expert)
- Country of origin: United States
- Original language: English
- No. of seasons: 47
- No. of episodes: 1,196 (list of episodes)

Production
- Running time: 30 minutes
- Production companies: This Old House Ventures (since 2001); WGBH Boston (1979–2019); WETA Washington, D.C. (2019–present)

Original release
- Network: PBS (1979–present); syndication (2001–present)
- Release: February 20, 1979 – present

Related
- Ask This Old House, Inside This Old House, The New Yankee Workshop

This Old House is an American home improvement media brand with television shows, a magazine, and a website. The brand is headquartered in Stamford, Connecticut. The television series airs on the Public Broadcasting Service (PBS) television network and follows remodeling projects of houses over a series of weekly episodes.

Boston PBS station WGBH-TV originally created the program and produced it from its inception in 1979 until 2001, when Time Inc. acquired the television assets and formed This Old House Ventures. WGBH also distributed episodes to PBS until 2019, when WETA-TV became the distributor starting with season 41. Warner Bros. Domestic Television distributes the series to commercial television stations in broadcast syndication. Time Inc. launched This Old House magazine in 1995, focusing on home how-to, know-how, and inspiration.

In 2016, Time Inc. sold This Old House Ventures to executive Eric Thorkilsen and private equity firm TZP Growth Partners (although it continued to have a special partnership deal with its former parent company). On March 19, 2021, Roku acquired This Old House Ventures.

On March 11, 2025, American Public Media and KPCC Los Angeles announced that they will air the radio version of This Old House on Public Radio Stations.

== Overview ==
This Old House and its sister series Ask This Old House are often broadcast together as The This Old House Hour, which was originally known as The New This Old House Hour. Both shows are owned by This Old House Ventures, Inc. and are underwritten by Renewal by Andersen and The Home Depot.

Two of the original underwriters were Weyerhauser and Owens-Corning. Weyerhauser, a lumber distributor, had donated more than $1,000,000 a year to the show by 1989. Other underwriters throughout the show's tenure have included Parks Corporation, Glidden, Montgomery Ward, Ace Hardware, Kohler, Schlage, Century 21 Real Estate, Toro, ERA Real Estate, Angie's List, Amica Mutual Insurance, GAF, Mitsubishi Electric, GMC, State Farm Insurance, HomeServe, Marvin Windows and Doors and Lumber Liquidators.

The third series to share the name is Inside This Old House, a retrospective featuring highlights from previous episodes. Vintage, classic, and memorable episodes are also shown under the program name This Old House Classics and were shown on TLC under the name The Renovation Guide, which aired from 1996 to 2001. Only the episodes with the show's first host Bob Vila aired under that name.

This Old House was one of the earliest home improvement shows on national television. As such, it was initially controversial among building contractors, and some cast members were afraid that they were giving away secrets of the building trades. As time passed the show grew into a cultural icon, and producer-director Russell Morash became known as the "Father of How-To".

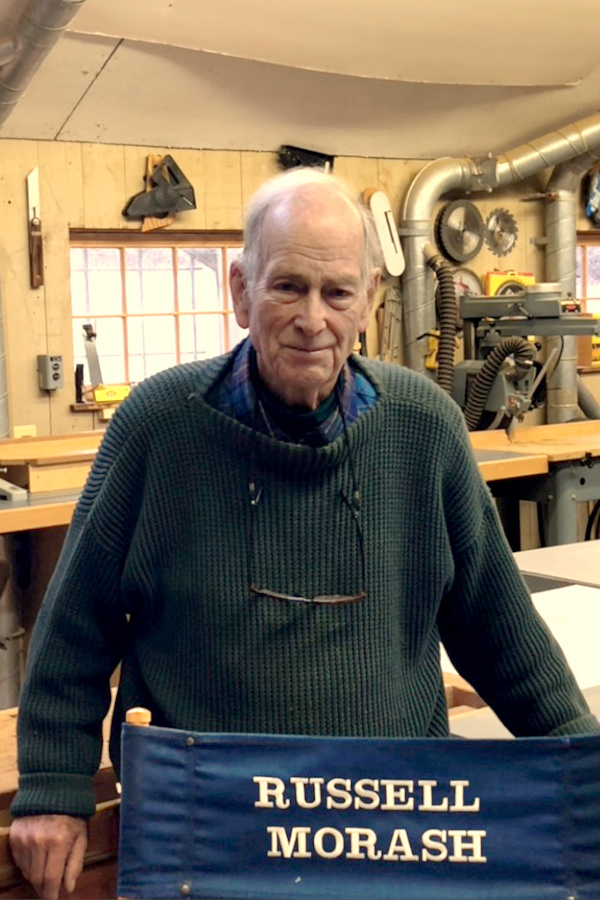
Russell Morash—creator, producer and director, 1979–2004

== History ==
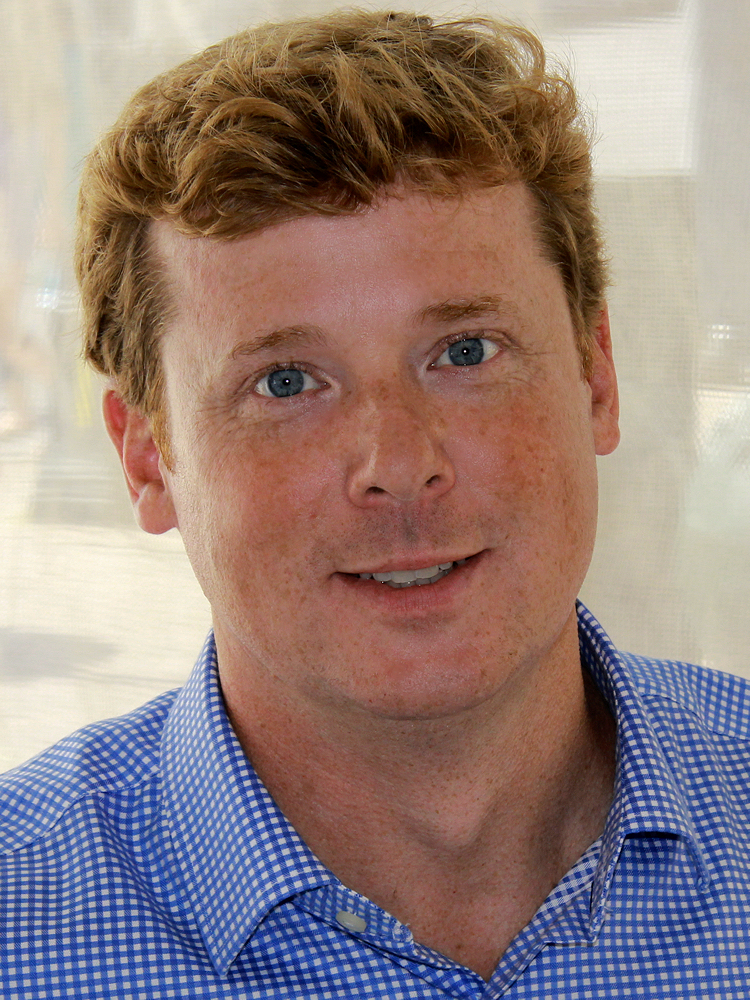
Kevin O'Connor, host since 2003

Begun in 1979 as a one time, thirteen part series airing on WGBH, This Old House has grown into one of the most popular programs on the network. It has produced spin-offs (notably The New Yankee Workshop hosted by Norm Abram), a magazine, and for-profit websites. The show has won seventeen Emmy Awards and received 82 nominations.

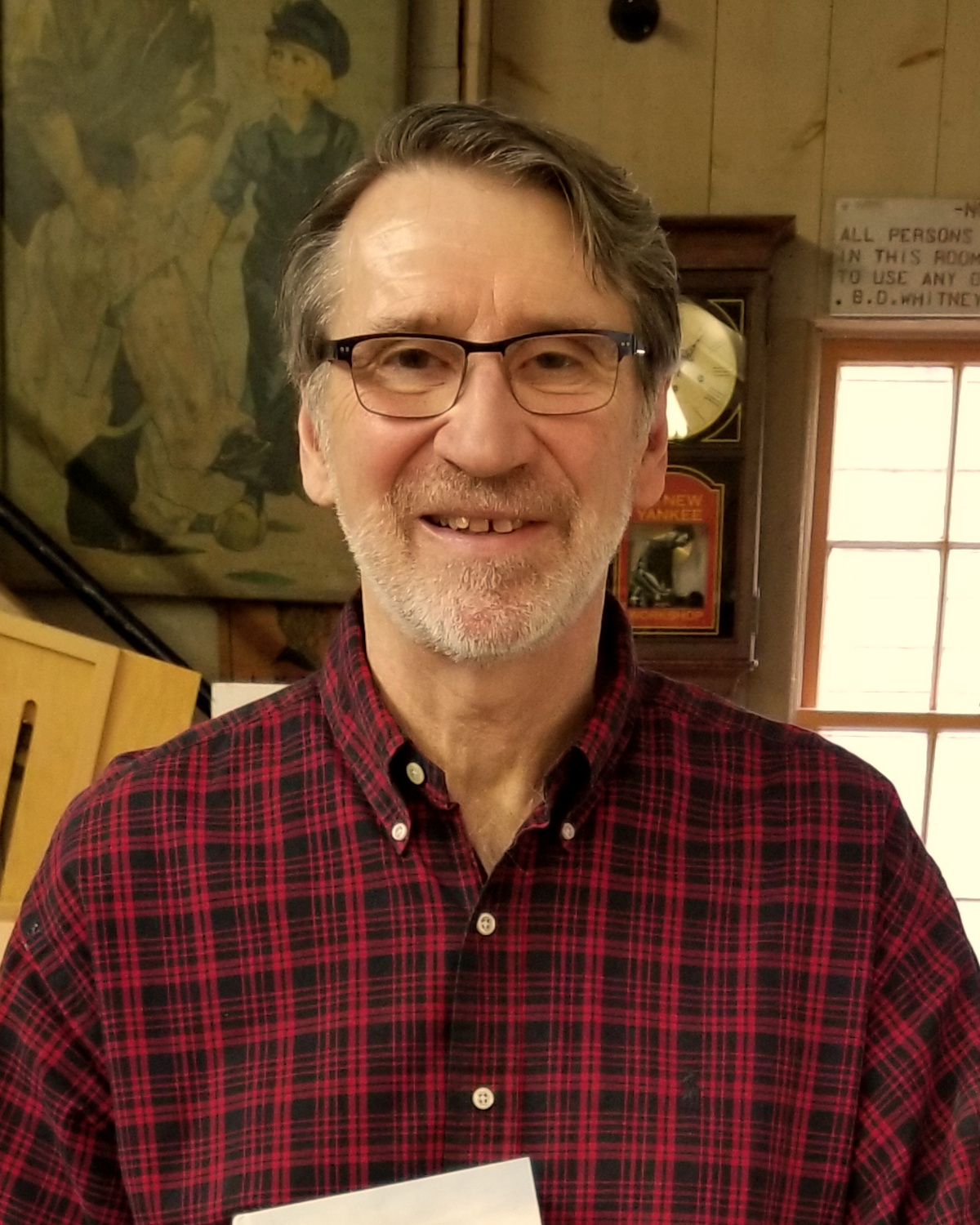
Norm Abram, Master Carpenter 1979–2022

Although WGBH acquired the first two project houses (6 Percival Street in Dorchester and the Bigelow House in Newton) for renovation, the series originally focused on renovating older houses, including those of modest size and value, with the homeowners doing some of the work as a form of sweat equity. The series covering the renovation of the Westwood house (Weatherbee Farm) became something of a cult classic because of an escalating dispute between the hosts, Vila and Abram, and the homeowners over the direction the project was taking. Vila remarked at the end of the Westwood series that the owners could have contributed more "sweat equity". As the show evolved, it began to focus on higher end, luxury homes with more of the work done by expert contractors and tradespeople.

Vila left This Old House in 1989. For much of his time as host, as he only earned between $200 and $800 per episode, Vila had taken on various commercial endorsements with the blessing of WGBH and show producer Russell Morash. Earlier in 1989, Vila had been approached by Supermarkets General Corporation, the owner of the Rickel chain of home improvement stores, to replace Bruce Morrow as the company's television spokesman. Vila's decision led to major underwriter and Rickel competitor Home Depot, as well as its lumber supplier Weyerhauser, to respond by pulling support. Vila declined to stop working with Rickel and news articles variously report that Morash fired him, or that he quit.

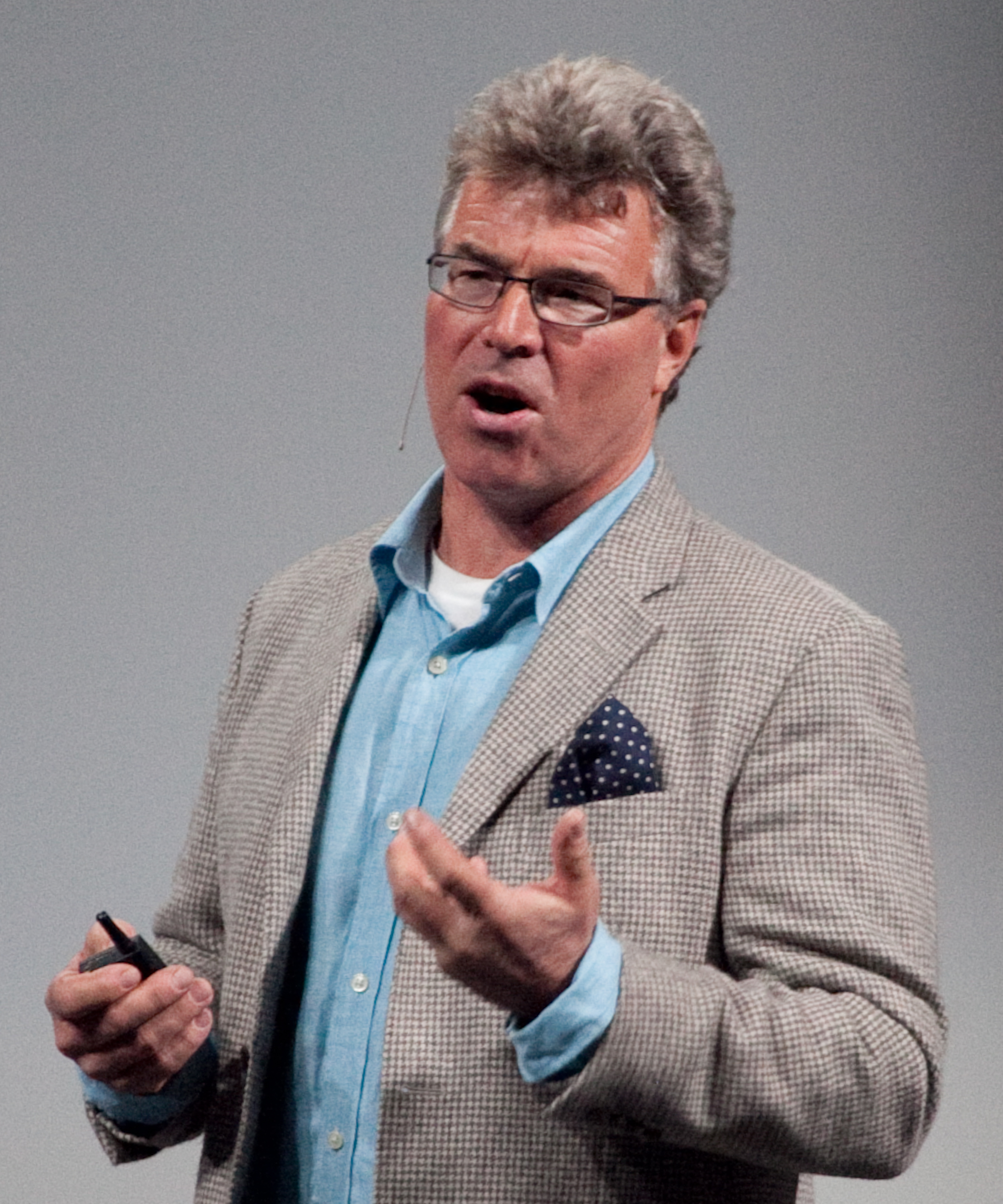
Steve Thomas, Host from 1989 to 2003

Steve Thomas took over hosting duties after Vila's departure, remaining with the program until 2003. Cast members noted that the show became more of an ensemble production after Vila left.

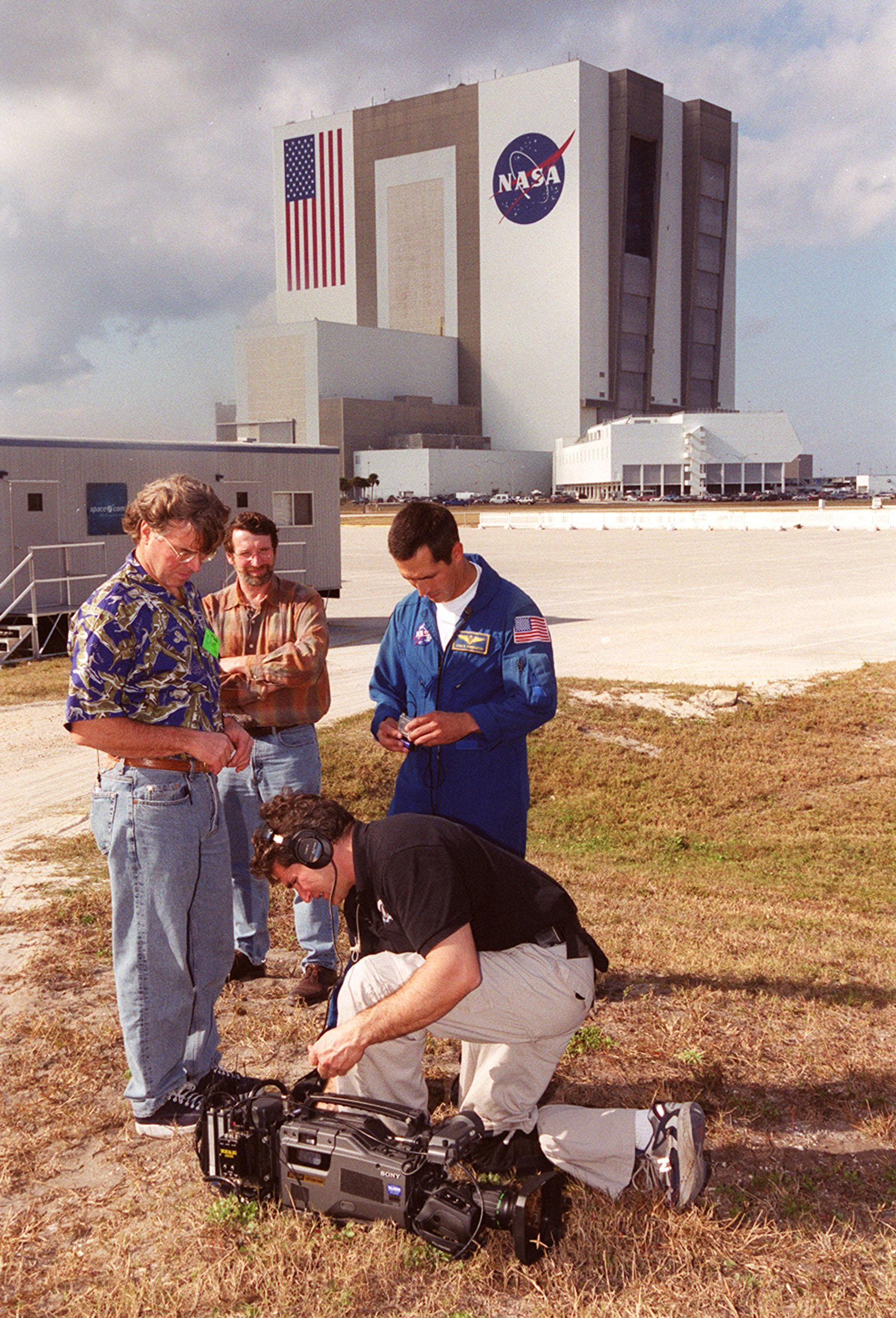
Across from the Vehicle Assembly Building and Launch Control Center at the Kennedy Space Center, Steve Thomas (left), host of This Old House, and Norm Abram (second from left), master carpenter on the series, watch as a videographer (in front) checks his camera. With them is astronaut John Herrington. The cast and crew of This Old House are filming at KSC for an episode of the show.

Since 2003, Kevin O'Connor has been the host of This Old House. Before O'Connor joined the cast, he was a homeowner who appeared on Ask This Old House, seeking help with wallpaper removal. During O'Connor's tenure as host, Abram's role increased to that of a near co-host. In at least a few season-opening episodes (in Cambridge, Carlisle, and Austin), Abram appeared alongside O'Connor to introduce the new project, and Abram also filled in for O'Connor when O'Connor's son was born during the Carlisle project.

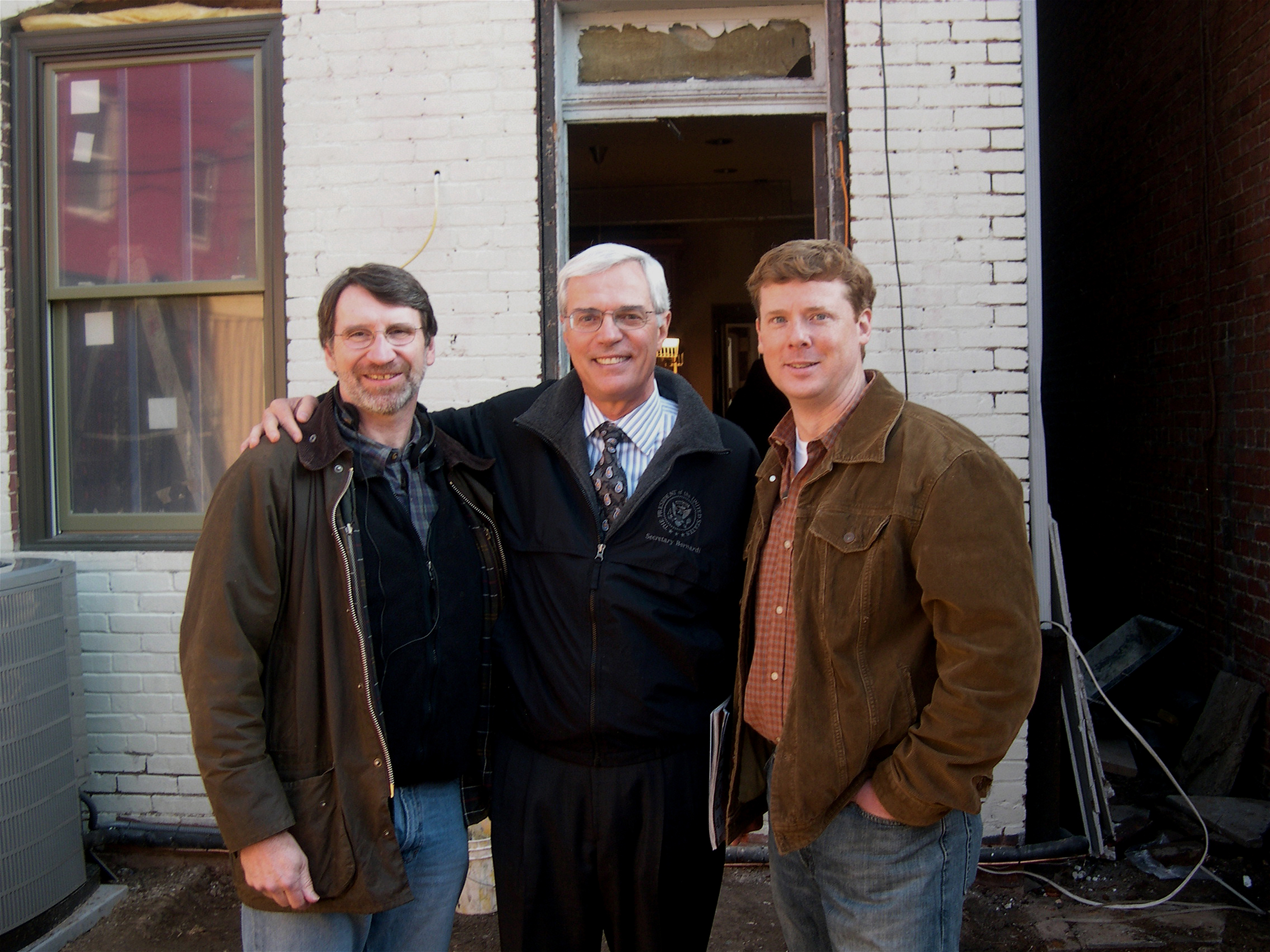
Norm Abram (left), with HUD Deputy Secretary Roy Bernardi (center), and This Old House host Kevin O'Connor (right), at a renovation site in 2006

Beginning with the 2007–2008 season, This Old House and Ask This Old House are presented in a high-definition television format.

To celebrate its 30th anniversary season, This Old House worked with Nuestra Comunidad to renovate a foreclosed home in Boston's Roxbury neighborhood. Nuestra Comunidad is a non-profit development corporation that acquired this 1870s era Second Empire style home from a bank foreclosure.

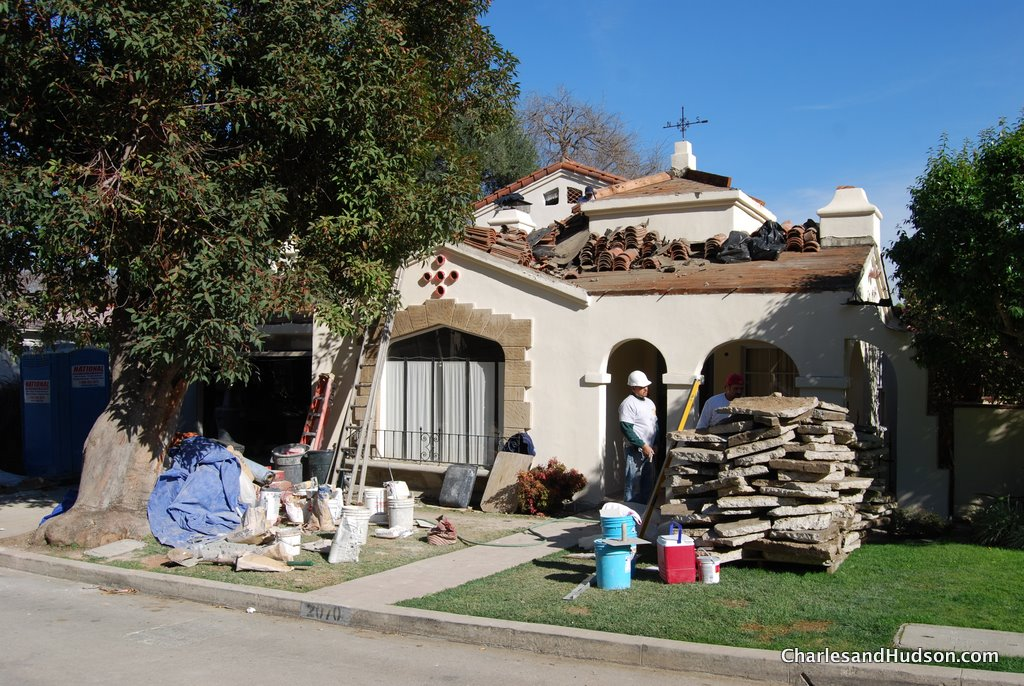
The front of the Los Angeles House project in the Silver Lake neighborhood, Season 32 - 2011.

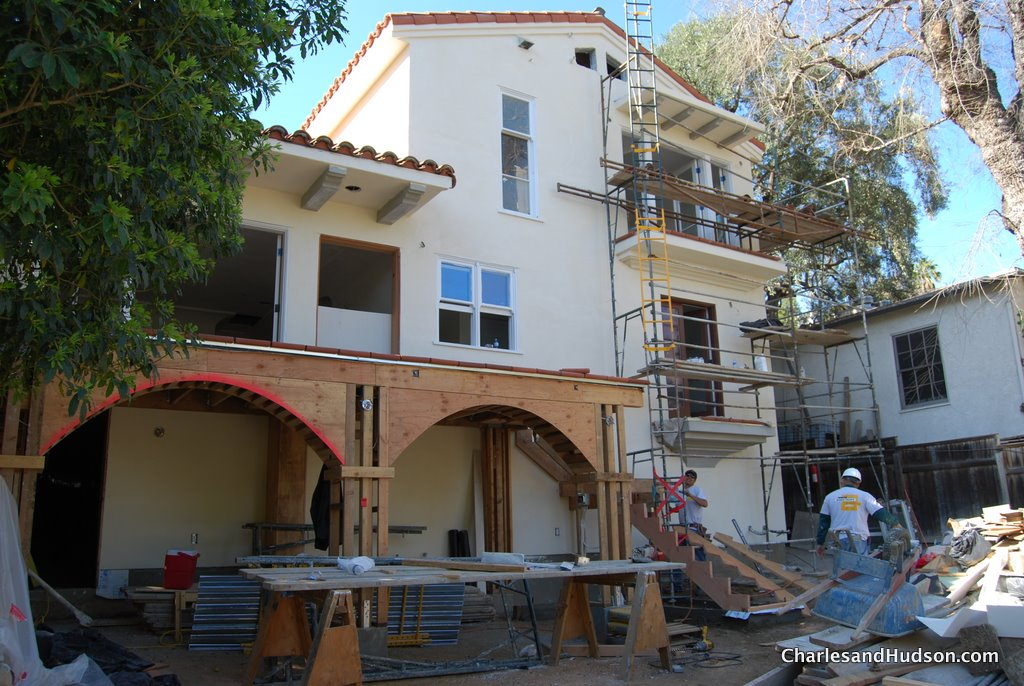
The rear of the Los Angeles House project in the Silver Lake neighborhood, Season 32 - 2011

In 2016, Time Inc. sold This Old House to a joint venture operating as This Old House Ventures, LLC.

To celebrate the 40th season in 2019, a retrospective and revisit of some of the more-notable projects were incorporated into a handful of episodes, with some of the original homeowners providing tours. The first house highlighted was the original 1979 project house in Dorchester.

On March 19, 2021, TZP Growth Partners completed the sale of This Old House Ventures to Roku. All 1,500 episodes of Ask This Old House and This Old House will be made available to owners of Roku streaming products free with ads, and through their dedicated 24/7 Streaming TV channel. PBS will still have rights to air episodes on their platforms.

== Theme song ==
Title	Artist	Composer(s)	Years in use
Louisiana Fairytale	Fats Waller	Gillespie, Parish, Coots	1979–2002
This Old House '97	not credited	Peter Bell	2002–2011
Untitled	not credited	Bill Janovitz	2012–2021
Untitled	not credited	Jordan Critz	2021–present

== Ask This Old House ==
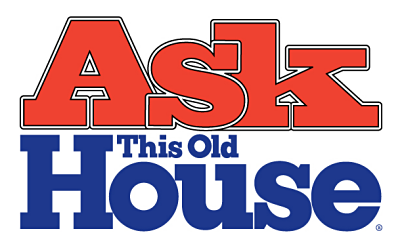
Ask This Old House logo from 2002 to 2013

This Old House logo with Icon

Ask This Old House logo

In 2002, Time Inc. created a spinoff of This Old House entitled Ask This Old House. The show was inspired by a similar feature in This Old House Magazine. It takes place in "the loft" of a rural barn somewhere in the Boston area. The regulars on the show have been Kevin O'Connor, Tom Silva, Richard Trethewey, and Roger Cook. Norm Abram does not appear on Ask This Old House. In later seasons, the spin-off program added landscape expert Jennifer Nawada Evans, eventually replacing Roger Cook, who retired due to unspecified health issues. Other experts making regular appearances include masonry specialist Mark McCullough, paint and finish specialist Mauro Henrique, and electrician Heath Eastman. Ross Trethewey is the show's building engineer and leads the TV segment called "Future House", covering home automation and related technology.

Magazine readers or show viewers submit home repair or improvement questions to the four regulars, who sometimes also invite guest experts to answer more-specialized questions. Most of the questions are answered in the home-base loft, but one or two homeowners in each episode receive an on-site visit from one of the show's hosts. The visiting host assists in starting or completing the task with the homeowners' hands-on participation. Over the course of several seasons, at least one of the traveling team members has been featured in a segment in each of the 50 US states.

Ask This Old House had a program segment called "What Is It?". In this segment, three of the four regulars would offer humorous guesses as to the function of an unusual tool or device, before the fourth regular would reveal its actual use. The segment was so popular that it would sometimes feature notable celebrity guests such as Jimmy Fallon, Nick Offerman, and Richard Mastracchio, the latter of whom broadcast from space. Beginning with the 2007–08 season, Ask This Old House added a "Useful Tip" segment provided by a viewer of the show; this is a revival of a short-lived feature of This Old House when Bob Vila hosted the show. Another occasional feature is "Home Inspection Nightmares", in which viewer-submitted photographs of badly-made or deteriorated home installations are shown and commented on by the hosts.

The opening sequence of Ask This Old House consisted of a GMC van towing the dark-blue Ask This Old House trailer from around Massachusetts before reaching the barn at the end. The 25-second version of the opening sequence showed Tom Silva, as passenger, picking up four coffees from a drive-through. The original version had Steve Thomas as the driver. The 40-second version of the opening sequence showed Kevin O'Connor as the driver. In both versions, after the van pulls into the barn driveway, the footage cuts to Richard Trethewey handing out the coffees to the other three regulars. The original opening sequence has since been modified, and still shows the travels of the small trailer which has the Ask This Old House logo prominently displayed.

Ask This Old House has been nominated for five Emmy Awards.

== This Old House magazine ==
This Old House magazine was first published in 1995 by Time Inc. and discontinued in 2024. Published eight times per year, the magazine had a circulation of over 950,000 and reached nearly 6 million consumers each month. Nathan Stamos was the publisher. As of April 1, 2016, Susan Wyland, best known for her tenure on Time Inc.'s Real Simple magazine, became the magazine's editor in chief, replacing Scott Omelianuk, who had been editor for 12 years.

ThisOldHouse.com is the brand's website and features how-to projects and inspiration and tips for homeowners. The website also serves as the online destination for the television show and includes bios on the cast, information on all of the home projects, and live webcams of the current house projects.

== Inside This Old House ==

A short-lived spin-off of the This Old House franchise, Inside This Old House, was shown primarily on the A&E Network and originally aired from 2003 to 2004. The show was very much like Ask This Old House: it was shot mainly in the "loft", was hosted by O'Connor, and featured the regular experts listed above and also Abram (master carpenter). However, unlike Ask This Old House, usually one or two experts were used throughout the episode and a specific theme was discussed. The theme was usually a particular topic (e.g., landscaping, installing doors, etc.). Along with the in-house expert, and sometimes a guest expert, clips were shown of past episodes of This Old House (mainly the original episodes with Bob Vila) to further illustrate the point as well as revisit past projects undertaken over the previous 25 years to see what the homeowners have done since airing. Each episode ended with a segment called "Inside Out", which featured one of the two guest commentators, Jimmy Dunn and Doreen Vigue, and one of the experts, with a brief and comedic overview of what was discussed on the show.

== This Old House: Trade School ==
In 2017, The CW network began airing a new spin-off, This Old House: Trade School. It is also hosted by Kevin O'Connor and is repurposed to meet E/I regulations for people 13 to 16 years old as part of the One Magnificent Morning program block. Trade School features the stars of This Old House, Norm Abram, Tom Silva, Richard Trethewey, and Roger Cook, showing what it is like to work alongside these seasoned pros.

== This First House ==
In September 2025, a new spinoff of This Old House was announced by Roku. The new spinoff This First House follows younger homebuyers as they find their first home. It will premiere in 2026.

== Personnel ==
=== Current cast ===
As of 2022, the cast is as follows:

- Kevin O'Connor (host)
- Tom Silva (general contractor)
- Richard Trethewey (plumbing and heating expert)
- Jenn Nawada (landscape contractor)
- Mauro Henrique (painter)
- Mark McCullough (mason)
- Heath Eastman (electrician)
- Charlie Silva (home builder)
- Ross Trethewey (building engineer)
- Nathan Gilbert (carpenter)
- Lee Gilliam (landscape contractor)

=== Former cast ===
- Norm Abram (master carpenter, 1979–2022)
- Roger Cook (landscape contractor, 1988–2020, died in 2024);
- Steve Thomas (host, 1989–2003)
- Bob Vila (host, 1979–1988)

=== Hosts ===
The first host of This Old House was designer-builder and remodeling expert Bob Vila. He hosted the program from 1979 to 1989, when he left This Old House to become a spokesman for Sears Roebuck & Company. From 1990 to 2005 he hosted the spinoff program Bob Vila's Home Again, and from 2005 to 2007 he hosted Bob Vila.

For the original program, Vila was followed by Steve Thomas, who hosted from 1989 to 2003. In 2003, Thomas left the show and was replaced by current host Kevin O'Connor.
