= Mitch Seavey =

American dog musher (born 1959)

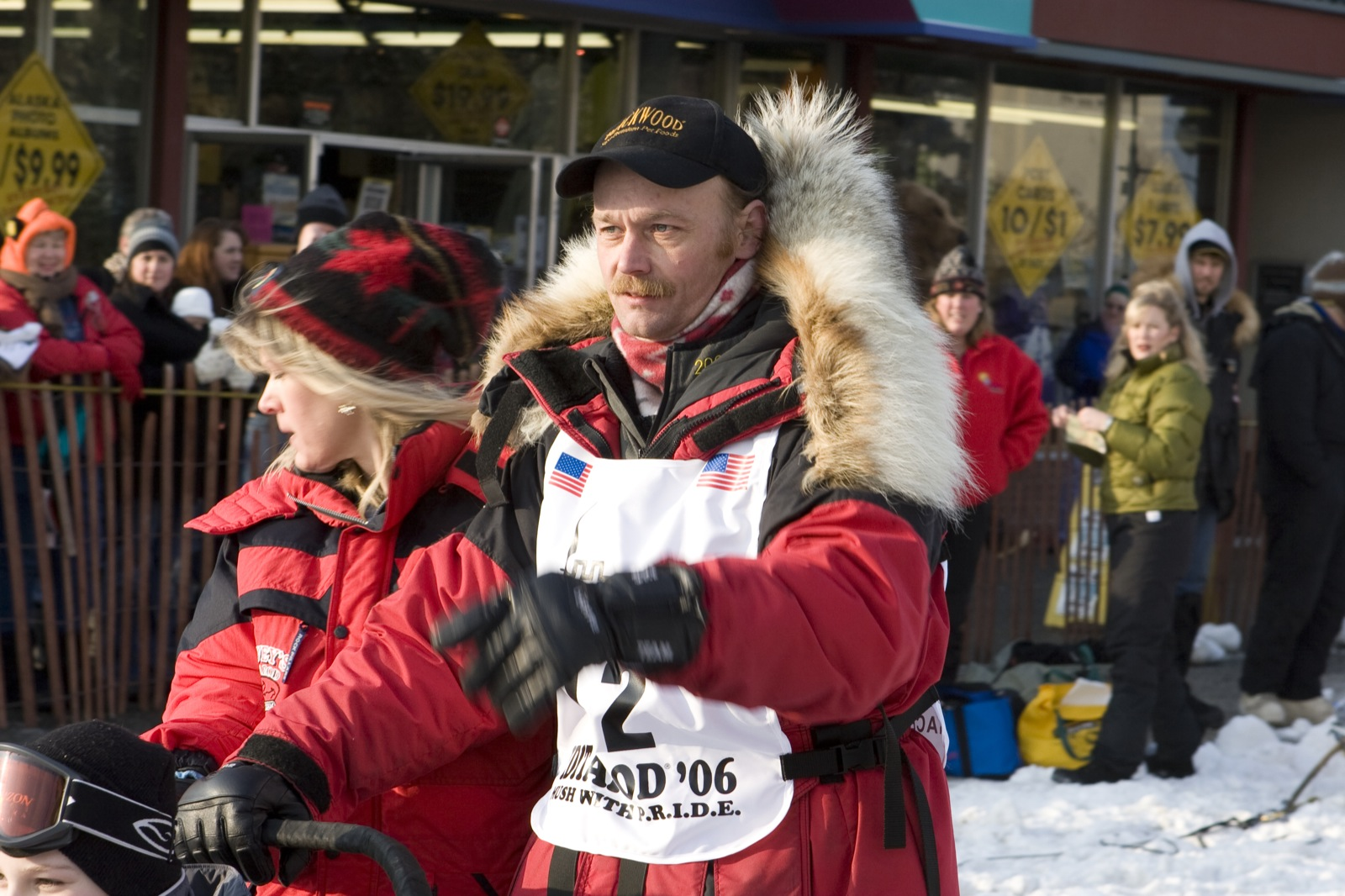
Mitch Seavey at the ceremonial start of the 2006 Iditarod.

Mitch Seavey (born 1959) is an American dog musher, who won the Iditarod Trail Sled Dog Race across the U.S. state of Alaska in 2004, 2013 and 2017. At age 57, Seavey is the oldest person to win the Iditarod in 2017 (surpassing his record in 2013 at age 53). His son, Dallas Seavey, won the 2012, 2014, 2015 2016, 2021 and 2024 Iditarod; his 2012 win made him the youngest winner ever.

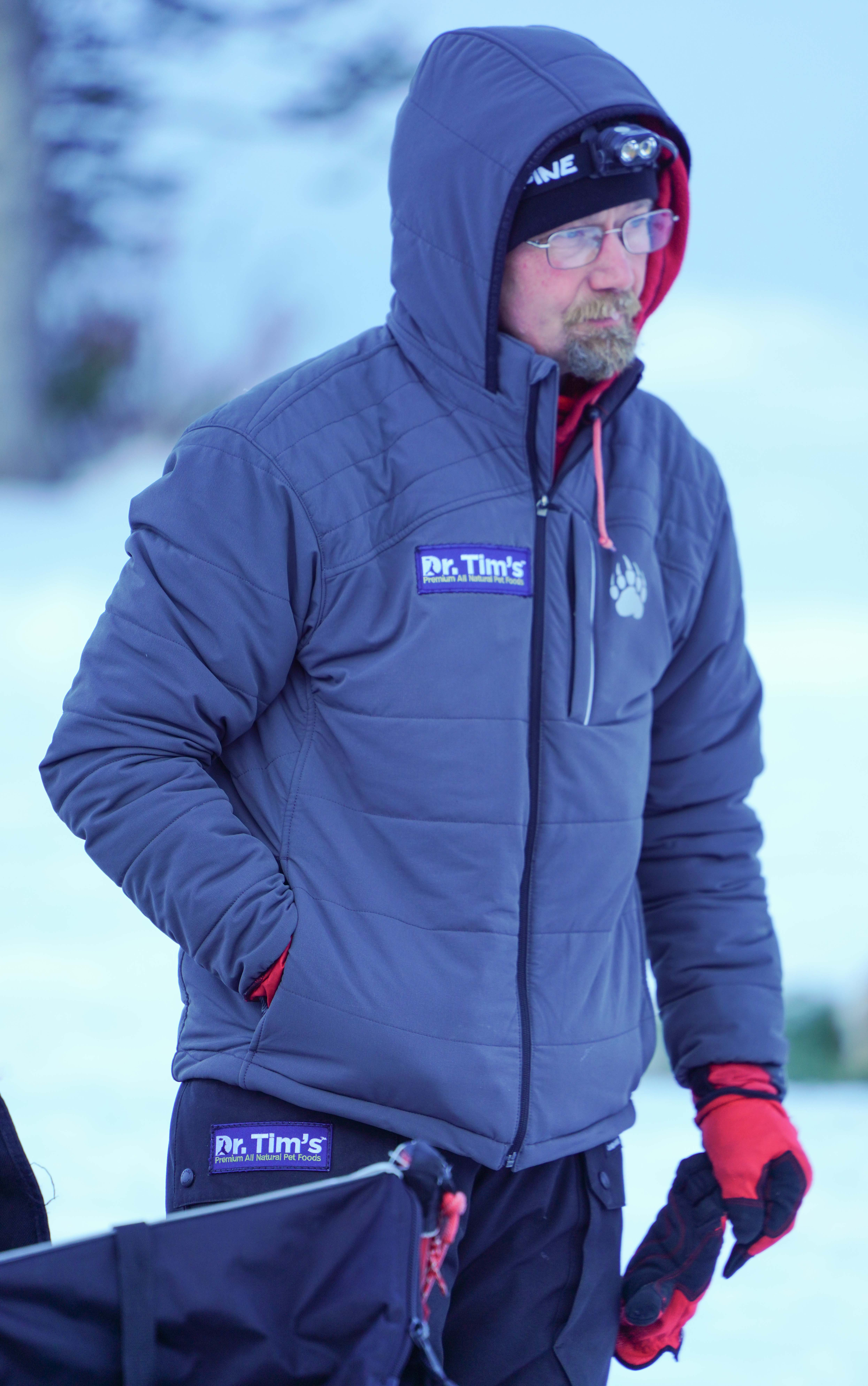
Mitch Seavey at Rainy Pass Checkpoint during the Iditarod 2020

Seavey's father, Dan Seavey, competed in the first two Iditarod sled dog races in 1973 and 1974, as well as the 1997 and 2012 races. Mitch Seavey competed in his first Iditarod in 1982, and has completed every race since 1995. In the 1995 race, he started in Seward, and completed the entire length of the Iditarod Trail. He won the 2004 Iditarod in 9 days, 12 hours, 20 minutes, and 22 seconds. He has also won the Copper Basin 300 twice, the Klondike 300, the Kusko 300, and the Grand Portage Passage race in the state of Minnesota once. In 2008 he won the historic All Alaska Sweepstakes race with a record-breaking time of 64 hours, 29 minutes and 45 seconds. Seavey was born in Minnesota, and grew up in Seward, Alaska. He lives in Sterling, Alaska with his wife Janine. His son Danny resides in Seward where he runs the family business, Ididaride Sled Dog Tours. Danny has run in the Iditarod, and in the 2005 Iditarod both Tyrell and Dallas competed. Dallas won the 2012 Iditarod, becoming the youngest winner; Mitch became the oldest to win in 2013. In 2015, Mitch and Dallas became the first father and son duo in Iditarod history to claim the top two finishing positions of the race with Dallas arriving at the finish line first and Mitch coming in second.

Seavey runs a dog sled tour out of Seward, Alaska which allows people from all over the country to experience dog sledding without having to run the Iditarod.

Year	Position	Time (h:min:s)
2004	1st	9 days, 12:20:22
2005	3rd	9 days, 19:20:58
2012	7th	9 days, 13:10:58
2013	1st	9 days, 7:39:56
2014	3rd	8 days, 16:39:40
2015	2nd	8 days, 22:22:56
2016	2nd	8 days, 12:05:25
2017	1st	8 days, 03:40:13
