= Renovation Nation =

- Starring: Steve Thomas
- Country of origin: United States
- No. of seasons: 2
- No. of episodes: 66

Production
- Running time: 60 minutes (with commercials)

Original release
- Network: Planet Green
- Release: June 4, 2008 – February 4, 2010

Renovation Nation is a green home building show starring Steve Thomas that aired on the now-defunct Planet Green channel in the United States. First airing on June 4, 2008, the show was produced for two seasons, totaling 66 episodes, before being cancelled.

A typical episode consisted of Thomas visiting homes that featured various types of green building projects, be they in new construction projects or in, as the title suggests, green renovations of older living spaces. Frequently, homeowners and residences would be featured across multiple episodes, as each homeowner might have been involved in multiple projects such as alternative energy generation, energy conservation and eco-friendly construction techniques and materials.
