= Sara Snow =

American TV personality and organic foods activist

Sara Cathrine Redmond
- Born: 20 July 1976 (age 48); Ann Arbor, Michigan
- Other names: Sara Snow
- Occupation: Television presenter

Sara Carinne Redmond (born 20 July 1976) is an American-born organic foods advocate, best known as the star of the Fit TV show Get Fresh With Sara Snow.

Snow discusses global warming, the harmful effects of meat production, the benefits of recycling, the environmental benefit of going organic, the vegetarian ethic, and, to a lesser extent, the ethics of veganism. She is a strong supporter of the Gaia hypothesis.

== Early life ==
Redmond was born in Ann Arbor, Michigan to Tim and Pattie Redmond. Her parents are credited with helping to bring the natural food movement to America to help mainstream "alternative" foods, such as soy milk, through their company Eden Foods.

The Redmonds put great emphasis on the concept "you are what you eat". They wanted their children to eat as healthily and as naturally as possible. This concept is later explored in Sara's speeches and on Get Fresh with Sara Snow. The family believes that eating a raw foods diet, with foods grown close to where one lives, is better for the body and the environment.
