= Steve Thomas (television) =

American television personality and author (born 1952)

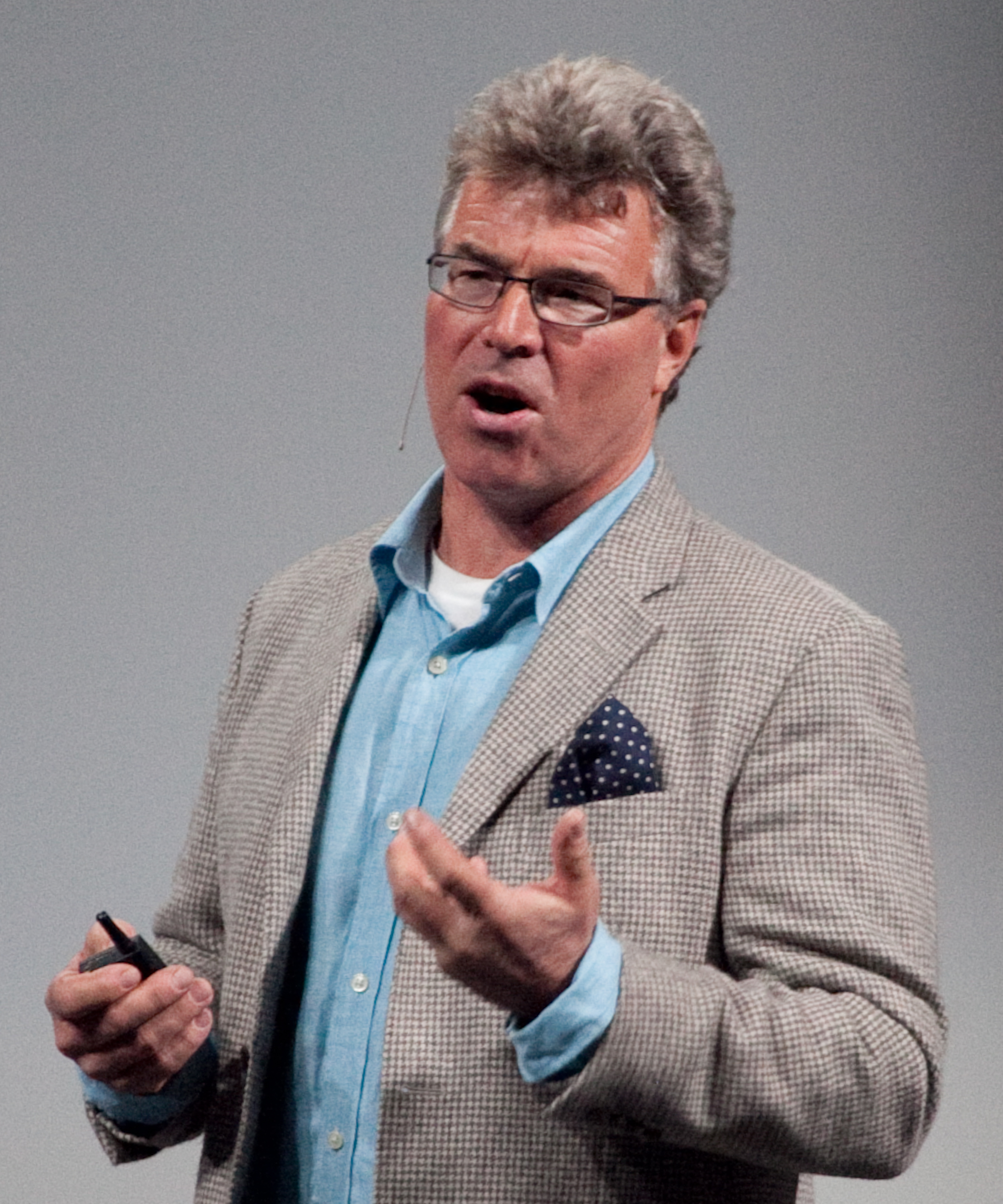
- Thomas at the UP Experience 2010
- Born: 1952 (age 73–74); Pomona, California
- Education: Evergreen State College, Olympia, Washington
- Occupations: Television show host, sailor, builder
- Years active: 1989 - present
- Known for: Host of This Old House, 1989–2003; 3 books
- Spouse: Evelyn Blum (m. 1980)
- Awards: 1997–1998 Daytime Emmy Award
- Website: www.stevethomashome.com

Stephen Thomas (born 1952) is an American author, builder, sailor, and television personality. He was the host of the PBS home renovation series This Old House from 1989 to 2003 and of Renovation Nation on Discovery's Planet Green channel from 2008 to 2010 until its cancellation.

== Biography ==
Thomas was born in 1952 in Pomona, California, and is the eldest of six children. His father—who used to buy and repair old houses to accommodate his growing family and served in the Pacific theatre in World War II—influenced his interest in construction as well as sailing. He is the grandson of Episcopal missionary to the Alaskan Arctic, Rooney Thomas.

=== Education ===
Thomas received his bachelor's degree in philosophy from The Evergreen State College in Olympia, Washington. While at Evergreen, he supported himself as a painting contractor and carpenter.

=== Sailing and research ===
At the age of 13, Thomas decided he wanted to go sailing, so he bought his first sailboat. In 1977, Thomas worked as a carpenter on a 75-foot (23 m) ketch under construction in Antibes, France. He also logged many nautical miles sailing a 43-foot (13 m) wooden sloop from England to San Francisco via the Panama Canal, Galapagos Islands, Marquesas, and Hawaii as part of a business venture.

In the early 1980s, inspired by an old dream, Thomas journeyed across the Pacific to Yap and then Satawal to learn the satawalese language and the ancient sailing technique of the "Talk of Navigation" under Mau Piailug. In addition to publishing the book The Last Navigator documenting this experience, Thomas' research is housed in The Steve Thomas Traditional Micronesian Navigation Collection 1983-1989 at the Manoa Library at the University of Hawaii.

=== Television ===
In 1989, Thomas returned to Satawal where he filmed the documentary The Last Navigator with Piailug for the PBS series Adventure.

In 1989, while researching his next book, on his family's history in the Alaskan Arctic, Thomas was approached by people from the PBS series This Old House who had already screened more than 400 candidates. He was cast to replace Bob Vila and hosted the show from 1989 through 2003.

For fourteen years, Thomas appeared alongside Norm Abram on This Old House demystifying the process of home renovation in New England and across the country including a season in the UK. This included accompanying Abram to The New Yankee Workshop to assist in building custom projects relative to the seasons' subject house. Portrayed as buddies, their on-screen partnership was peppered with tongue-in-cheek banter. In addition to interviewing contractors demonstrating trade techniques, he would frequently go "on assignment" to museums or historical and architectural locales to educate television audiences. Cast and crew of the show described Thomas as bringing an "optimistic," "adventurous," and "wide-eyed wonder" to the show.

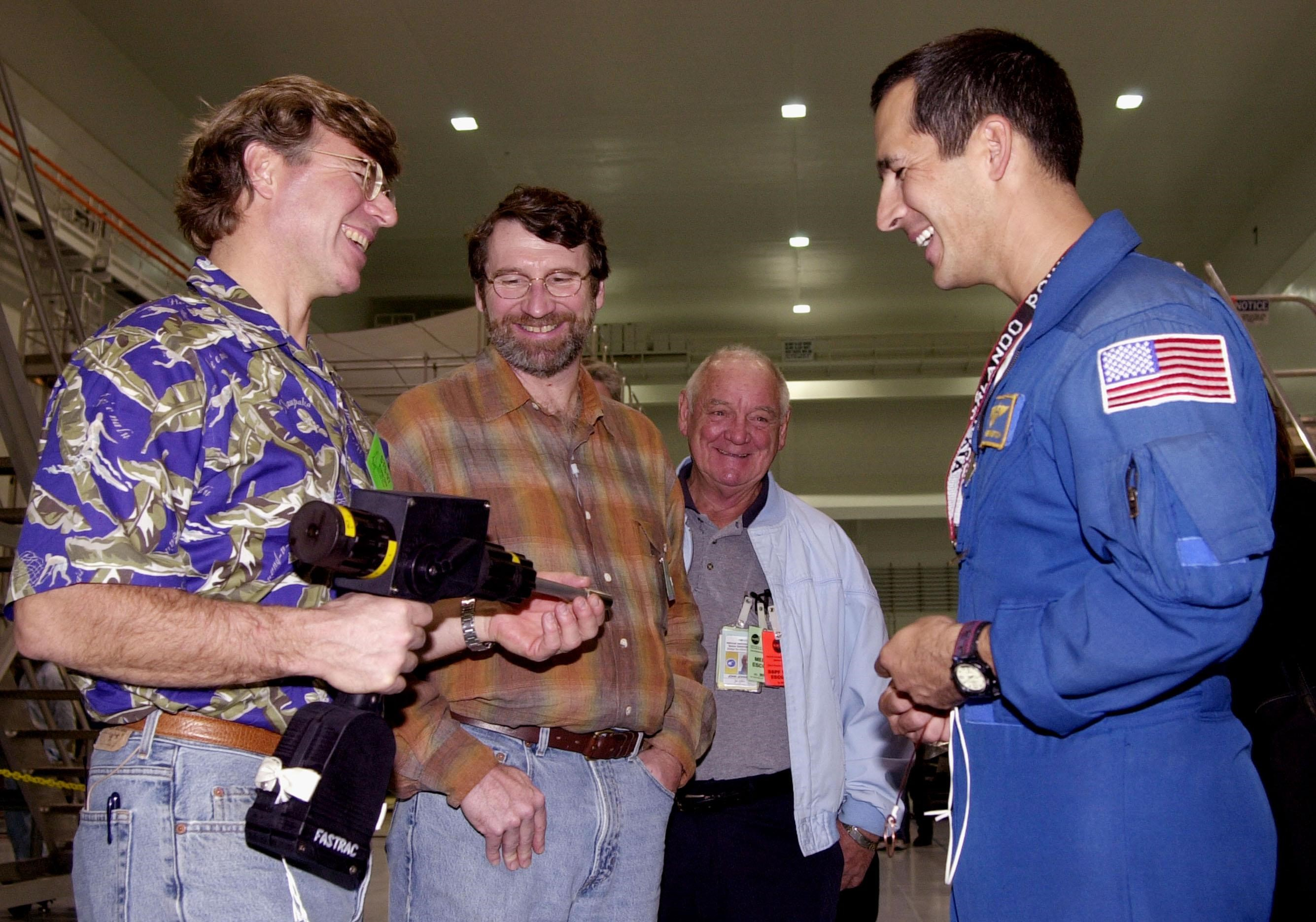
Steve Thomas, with space drill, Norm Abram, Johnny Johnson, and Astronaut John Herrington at the Kennedy Space Center for This Old House, 2000

Since leaving This Old House Thomas has contributed to programming on The History Channel, hosting and producing the Save Our History series, including one program showing George Washington's estate, and another in the Aleutian Islands of Alaska.

=== Habitat for Humanity International ===
Thomas first was involved with Habitat in the early 90s following their stories on This Old House and later partnered with them for a five-part series for Renovation Nation. He currently is Spokesman and Ambassador for Habitat for Humanity International with special emphasis on Women Build, Builders Blitz, and ReStore.

=== Public speaking and personal appearances ===
Thomas is a popular speaker on green renovation for builders and homeowners. He is especially interested in green, energy efficient, and low maintenance technologies and materials. He has appeared on television shows such as The Early Show on CBS, The Oprah Winfrey Show, and Jon & Kate Plus 8.

=== Renovation and construction ===
In 1980, Thomas moved with his family to Salem, Massachusetts, where he renovated an 1836 Colonial revival in a seaport north of Boston. He now resides in St. George, Maine, with his wife and son Sam. He owns his own construction company, Steve Thomas Builders. A recent project involved renovating a cottage and building a timber-frame barn on Hupper island off the coast of Maine. This became a two-part special on Renovation Nation. He renovated a 1,000 square foot adobe in Santa Fe, NM, which was the cover story in the January 2013 issue of Su Casa magazine. From 2013 to 2015, he renovated Sea Cove Cottage in the middle of a fishing village in Maine.

== Awards ==
Thomas received the 1997–1998 Daytime Emmy Award of 'Outstanding Service Show Host' for This Old House, plus nine nominations for the same category.

== Books ==
- Thomas, Steve (1987). The Last Navigator : A Young Man, an Ancient Mariner, the Secret of the Sea. ISBN 1-4392-3349-7.
- Thomas, Steve (1992). This Old House Kitchens: A Guide to Design and Renovation. ISBN 0-3168-4107-2.
- Thomas, Steve (1992). This Old House Bathrooms: A Guide to Design and Renovation. ISBN 0-3168-4110-2.
- Thomas, Steve (1999). This Old House Guide to American Houses. ISBN 0-3168-4140-4.
- Thomas, Steve (2023). The Last Navigator : A Young Man, an Ancient Mariner, the Secrets of the Sea. ISBN 978-0-7892-1511-6.
