= Morash =

Morash is a surname, an Americanized form of German Morasch, which in turn is a variant of Morast, a toponymic surname meaning "marsh" or "swamp". Notable people with the surname include:

- Kerry Morash (born 1958), Canadian politician and safety coordinator
- Marian Morash (fl. 1959–present), American cookbook author, chef, restaurateur and television presenter
- Russell Morash (1936–2024), American television producer and director
- Shirley Morash, Canadian curler
- Allan Moreash (also spelled Morash; 1857–1928), Canadian merchant and politician
