= Old Sturbridge Village =

Living museum in Massachusetts

Coordinates: 42°06′31.88″N 72°05′55.31″W

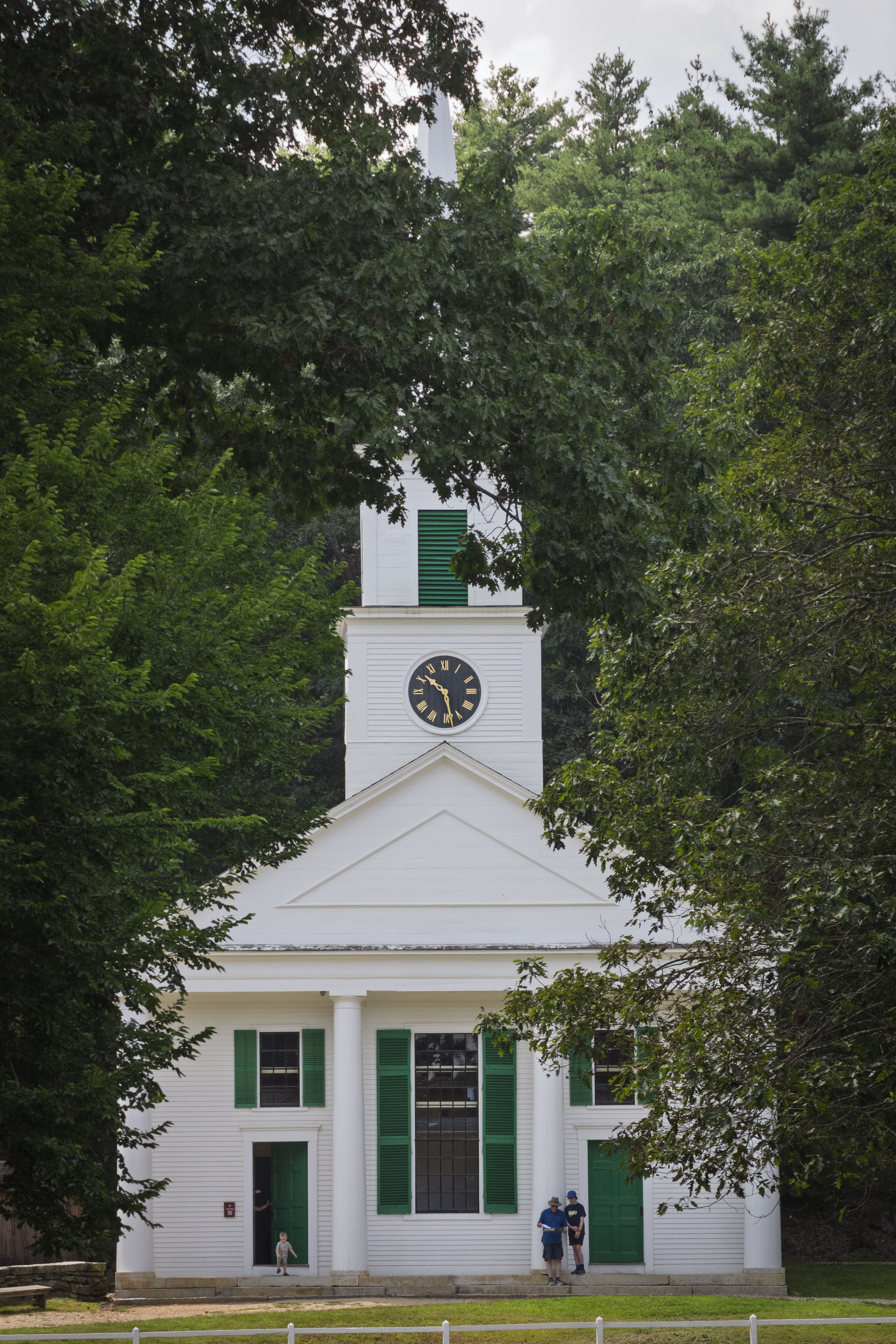
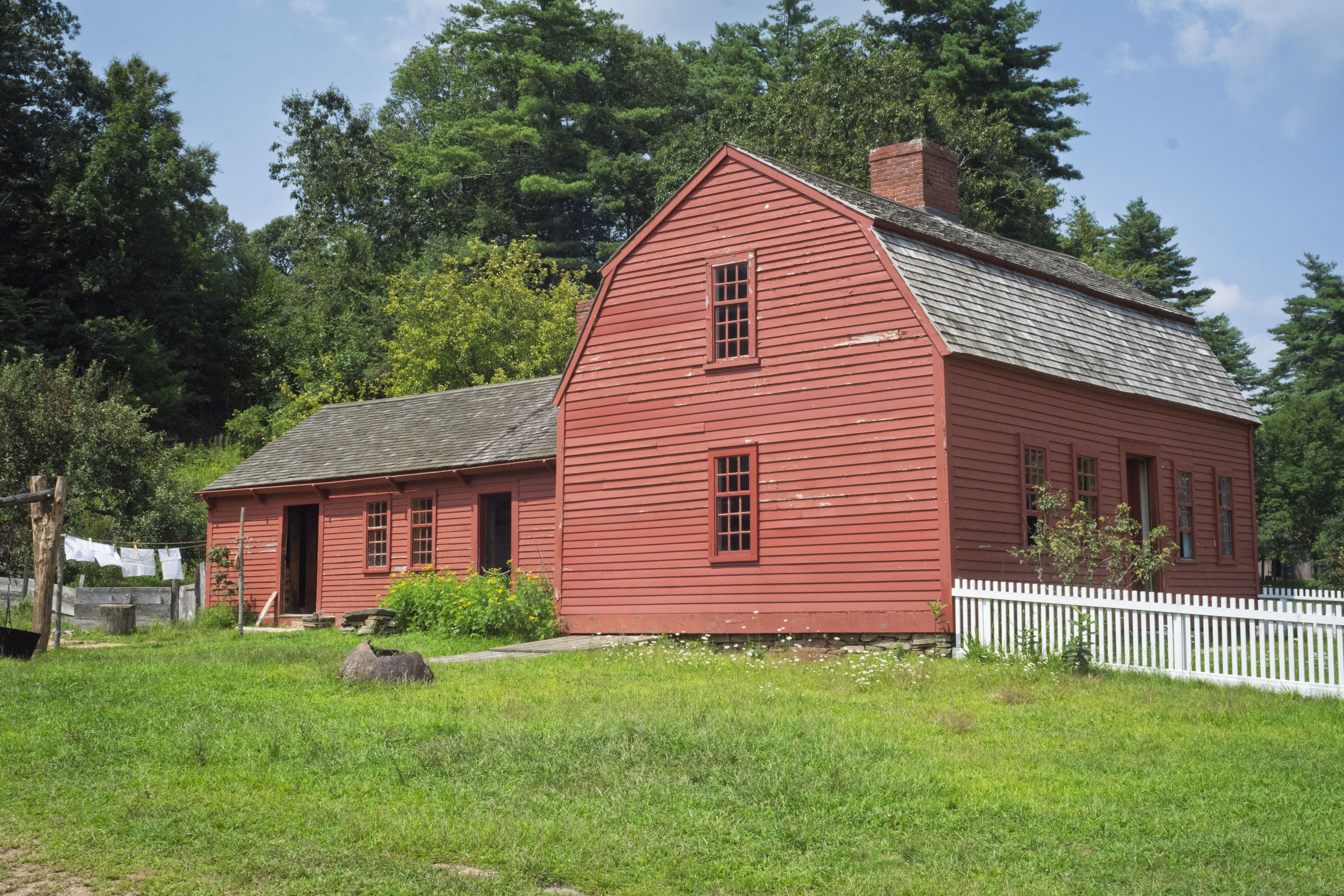
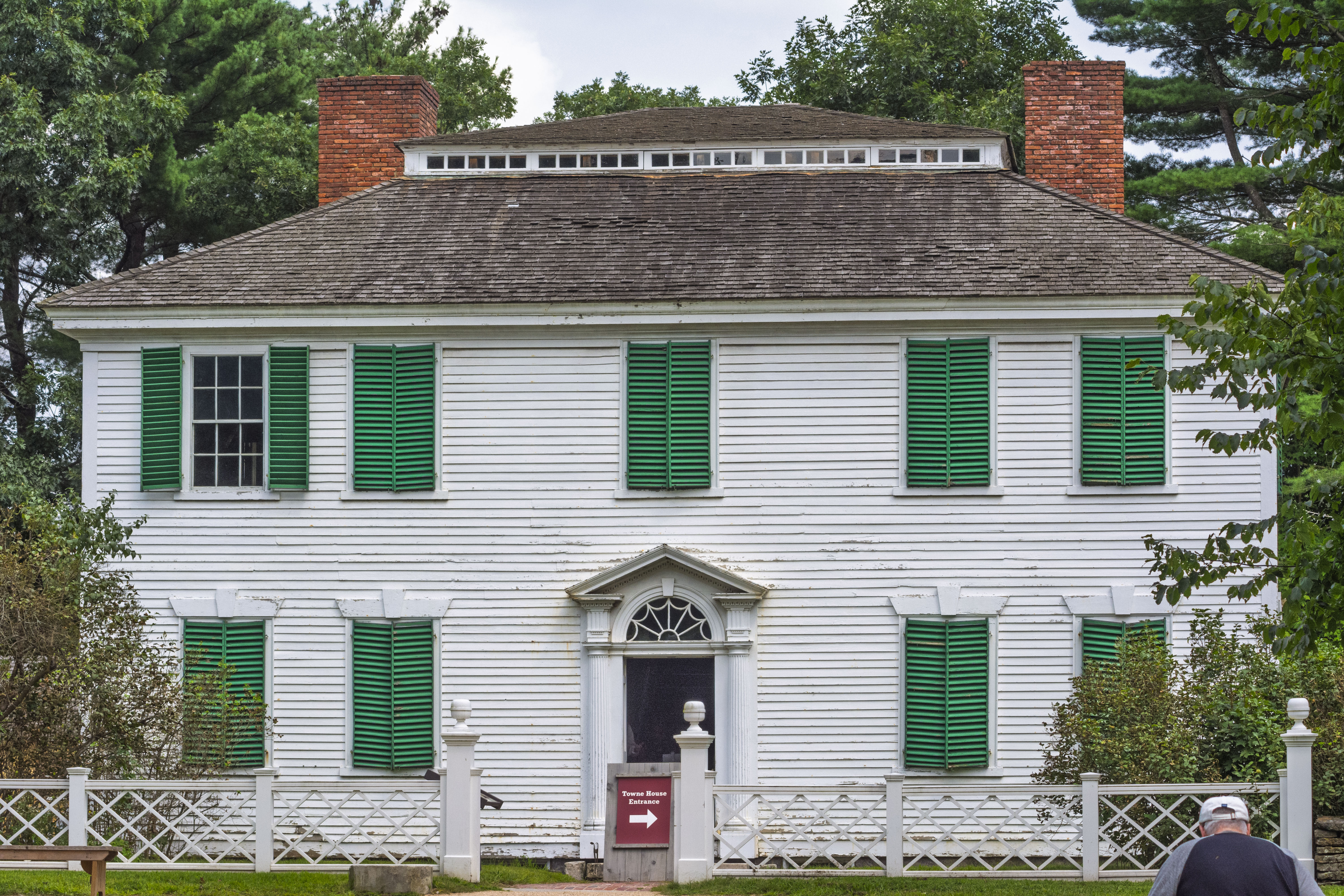
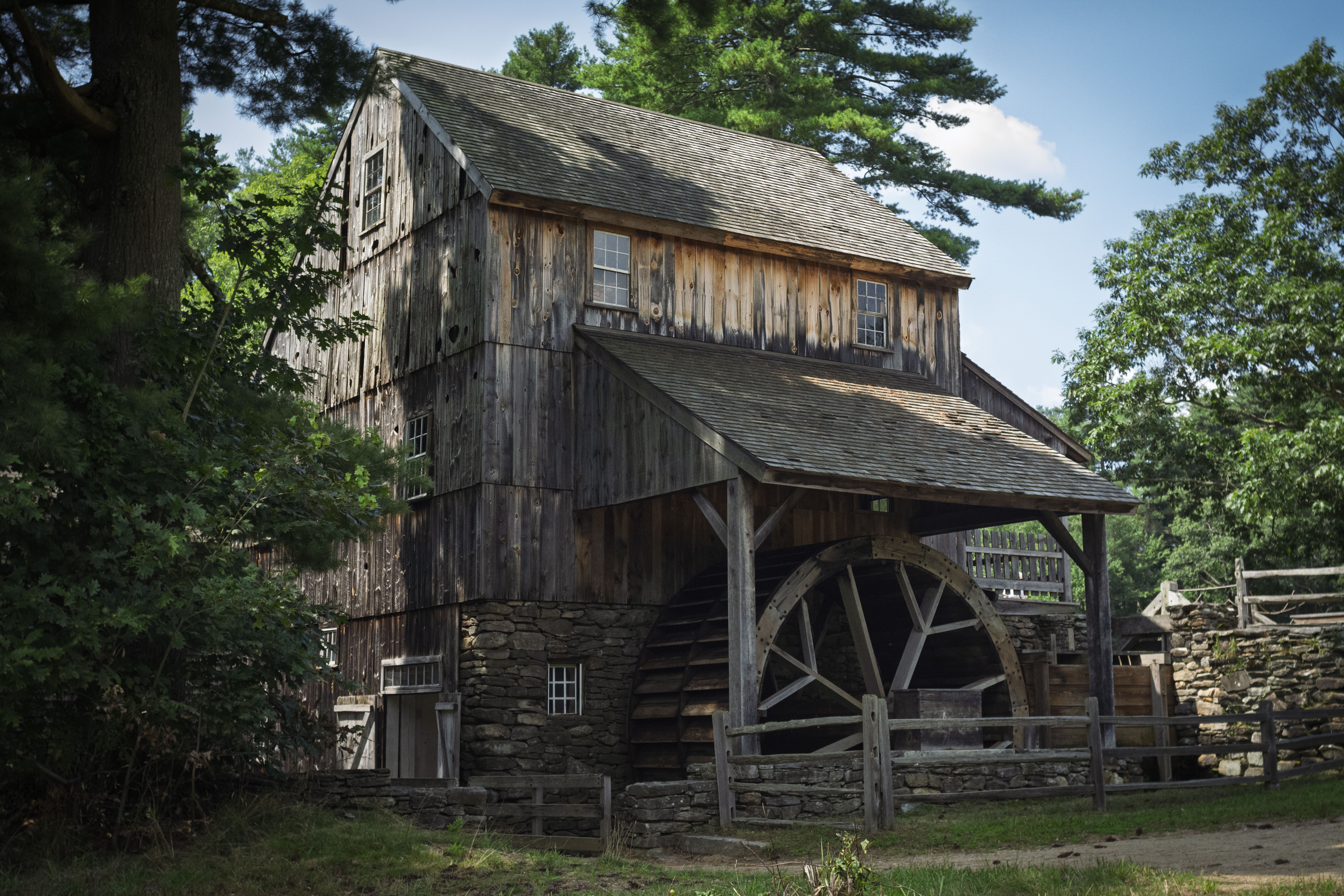
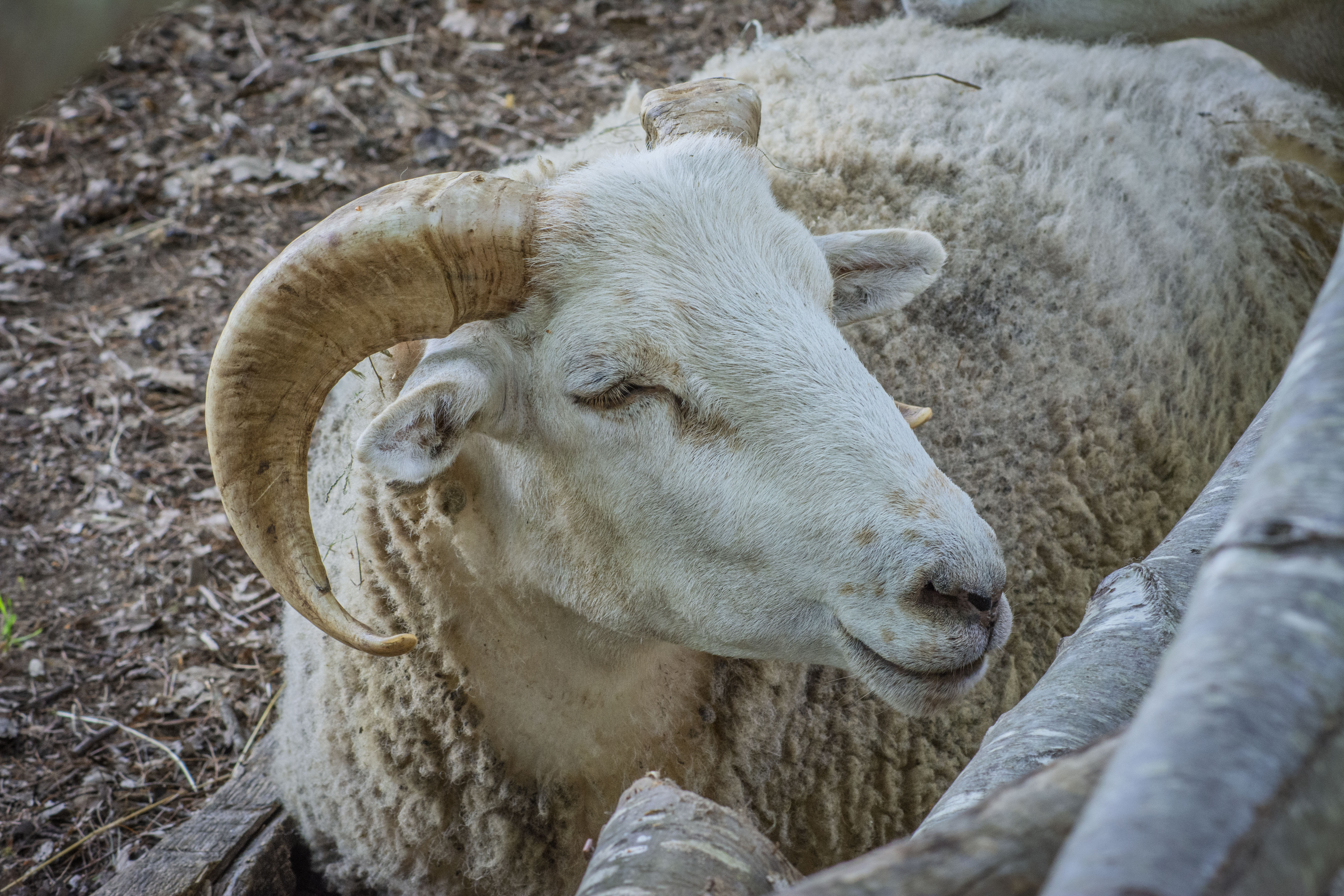
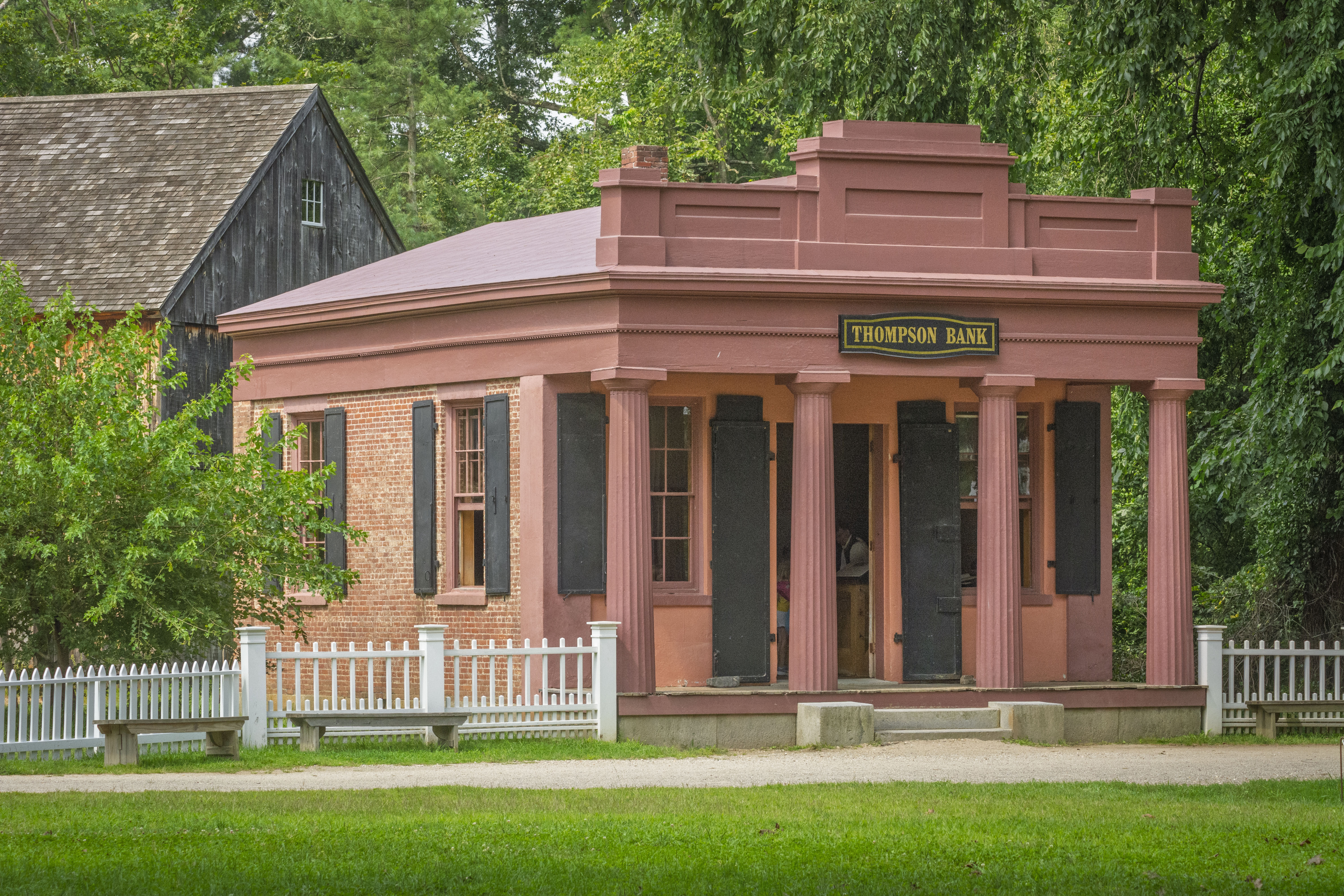
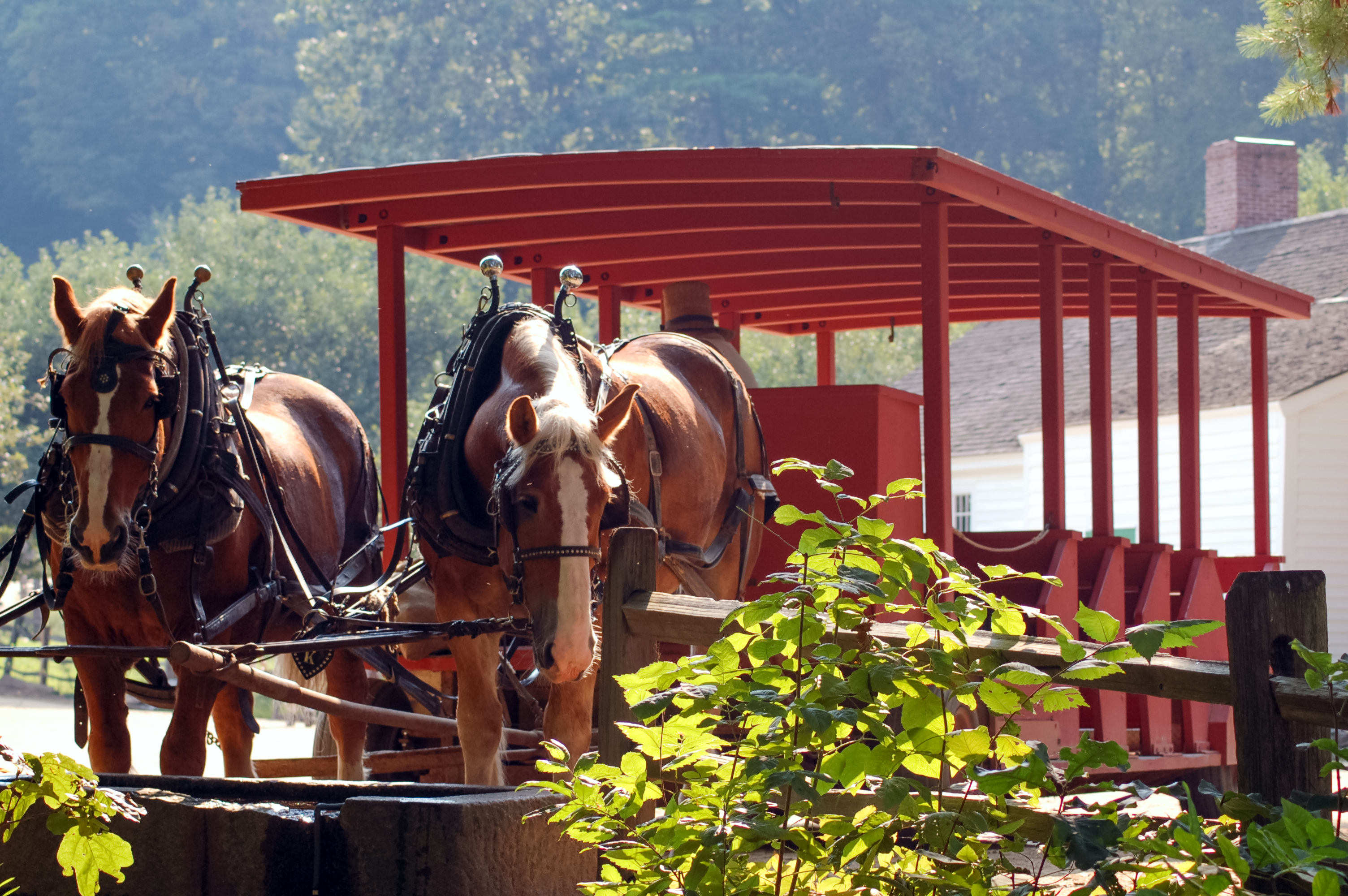
- Center Meetinghouse Freeman Farm Salem Towne House Gristmill Sheep at Fenno Barn Thompson Bank Horses at trough
- Interactive map of the Old Sturbridge Village area

Old Sturbridge Village is a living museum located in Sturbridge, Massachusetts, which recreates life in rural New England during the 1790s through 1830s. It is the largest living museum in New England, covering more than 200 acres (80 ha). The Village includes 59 antique buildings, three water-powered mills, and a working farm. Third-person costumed interpreters demonstrate and interpret 19th-century arts, crafts, and agricultural work. The museum is popular among tourists and for educational field trips.

== History ==
In the early 19th century, the land on which Old Sturbridge Village stands was a farm owned by David Wight which included a sawmill, a gristmill, and a millpond. The millpond was dug in 1795 and still powers the mills today. In 1795, Wight's son went to Boston to conduct some business on behalf of his father. While in Boston, he bought tickets to the Harvard Lottery which was a fund-raising technique for Harvard College. He won $5,000 (equivalent to $102,926 in today's dollars). He gave his father money to pay off the mortgage on his farm and logged the timber of the cedar swamp which today is the millpond. After the logging was complete, they dug the pond with a team of oxen and a scoop. This entire process took two and a half years.

George Washington Wells started a small spectacle shop in Southbridge, Massachusetts, in the 1840s which became the American Optical Company. His sons Channing, Albert (called "AB"), and Cheney followed him into the business, which continued to expand. In 1926, AB began to shop for antiques, and this influenced Cheney to collect early American timepieces and Channing to collect fine furniture. By the early 1930s, AB had more than 45 rooms full of antiques in his Southbridge home.

The Wells family and others formed the Wells Historical Museum in 1935, gave it title to the various collections, and charged it with the care and exhibition of the artifacts. In July 1936, the museum's trustees met to determine how the collections would best be presented to the public. AB wanted to create a small cluster of buildings in a horseshoe around a common, but his son George B. proposed creating a live village with operating shops and a source of water power. Within a week of the meeting, the museum purchased David Wight's farm and soon after hired Malcolm Watkins as the first curator of the museum, which they called Quinnebaug Village in honor of the river. Architect Arthur Shurcliff was called in to help lay out a suitable country landscape. By 1941, the Fitch House, the Miner Grant Store, and the Richardson House (now the Parsonage) were on the common and the Gristmill was in operation.

After a pause for World War II, George B.'s wife Ruth became acting director of the Village. They changed its name to Old Sturbridge Village and opened it on June 8, 1946. Attendance climbed, mostly through word of mouth. In a 1950 article in The Saturday Evening Post, the village was featured as "The Town That Wants to be Out of Date". By 1955, it acquired the Meetinghouse from the Fiskdale neighborhood of Sturbridge, the Salem Towne House from Charlton, Massachusetts, the Fenno House, the Friends Meetinghouse, the Pliny Freeman House, the Printing Office, and the District School.

On August 18, 1955, gale-force winds and a torrential downpour from Hurricane Diane created flood waters that broke dams in surrounding towns and flooded the Village, stranding 15 staff members. The Freeman Farmhouse was flooded and the covered bridge was swept off its foundation. Helicopters kept staff members supplied for three days until the waters receded. The damage was estimated to be $250,000 in 1955, but Village employees managed to re-open the Village in just nine days.

== Structures and exhibits ==
Old Sturbridge Village has more than 40 structures, including restored buildings purchased and relocated from around New England, as well as some authentic reconstructions, and the entire village is divided into three main sections. The Center Village represents the center of town, with the town green as its focal point. Countryside consists of outlying farms and shops. The Mill Neighborhood features various commercial structures that rely upon the millpond for their power.

=== Center Village ===
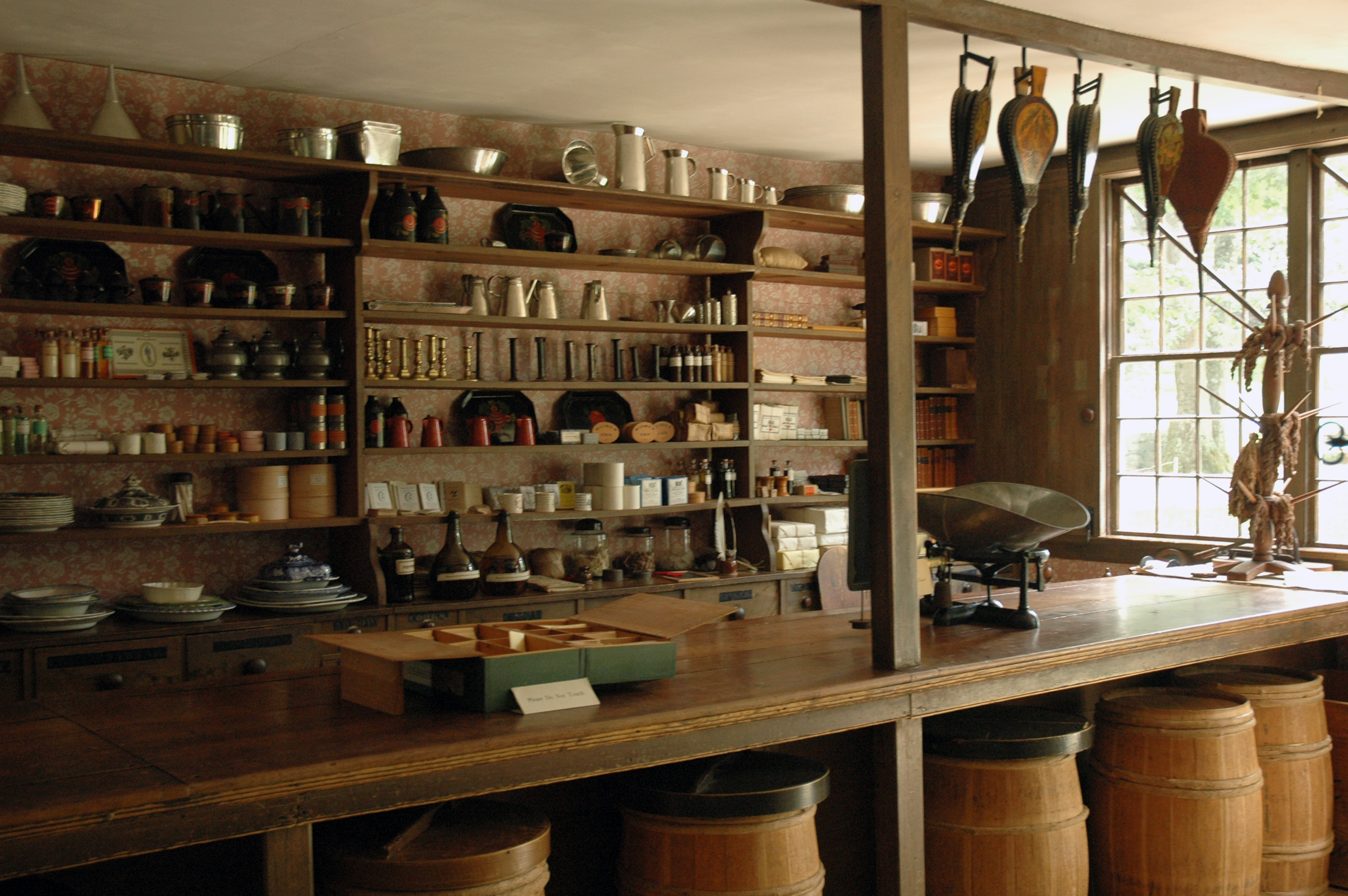
Interior of the Asa Knight Store from Vermont.

The Center Village contains:

- Friends Meetinghouse – a meetinghouse of the Religious Society of Friends, known as Quakers
- Center Meetinghouse – churches often served as a location for town meetings, elections, lectures, and political events
- Tin Shop – tin imported from England was used to make a variety of household goods
- Salem Towne House – a prosperous farmer's home
- Law Office – a small, free-standing office of a lawyer
- Parsonage – the home of a Congregational minister and his family
- Asa Knight Store – a country store, transported from its original location in Vermont
- Thompson Bank – a bank that was originally located in Thompson, Connecticut
- Fenno House – a historic house with exhibits that highlight domestic textile production
- Fitch House – a residence exhibit that highlights children and family life
- Small House – a small home based on those of less affluent families and renters, which was built from scratch at the village using period-appropriate techniques.
- Printing Office
- Cider Mill – a horse-powered mill for the production of hard cider
- Shoe Shop – a historic ten footer, which was a small backyard shop structure built in the 18th and 19th centuries in New England to serve as a shoemaker's shop. Such structures were usually 10 feet (3.0 m) by 10 feet (3.0 m) in area. They were forerunners of the large shoe factories that developed in New England later in the 19th century.
- Town Pound – for the confinement of livestock found wandering loose
- Bullard Tavern – an early 19th-century tavern room
- The Stage Coach – a stage coach marked "Hartford & Worcester" which makes trips through Center Village

=== The Countryside ===
The Countryside section contains:

- Freeman Farmhouse – a typical New England farm of approximately 70 acres (28 ha) with barn, outbuildings, and fields
- Blacksmith Shop – a shop where farm implements and other hardware were made and repaired and horses and oxen were shod
- Bixby House – the home of the blacksmith
- Cooper Shop – where wooden barrels, buckets, and pails were made
- Pottery Shop – New England potters made utilitarian items out of local clay, such as milkpans, mugs, crocks, flowerpots, and mixing bowls
- District School – a typical publicly funded one-room school
- Covered Bridge – Covered bridges extended the longevity of wooden bridges in the harsh New England weather.

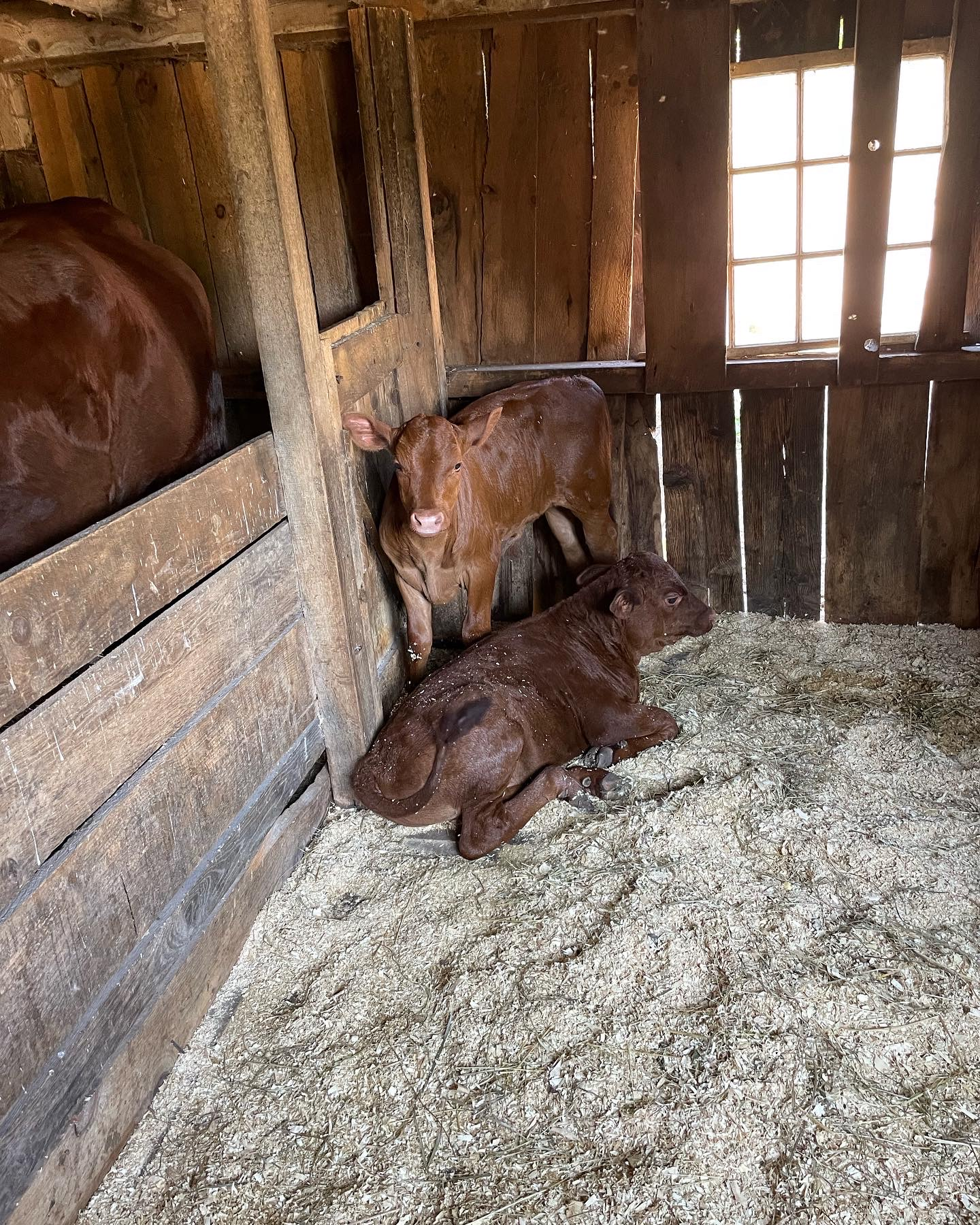

=== The Mill Neighborhood ===
Mill Neighborhood features:

- Gristmill – uses water power to turn a 3,000 lb (1,400 kg) millstone for grinding grain
- Sawmill – a working replica of an "up-and-down" sawmill powered by a reaction-type waterwheel
- Carding Mill – a water-driven facility to prepare wool for spinning

=== Collections ===
Old Sturbridge Village has several buildings devoted to displaying their assorted collections of early American antiques.

- Firearms – many displays feature firearms from colonial America through the post-Civil War era
- Glass – there are three categories of displays: blown glass, molded glass, and pressed glass
- Lighting Devices – early lighting devices from ancient oil lamps and candles to whale oil, camphene, and argand lamps
- Herb Garden – a living collection of native and heirloom varieties of ornamental plants and those used for cooking, medicine, dying cloth, and making traditional crafts

=== Scenes from interactive exhibits ===
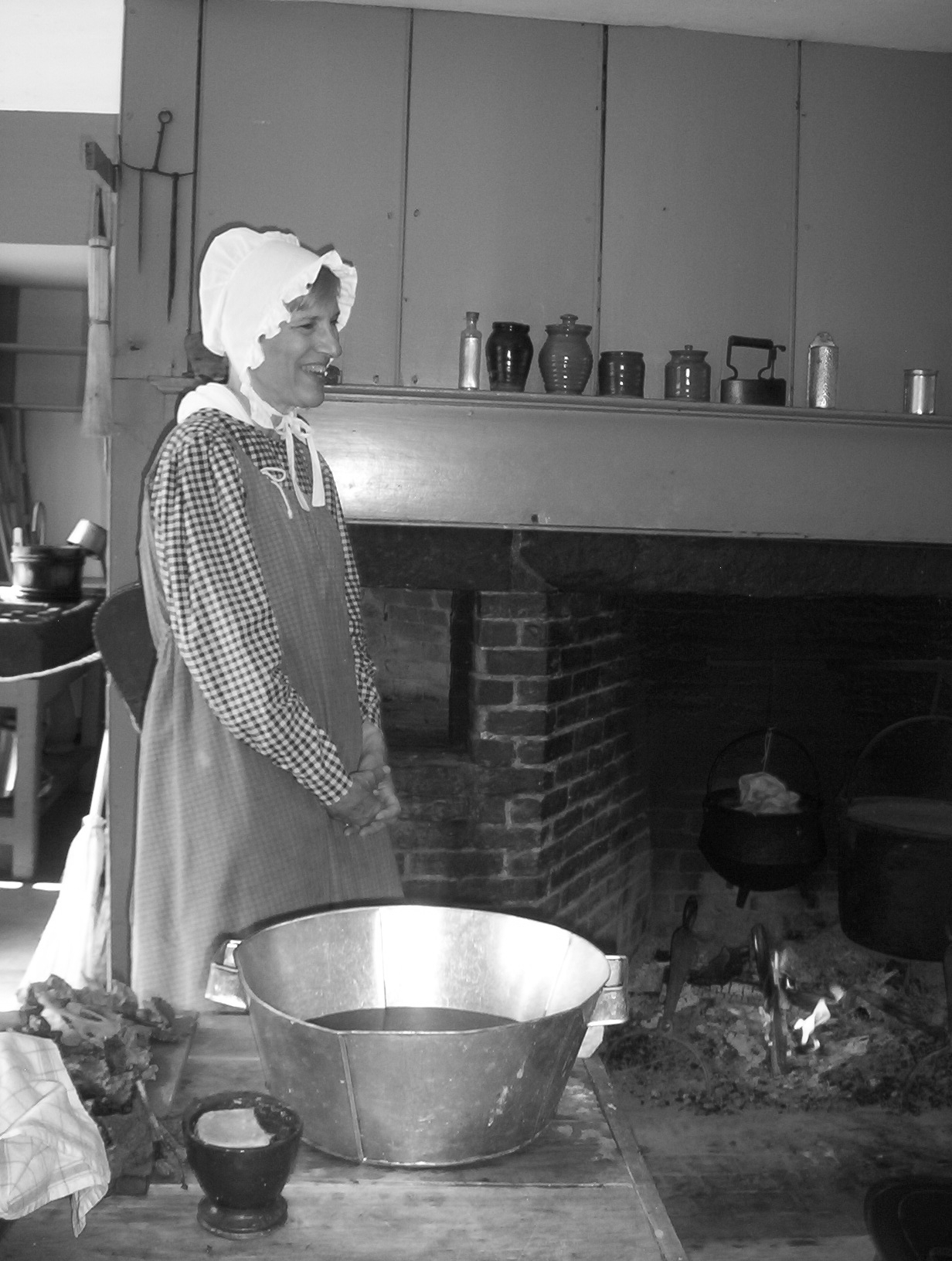
Food preparation demonstration in an early 19th-century kitchen

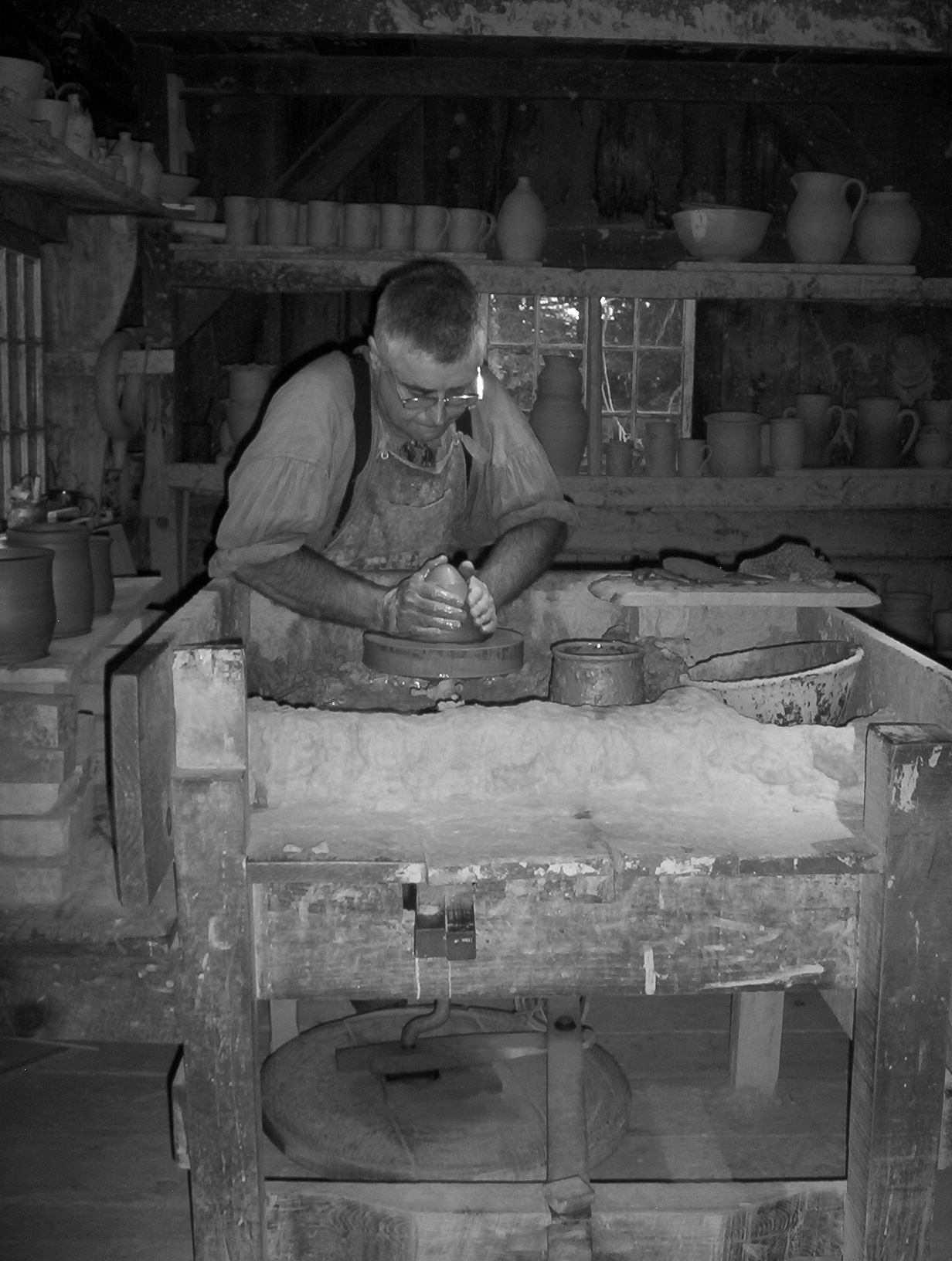
A potter produces handmade goods on an old-fashioned wheel

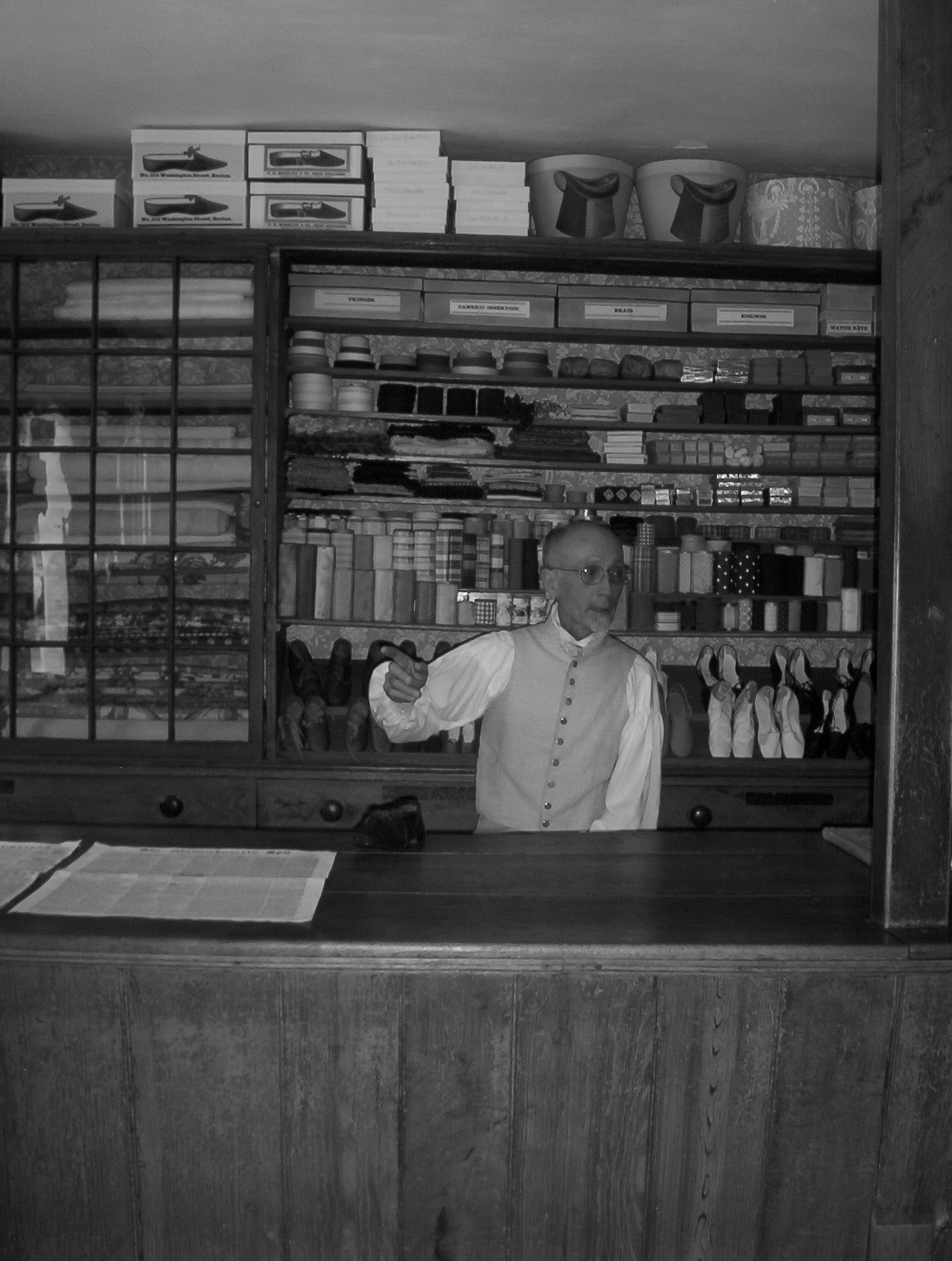
A shopkeeper displays typical early 1800s goods

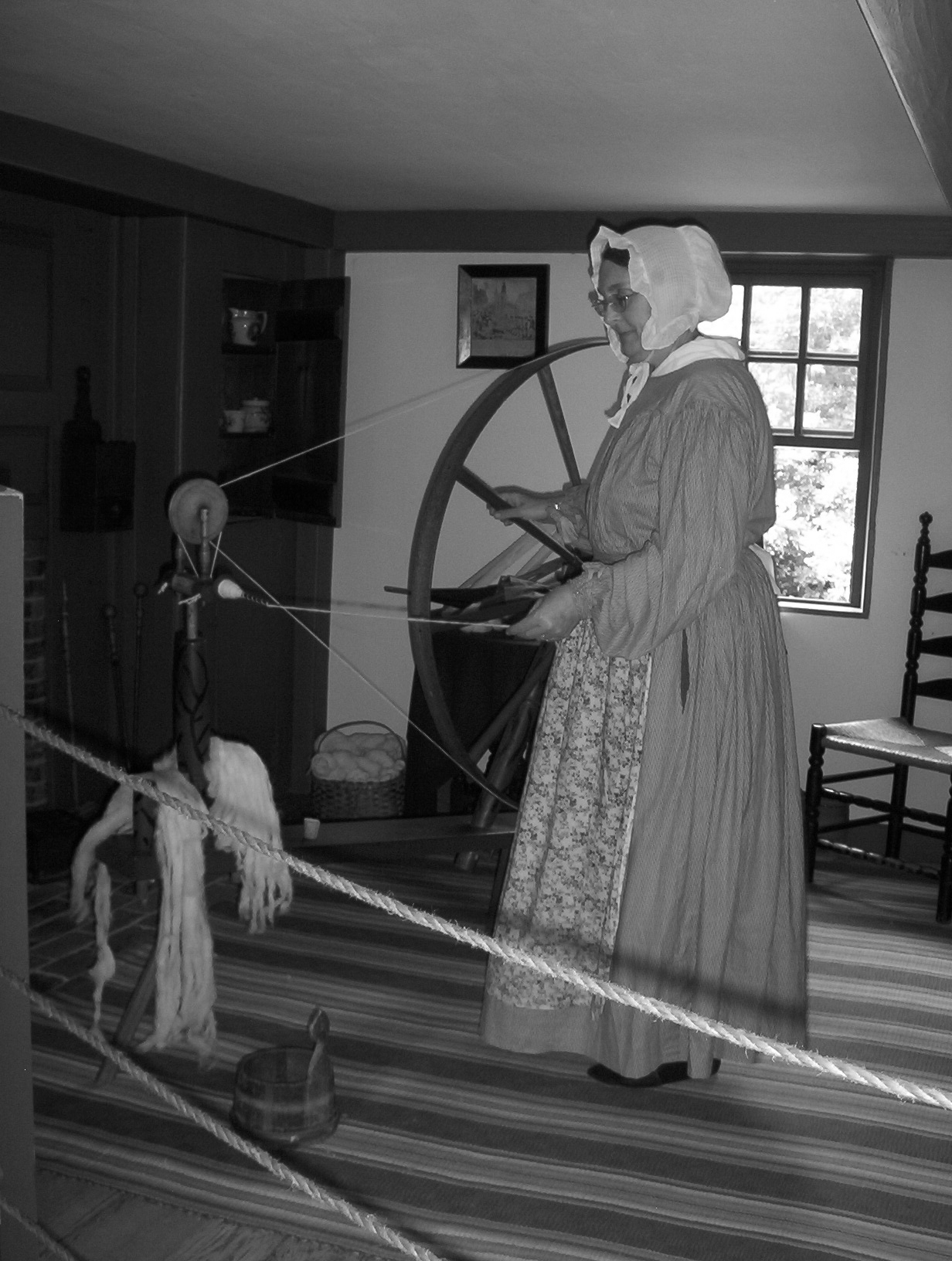
A woman demonstrates spinning wool into yarn

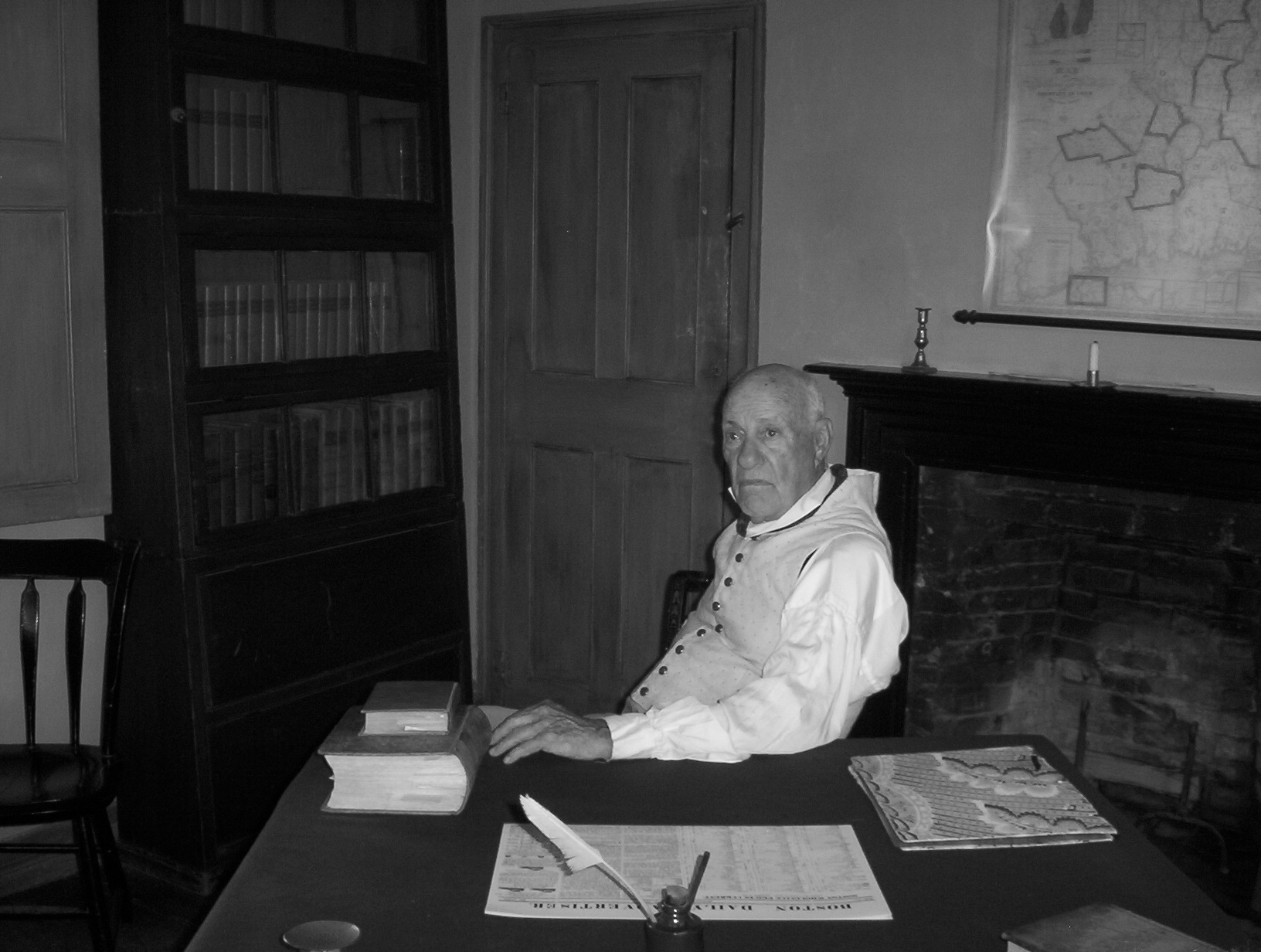
Lawyer in the pre-Civil War law office

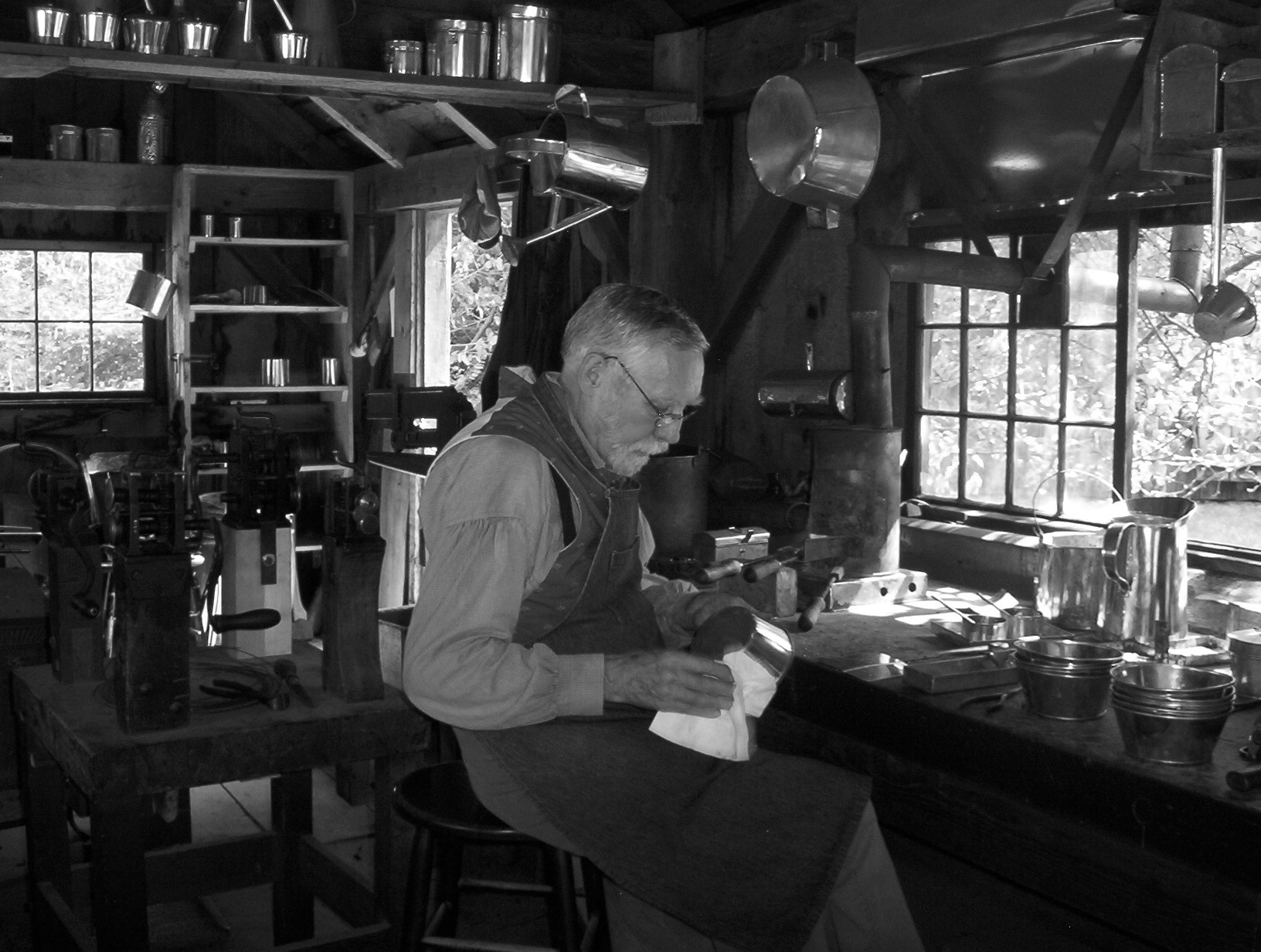
A tinsmith demonstrates how tinware was produced

== Programs ==
The Village hosts history- and seasonal-themed events such as homeschool days, kids' summer camps, Christmas by Candlelight, Fourth of July, Halloween, and Thanksgiving. Old Sturbridge Village is frequently host to a naturalization ceremony on the Fourth of July. In 2018, 152 new United States citizens were naturalized at Old Sturbridge Village.

The Village is a popular wedding location.

== Appearances in TV and film ==
Old Sturbridge Village has been used as a set in many historical movies, TV shows, and documentaries, including Hawaii (1966) starring Julie Andrews, Reading Rainbow (1984), Glory (1989), Slavery and the Making of America (2005), and ‘’Fetch! With Ruff Ruffman’’ (2009).

Old Sturbridge Village was also frequently visited by Norm Abram on The New Yankee Workshop as inspiration for creating antique furniture reproductions.

Filmmaker Ken Burns's Hampshire College undergraduate thesis was an educational film made at Old Sturbridge Village called Working in Rural New England. Burns remains a patron and supporter of the museum, and his team used it as a shooting location while filming his American Revolution miniseries. Old Sturbridge Village now awards a yearly "Ken Burns Lifetime Achievement Award" to individuals who have made a significant contribution to the preservation of history through the arts. Recipients have included Paul Giamatti, Jon Meacham, Norm Abram, Cokie Roberts, John Williams, Tom Brokaw, Sam Waterston, Doris Kearns Goodwin, and Laura Linney.

== Old Sturbridge Village-Managed Charter Schools ==
In July 2017, Old Sturbridge Village CEO Jim Donohue, who had previously founded the first charter school in Rhode Island, announced the opening of Old Sturbridge Academy Charter School, which would open in modular classrooms on the museum's premises the following fall. In 2023, the Massachusetts Board of Secondary Education approved a second charter school, Worcester Cultural Academy, in Worcester. The school was approved for a budget of $7 million per year, funded by the Student Opportunity Act; approval followed controversy after CEO Jim Donohue stated money generated from the school would bring in revenue for the museum. The Educational Association of Worcester and the Massachusetts Teachers Associations both called for a boycott of field trips to Old Sturbridge Village due to concerns that the museum was unfairly profiting off of the charter school. In April 2023, the Worcester School committee voted unanimously to approve a ban on field trips to the museum, pending investigation.

== See also ==
- Living history
- Crowd Site
- Open-air museum
