= Norm Abram =

American carpenter and television personality (born 1949)

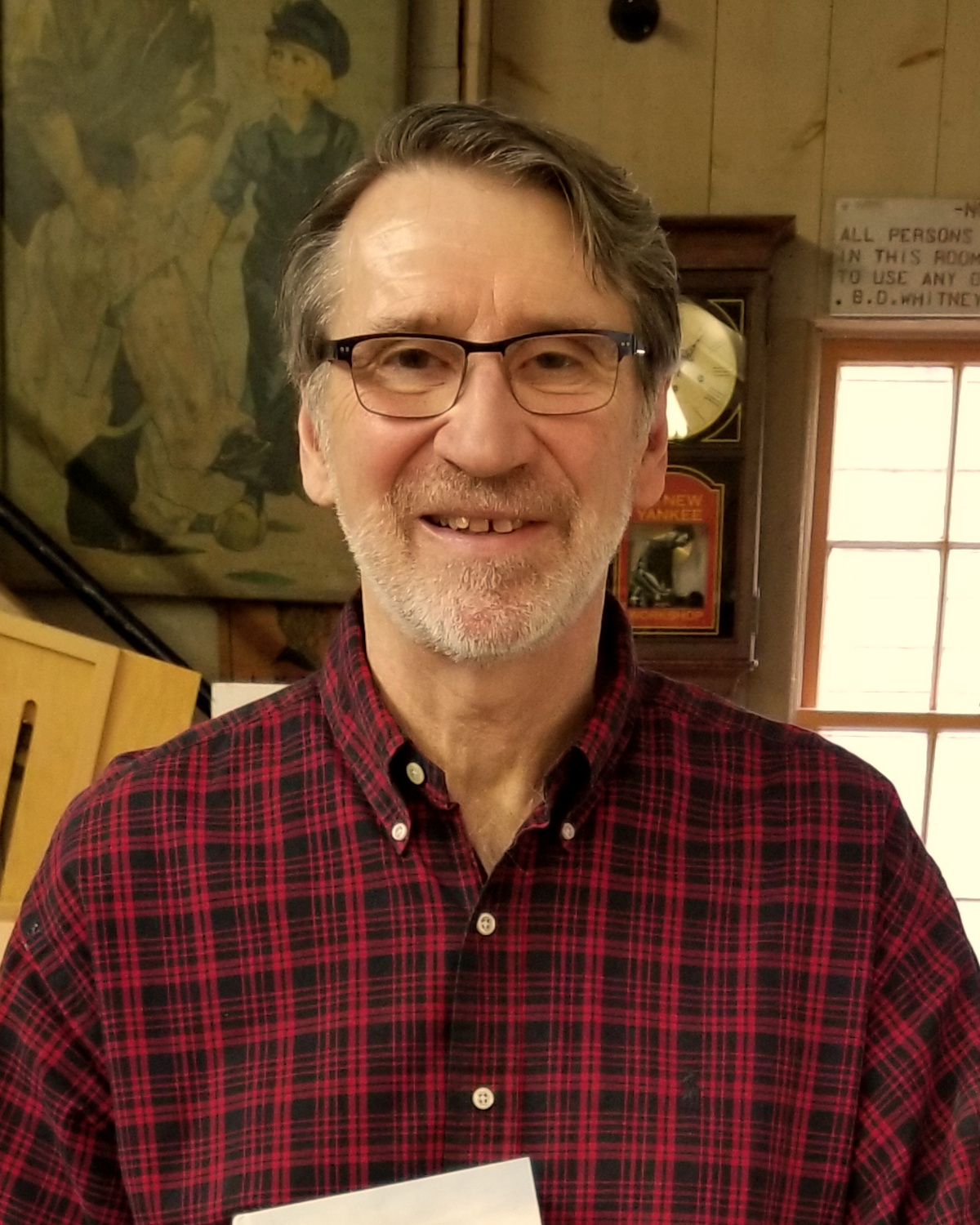
- Abram in 2019
- Born: October 3, 1949 (age 77); Woonsocket, Rhode Island, U.S.
- Occupations: Carpenter; television host; writer
- Spouses: Laura Cone (div. 1996) Elise Hauenstein (m. 1999)
- Website: www.newyankee.com

Norm Abram (born October 3, 1949) is an American carpenter, writer, and television host best known for his work on the PBS television programs This Old House and The New Yankee Workshop. He is a carpenter and has published several books and articles about the craft.

== Early life and education ==
Abram was born in Woonsocket, Rhode Island, and raised in Milford, Massachusetts, where he attended high school. His father was a carpenter, who taught his son many of his practical skills. Abram first worked on a client's site at the age of 9, helping his father install hardwood floors. He worked with his father during summer vacations in high school and college.

Abram initially studied mechanical engineering at the University of Massachusetts Amherst (UMass), where he became a brother of the Pi Lambda Phi fraternity. He found theoretical engineering courses to be uninteresting, and switched to studying business administration. He realized that he enjoyed practical hands-on work, and left UMass just short of finishing a degree.

== Career ==
=== Early career ===
After leaving college, Abram worked for three years for a multimillion-dollar New England–based construction firm, and was rapidly promoted to a position as a site supervisor. In 1976, Abram went into business for himself, founding the general contracting firm Integrated Structures Inc. and operating it until 1989. His first major independent project was building a general store on Nantucket.

=== This Old House ===
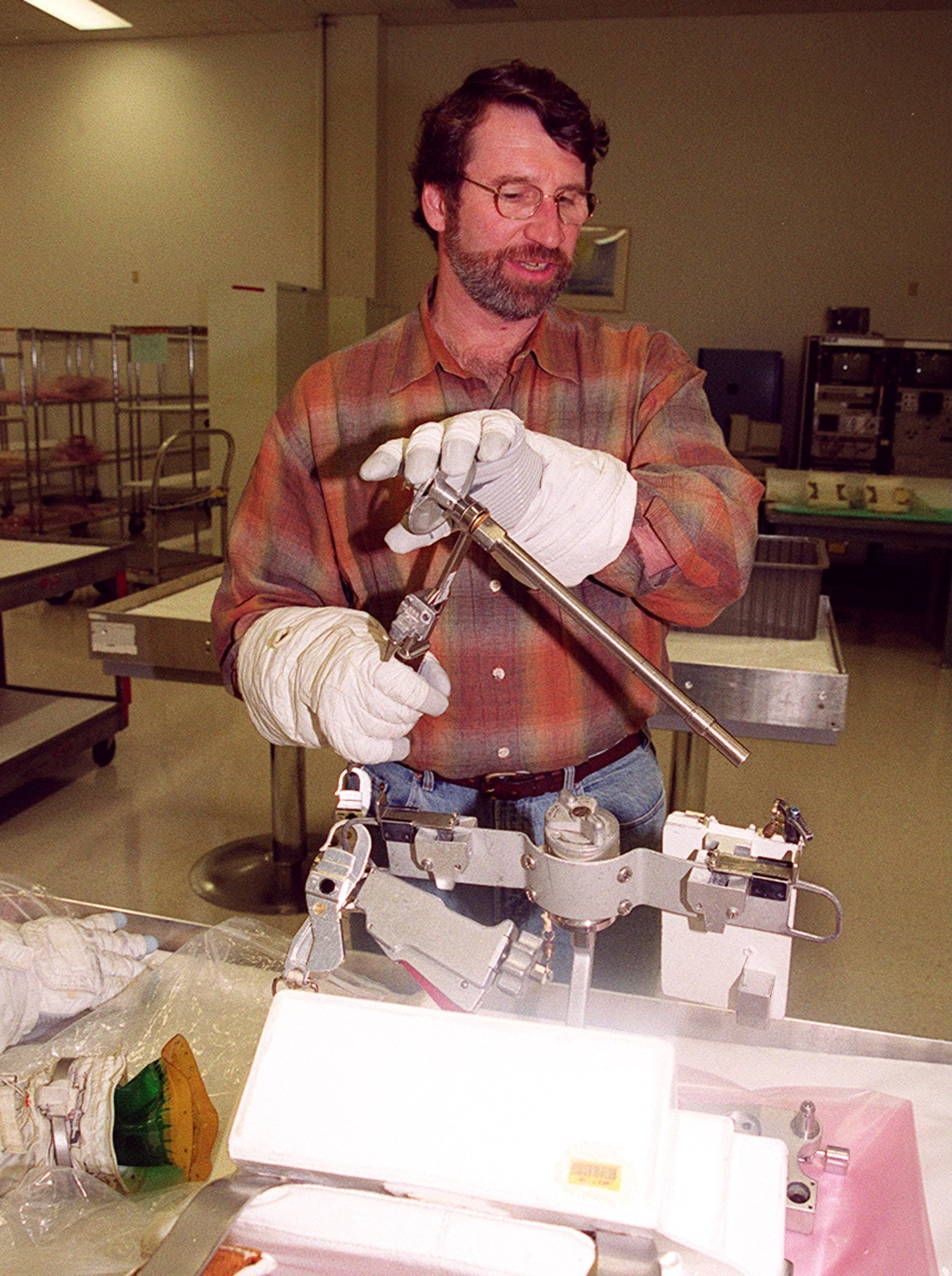
Norm Abram recording an episode of This Old House at Kennedy Space Center, 2000

In 1979, Abram took a construction job building a small barn/garage/toolshed/workshop in the backyard of television producer Russell Morash, who had produced Julia Child's popular cooking program The French Chef for WGBH-TV in Boston. Impressed by Abram's small scrap pile and efficient work habits, Morash invited Abram to help with the renovation of a rundown Victorian house in Dorchester. A WGBH camera crew recorded the process for the first This Old House project, hosted by Bob Vila. Morash then asked Abram to appear as a regular on This Old House, and Abram became a fixture on the show.

On May 19, 2022, it was announced that after 43 years, Abram would retire from the show. A one-hour special titled The House that Norm Built aired online and on PBS stations on October 3, 2022, surveying his career with the program.

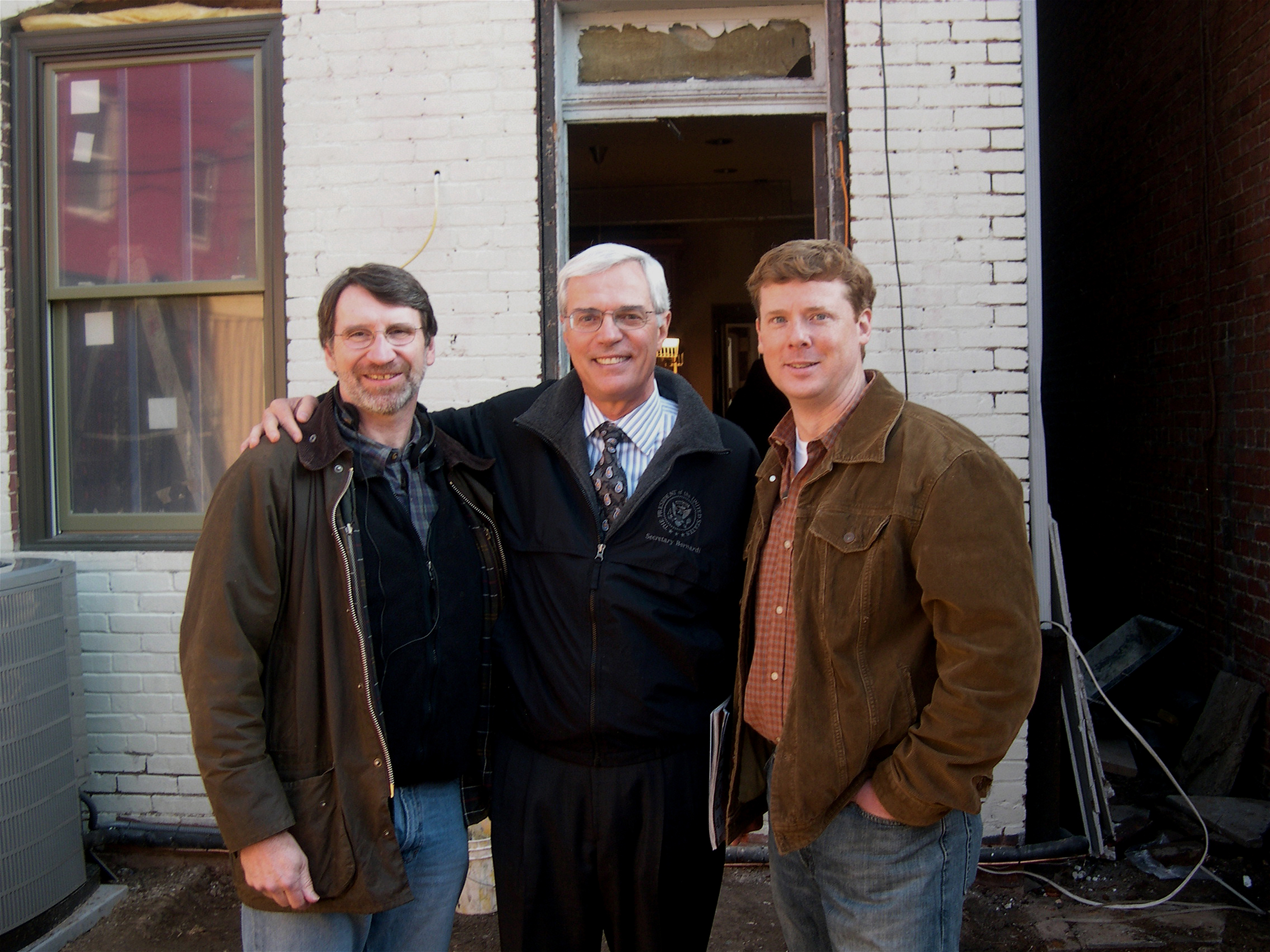
Norm Abram (left), with HUD Deputy Secretary Roy Bernardi (center), and This Old House host Kevin O'Connor (right), at a renovation site in 2006

=== The New Yankee Workshop ===
In 1988, Morash planned to launch a spinoff of This Old House called The New Yankee Workshop, featuring Abram. They needed a convenient place to videotape, and used the shop in the small building that Abram built in 1979 in Morash's backyard. The shop's layout and equipment were expanded and adapted to match Abram's preferences, in a space measuring 36 by 26 feet (11.0 by 7.9 m). The New Yankee Workshop was first aired in 1989 with Abram as the host. The program showcased furniture or other projects and emphasized classic, elegant designs, made using a combination of simple handtools and newer power tools and equipment. The show aired for 21 seasons on PBS, then was suspended indefinitely as Abram decided to focus on other projects.

In 2023, shortly after Abram's official retirement from This Old House, he and Russell Morash decided to unveil a redesign of the website where project plans were still available, and The New Yankee Workshop YouTube channel where all of the show's episodes are available to view for free for future generations of woodworkers.

=== Other projects ===
Abram is on the board of trustees of Old Sturbridge Village in Sturbridge, Massachusetts. He delivered the 2001 commencement speech at the North Bennet Street School in Boston, which is renowned for its commitment to teaching craftsmanship. He has also contributed to efforts to train younger students in the building trades, such as the Generation NEXT apprenticeship program.

Abram also voiced himself in the Freakazoid! episode "Normadeus", where he was kidnapped by the villainous Lobe and forced to make a special wooden weapon for him. He also appeared on Between the Lions and twice on Where in the World is Carmen Sandiego?; and starred in a series of Foot Locker commercials titled "House of Hoops". Abram appeared on Fetch! With Ruff Ruffman in the episode "This Old... Lemonade Stand". He also appeared in the 2010 Ace of Cakes episode "Indy, Ice and Improv".

== Presentation style ==
Abram is well known for his soft spoken, calm manner of explaining precise, efficient woodworking techniques. He is usually seen wearing a plaid shirt, a style that has become his trademark. He begins his shows with a reminder about personal safety, specifically highlighting the importance of wearing safety glasses.

Abram emphasizes the importance of focusing attention when performing dangerous operations, such as cutting with a power saw. He avoids working when rushed, tired, distracted, or after drinking even small amounts of alcohol. He advises against misusing tools or failing to sharpen them properly. He is not afraid to talk to himself in the shop, reviewing carefully the next steps before he undertakes them.

== Awards and recognition ==
The American Academy of Ophthalmology awarded Abram its EyeSmart Distinguished Service Award on April 23, 2009. The award was presented for "his steadfast commitment to safety and the prevention of eye injuries".

In 2018, Abram was selected for the Ken Burns Lifetime Achievement Award by the filmmaker who, with Old Sturbridge Village, gives the award to "individual[s] who [have] made a significant impact on the arts through a project that is relevant to the history Old Sturbridge Village works to preserve".

In 2022, the National Academy of Television Arts & Sciences honored Abram along with This Old House with the Lifetime Achievement Award at the 49th Daytime Emmy Awards.

== Personal life ==
Norm Abram has lived with his wife, Elise (a potter), in a custom modified classic two story Colonial, timber framed home that he built in Carlisle, Massachusetts, with the assistance of his father and other professionals. He wrote his book Norm Abram's New House (1995) based on his experiences planning and building the house.

More recently, he bought a new old house in Rhode Island near the coast, where he plans to build a new woodworking shop, and he is also interested in learning shipbuilding.

His fondness for plaid shirts is well-known and at times parodied, a prime example being the character Al Borland from Home Improvement, portrayed by Richard Karn.

Abram and his wife enjoy cooking and entertaining, visiting museums and art galleries, boating, kayaking, and fishing.

Abram was previously married to Laura Cone (divorced in 1996), with whom he has a daughter, Lindsey.

== Books and other publications ==
Norm Abram has authored eight books about carpentry:

- Abram, Norm; Snyder, Tim (1989). The New Yankee Workshop. Little, Brown. ISBN 9780316004534.
- Abram, Norm; Snyder, Tim (1990). Classics From The New Yankee Workshop. Little, Brown. ISBN 9780316004565.
- Abram, Norm; Sloan, David (1992). Mostly Shaker From The New Yankee Workshop. Little, Brown. ISBN 9780316004732.
- Abram, Norm; Walker, Roland (1994). The New Yankee Workshop: Outdoor Projects. Little, Brown. ISBN 9780316004855.
- Abram, Norm (1995). Norm Abram's New House. Little Brown. ISBN 9780316004107.
- Abram, Norm (1996). Measure Twice, Cut Once. ISBN 9780316004947.
- Abram, Norm (1998). The New Yankee Workshop Kids' Stuff. Little, Brown. ISBN 9780316004930.
- Abram, Norm (2001). Ask Norm. Time Home Entertainment, Incorporated. ISBN 9781929049356.

He has also contributed to Complete Remodeling. This Old House Books. 2004. ISBN 9780376003003. and Complete Landscaping. Oxmoor House. January 2004. ISBN 9780376003027., both published in 2004 by This Old House Books in conjunction with Sunset Books. Abram also serves on the editorial board of This Old House magazine, published by This Old House Ventures, Inc., also authoring the popular column, "Norm's Notebook".
