= Russell Morash =

American television director and producer (1936–2024)

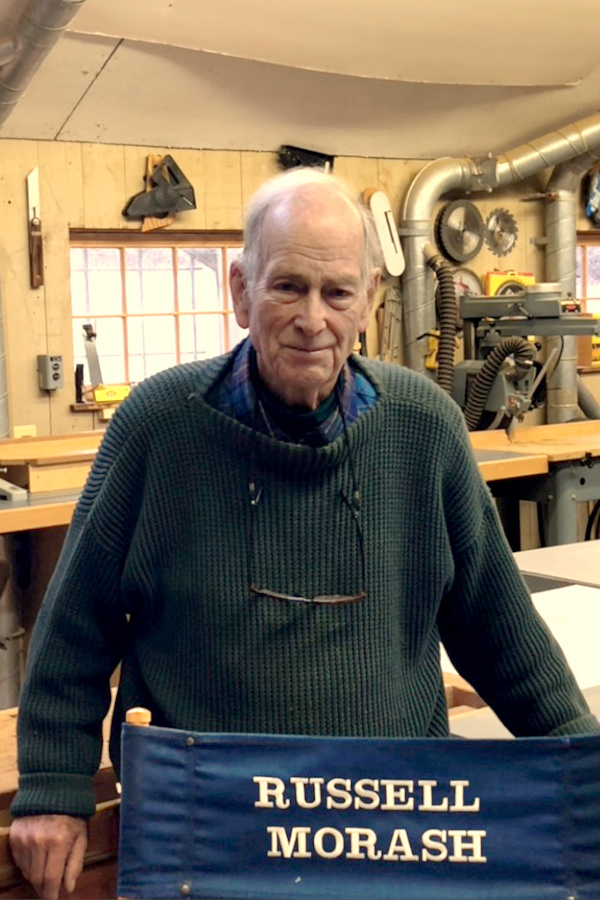
- Morash in 2023
- Born: February 11, 1936; Belmont, Massachusetts, U.S.
- Died: June 19, 2024 (aged 88); Concord, Massachusetts, U.S.
- Education: Boston University
- Occupations: Public Television Producer; Director
- Spouse: Marian Morash (m. 1958)
- Website: www.newyankee.com

Russell Morash (February 11, 1936 – June 19, 2024) was an American public television producer and director. Morash's many educational television programs including The French Chef, The Victory Garden, This Old House, and The New Yankee Workshop, were produced through WGBH and aired on PBS.

His work earned fourteen Emmy Awards, and he was the 2014 recipient of the Lifetime Achievement Award at the Daytime Emmy awards.

== Early life ==
Russell Fredrick Morash, Jr. was born on February 11, 1936, in Belmont, Massachusetts. He grew up in Lexington along with his twin brother David and younger sister Ruth. Morash's father, Russell F. Morash, Sr. was a carpenter and builder while his mother, Naomi Lingley Morash, a secretary. In 1957, Morash graduated from the Boston University College of Fine Arts.

== Career ==
Morash started his edutainment career as a cameraman for Boston public-television station WGBH-TV. In 1961, as a cameraman, Morash met Julia Child when she appeared on a WGBH program called I've Been Reading, while promoting her cookbook Mastering the Art of French Cooking. Viewers flooded the station with calls and letters asking to see more. The French Chef premiered on WGBH in 1962 and then was distributed nationally by American Public Television. Morash began directing The French Chef in 1963. They worked together on other cooking shows for more than thirty years.

Morash's theater-inspired directorial style and the technology of the day, required that the staff and host would shoot each episode in one take. It established an in-the-moment template–also known as 'guerrilla television'–for a new kind of public television show that Morash took with him to launch other series, such as This Old House and The Victory Garden. Russ' aesthetic was minimal, making use of the elements available on location, the audio diegetic, with one camera that would move with the cast to focus on the unscripted action. Geneva Collins wrote in Current that "His visual signature is the long unbroken take with the hand-held camera, with scenes lasting four, six even eight minutes without a cut." Morash himself had stated that he emulated the organic behavior of the human eye rather than use abstract "conventional television techniques," the former which gave the viewer the realist perception that they were in the scene of the action themselves.

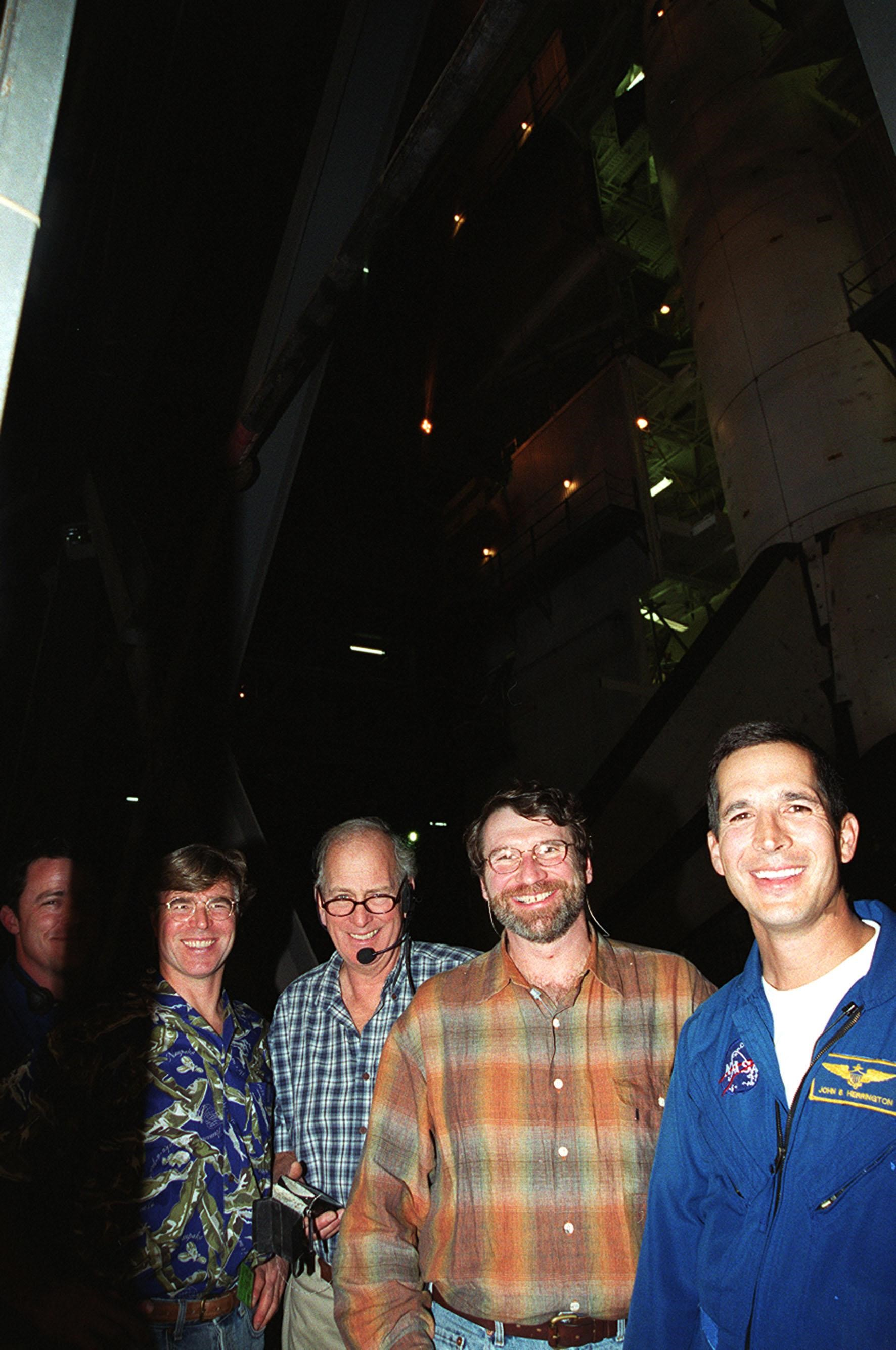
Steve Thomas (Second from Left), Russell Morash, Norm Abram, and NASA Astronaut John Herrington on a visit to the Kennedy Space Center for This Old House, 2000

This Old House host Steve Thomas said of Morash, "He was a very demanding boss, but was true to the craft" which lead to the show's success and popularity.

The Victory Garden and This Old House spinoff series The New Yankee Workshop were filmed in Morash's own backyard in Massachusetts.

== Filmography ==
- 1955 MIT Science Reporter – Director, producer
- 1958 Ruth Ann's Camp – Producer
- 1962–1966 The French Chef – Director, producer
- 1966 USA: Arts and the University – Director
- 1968 James Brown at the Boston Garden – Producer
- 1971 Louis Lyons on Calvin Coolidge – Director, producer
- 1974–2002 The Victory Garden – Director, producer, creator
- 1975 Roaring Through the Twenties – Director
- 1978 Julia Child and Company – Producer
- 1979–2004 This Old House – Director, producer, creator
- 1983–1984 Dinner at Julia's – Producer
- 1985 Julia Child: The Way to Cook – Director, producer
- 1989–2009 The New Yankee Workshop – Director, producer, creator
- 2001–2004 Ask This Old House – Director, producer, creator
- 2004 Find! – Director, producer

== Personal life ==
Morash's wife was Marian Morash, a James Beard Award-winning chef who also appeared on Julia Child's cooking show, appeared on The Victory Garden and edited The Victory Garden Cookbook. He and Marian had two daughters and five grandchildren.

Russell died on June 19, 2024 at the age of 88. In its announcement of his death, WGBH eulogized him as the founding "commanding father".

== Recognition ==
Morash's work earned 14 Emmy awards, including 11 for Outstanding Director of a Service Show, and in 2014 the Daytime Emmys Lifetime Achievement award from the National Academy of Television Arts and Sciences. He was inducted into the Massachusetts Broadcasters' Hall of Fame in 2018.

He was a fellow of the National Association of Garden Writers and the 2005 recipient of the George Robert White Medal of the Massachusetts Horticultural Society.

== Portrayals ==
Fran Kranz plays Morash in the 2022 HBO Max series Julia with Sarah Lancashire.

Awards
Preceded by Monty Hall; Bob Stewart	Recipient of the Lifetime Achievement Award at the Daytime Emmy Awards; 2014	Succeeded by Betty White
