= Marian Morash =

American chef

Marian Morash is an American cookbook author, chef, restaurateur and television presenter.

== Education ==
Morash graduated from Boston University's College of Fine Arts, where she studied acting, in 1959.

== Career ==
Morash first began cooking when her husband, Russell Morash, was producing The French Chef and would bring home partially-cooked dishes used as swap-outs on the show with instructions from Julia Child, the show's host, on how to finish the dishes.

In 1975 Morash opened the Straight Wharf restaurant in Nantucket, Massachusetts.

In 1975 Morash helped launch WGBH gardening show Crocket's Victory Garden, hosted by James Underwood Crockett; she served as the show's on-air chef, demonstrating how to use the vegetables that Crockett grew. The show was produced by her husband. After Crockett's death in 1979, Morash took over hosting and the show was retitled The Victory Garden and eventually Victory Garden's Edible Feast; the show ended in 2015.

Morash's The Victory Garden Cookbook was published in 1982 by Knopf. The book became a bestseller. Publishers Weekly, writing in their review of her subsequent The Victory Garden Fish and Vegetable Cookbook, said the first book had "strong success." UPI called it "a vegetable encyclopedia for cooks who garden and gardeners who cook".

== Recognition ==
In 1984 Morash won a James Beard Who's Who of Food and Beverage in America.

== Personal life ==
Morash and her husband, Russell Morash, had two daughters.
