= The New Yankee Workshop =

- Created by: Russell Morash
- Presented by: Norm Abram
- Country of origin: United States
- Original language: English
- No. of seasons: 21
- No. of episodes: 284

Production
- Running time: 30 minutes
- Production companies: WGBH-TV; Morash Associates

Original release
- Network: PBS
- Release: January 7, 1989 – October 16, 2009

The New Yankee Workshop is an American half-hour woodworking television series produced by WGBH Boston, which aired on PBS. Created in 1989 by Russell Morash, the program was hosted by Norm Abram, a regular fixture on Morash's television series This Old House.

== Overview ==
The New Yankee Workshop featured the construction of woodworking projects, including workshop accessories, architectural details and furniture projects ranging from simple pieces to complex, high-quality reproductions of antique classic furniture. In the course of 21 seasons, approximately 235 projects were produced. In addition to furniture and cabinets, the show also focused on outdoor projects such as the building of a gazebo, shed, greenhouse, sailing boat, flag pole, mail box, cupola, and fences. At the start of many episodes, Norm Abram travels to historic landmarks or notable locations that relate to the subject project.

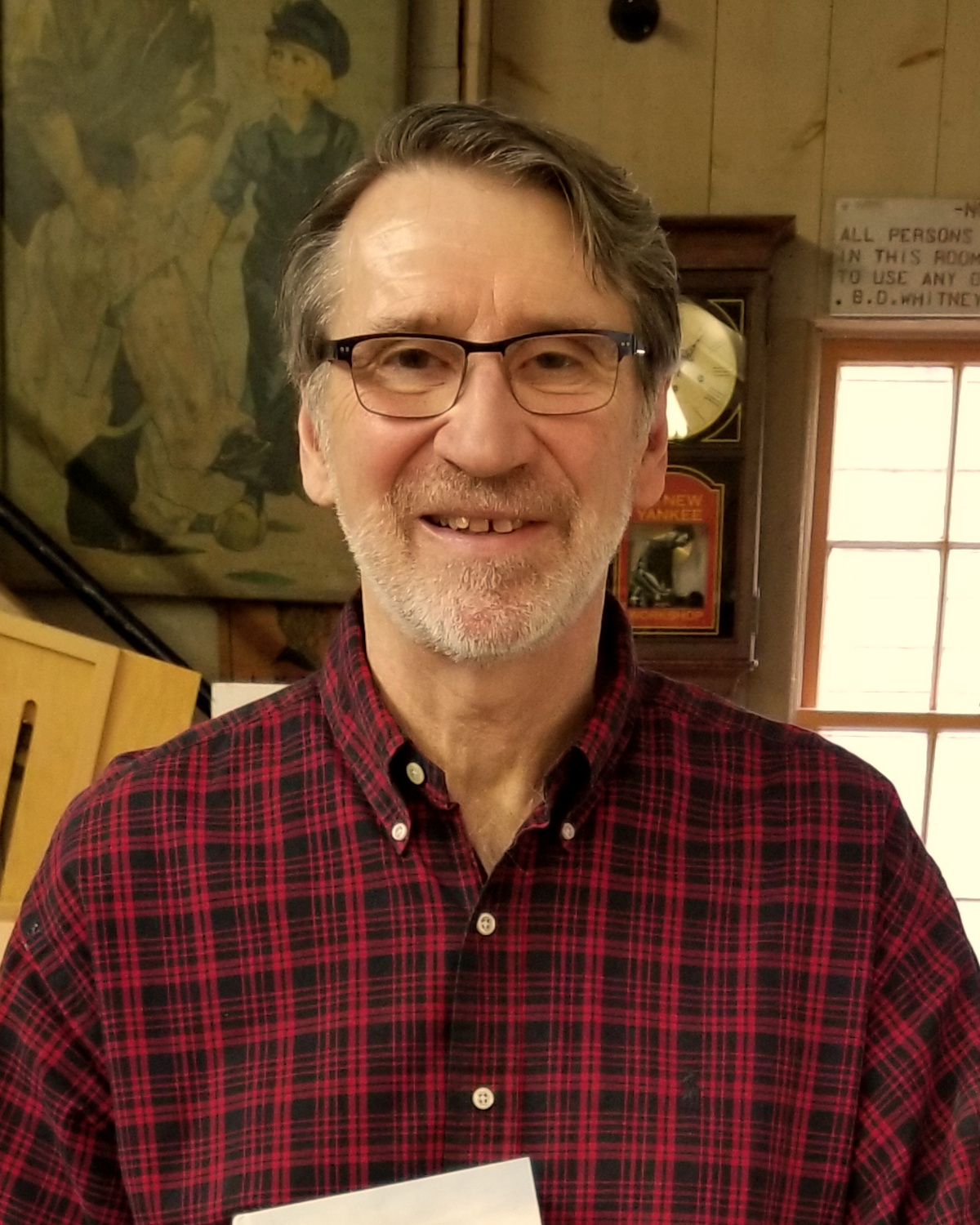
Norm Abram in the New Yankee Workshop, 2019

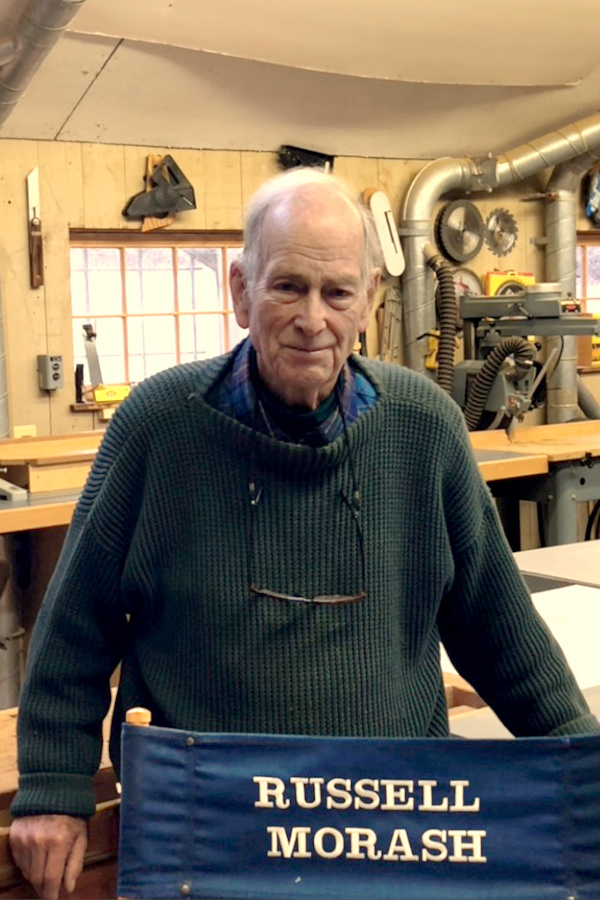
Russell Morash, producer and director, in the New Yankee Workshop, 2023

== Theme song ==
The New Yankee Workshop theme song consists of a fast-paced guitar tune with a harmonica sound. It is composed by Peter Bell and David Mash of Musitech Productions.

== Set design ==
The shop where the show was produced is owned by Morash and is located on his property even though the viewer was given the impression that it was in Abram's backyard.

The shop is 936 square feet (87.0 m^{2}) in size. The famous sliding barn door faces west. Along the west wall is the "back bench" and drill press. Along the south wall is the miter bench and storage unit, radial arm saw, and (not seen in episodes) a computer, a TV, and a small office area. The east wall of the shop has a staircase leading to a loft area, jig storage, horizontal edge sander, and dust collector. The north wall houses sheet goods, router table, bar clamps, wide belt sander, planer, jointer, band saw, and various mobile tools. The center area of the shop consists of the table saw and associated outfeed tables as well as a large assembly table. In the northeast section of the building is a separate finishing room.

== Cancellation ==
On October 16, 2009, WGBH Boston announced that no further episodes of New Yankee Workshop would be produced. In remarking on the end of the show, Abram stated, "We've had a great run, built challenging projects, met wonderful woodworkers and received loyal support from millions of viewers." Abram later said that the entire duration of the show was fully funded through underwriting and could have kept going, but he decided he had accomplished everything he wanted to do and wanted to spend more time with his family.

Until September 5, 2022, episodes of The New Yankee Workshop were available to stream on NewYankee.com and through the This Old House Insider subscription service. Project plan PDFs were also available with the Insider subscription. It was announced that the license agreement between Morash Assoc., Inc. WGBH Educational Foundation, Linnor, Inc. and This Old House Ventures, LLC (parent company Roku, Inc.) had expired and episodes would no longer be available through This Old House.

On January 13, 2023, the New Yankee Workshop YouTube channel posted a video of Russell Morash announcing the availability of episodes on YouTube. After giving a tour of the New Yankee Workshop Morash ended the video by stating, "We are thrilled to know that YouTube is now showing The New Yankee episodes to a whole new generation of people who may have somehow missed out the first time it was around, and now they're available anytime you tune to YouTube and want to watch a feast of woodworking. It's all there and it's all for you to enjoy and I certainly hope you do."

== Award nominations ==
- Daytime Emmy Award for Outstanding Service Show, Russell Morash (1997, 1998, 2000)
- Daytime Emmy Award for Single Camera Editing, Gary Stephenson (1999)

== Episodes ==
Over the course of its 21 seasons, at least 235 projects were built on New Yankee Workshop.

=== Season 1 (1989) ===
- The closing credits for the first eight seasons of The New Yankee Workshop consisted of an exterior shot of the workshop with a sign in it, as we see Norm Abram closing the workshop door, and gets ready to go home and have dinner with his family.
- On early episodes of this season, with the workshop door already opened, a dog is visible running away while Norm puts his tools away. For the rest of the entire season, after Norm puts his tools away, he moves the table, and the corner cupboard out of the way, and closes the workshop door.

No. overall	No. in season	Title	Original release date	Prod. code	Project Page
1	1	"Medicine Cabinet"	January 7, 1989	101	https://www.newyankee.com/product/medicine-cabinet/
2	2	"Workbench"	January 14, 1989	102	https://www.newyankee.com/product/workbench/
3	3	"Drop Leaf Table"	January 21, 1989	103	https://www.newyankee.com/product/drop-leaf-table/
4	4	"Blanket Chest"	January 28, 1989	104	https://www.newyankee.com/product/blanket-chest/
5	5	"Bedside Table"	February 4, 1989	105	https://www.newyankee.com/product/bedside-table/
6	6	"Oak Bathroom Vanity"	February 11, 1989	106	https://www.newyankee.com/product/oak-bathroom-vanity/
7	7	"Trestle Table"	February 18, 1989	107	https://www.newyankee.com/product/trestle-table/
8	8	"Bookcase"	February 25, 1989	108	https://www.newyankee.com/product/bookcase/
9	9	"Chest of Drawers"	March 4, 1989	109	https://www.newyankee.com/product/chest-of-drawers/
10	10	"Candle Stand"	March 11, 1989	110	https://www.newyankee.com/product/candle-stand/
11	11	"Hutch"	March 18, 1989	111	https://www.newyankee.com/product/hutch/
12	12	"Slant Top Writing Desk"	March 25, 1989	112	https://www.newyankee.com/product/slant-top-writing-desk/
13	13	"Corner Cupboard"	April 1, 1989	113	https://www.newyankee.com/product/corner-cupboard/

=== Season 2 (1990) ===
No. overall	No. in season	Title	Original release date	Prod. code	Project Page
14	1	"Rocking Horse"	January 6, 1990	201	https://www.newyankee.com/product/rocking-horse/
15	2	"Adirondack Chair"	January 13, 1990	202	https://www.thisoldhouse.com/watch/adirondack-trio-new-yankee-workshop
16	3	"Butler's Table"	January 20, 1990	203	https://www.newyankee.com/product/butlers-table/
17	4	"Kitchen Dresser"	January 27, 1990	204	https://www.newyankee.com/product/kitchen-dresser/
18	5	"Hearthside Settle"	February 3, 1990	205	https://www.newyankee.com/product/hearthside-settle/
19	6	"Pencil-Post Bed"	February 10, 1990	206	https://www.newyankee.com/product/pencil-post-bed/
20	7	"Chair Table"	February 17, 1990	207	https://www.newyankee.com/product/chair-table/
21	8	"Kitchen Worktable"	February 24, 1990	208	https://www.newyankee.com/product/kitchen-worktable/
22	9	"Mission Style Sofa"	March 3, 1990	209	https://www.newyankee.com/product/mission-style-sofa/
23	10	"Chippendale Mirror"	March 10, 1990	210	https://www.newyankee.com/product/chippendale-mirror/
24	11	"Chest on Chest"	March 17, 1990	211	https://www.newyankee.com/product/chest-on-chest/
25	12	"English Garden Bench"	March 24, 1990	212	https://www.newyankee.com/product/english-garden-bench/
26	13	"Armoire (Entertainment Center)"	March 31, 1990	213	https://www.newyankee.com/product/armoire-entertainment-center/

=== Season 3 (1991) ===
No. overall	No. in season	Title	Original release date	Prod. code	Project Page
27	1	"Shaker Step Stools"	January 5, 1991	301	https://www.newyankee.com/product/shaker-step-stools/
28	2	"Picnic Table and Saw Horses"	January 12, 1991	302	https://www.newyankee.com/product/picnic-table-and-saw-horses/
29	3	"Shaker Two Drawer Blanket Chest"	January 19, 1991	303	https://www.newyankee.com/product/shaker-two-drawer-blanket-chest/
30	4	"Shaker Washstand"	January 26, 1991	304	https://www.newyankee.com/product/shaker-washstand/
31	5	"Shaker Wall Clock"	February 2, 1991	305	https://www.newyankee.com/product/shaker-wall-clock/
32	6	"Sandbox"	February 9, 1991	306	https://www.newyankee.com/product/sandbox/
33	7	"Harvest Table"	February 16, 1991	307	https://www.newyankee.com/product/harvest-table/
34	8	"Shaker Woodbox"	February 23, 1991	308	https://www.newyankee.com/product/shaker-woodbox/
35	9	"Library Table"	March 2, 1991	309	https://www.newyankee.com/product/library-table/
36	10	"Garden Swing"	March 9, 1991	310	https://www.newyankee.com/product/garden-swing/
37	11	"Cricket Table"	March 16, 1991	311	https://www.newyankee.com/product/cricket-table/
38	12	"Pie Safe with Punched Tin Front"	March 23, 1991	312	https://www.newyankee.com/product/pie-safe-with-punched-tin-front/
39	13	"Standing Mirror"	March 30, 1991	313	https://www.newyankee.com/product/standing-mirror/

=== Season 4 (1992) ===
No. overall	No. in season	Title	Original release date	Prod. code	Project Page
40	1	"Rolling Shop Cabinet"	January 4, 1992	401	https://www.newyankee.com/product/rolling-shop-cabinet/
41	2	"Outdoor Lidded Bench"	January 11, 1992	402	https://www.newyankee.com/product/outdoor-lidded-bench/
42	3	"Child's Wagon"	January 18, 1992	403	https://www.newyankee.com/product/childs-wagon/
43	4	"Coffee Table"	January 25, 1992	404	https://www.newyankee.com/product/coffee-table/
44	5	"Gardener's Work Bench"	February 1, 1992	405	https://www.newyankee.com/product/gardeners-work-bench/
45	6	"Shaker Tall Chest"	February 8, 1992	406	https://www.newyankee.com/product/shaker-tall-chest/
46	7	"Colonial Fences"	February 15, 1992	407	https://www.newyankee.com/product/colonial-fences/
47	8	"Console Table"	February 22, 1992	408	https://www.newyankee.com/product/console-table/
48	9	"Wheel Barrow"	February 29, 1992	409	https://www.newyankee.com/product/wheel-barrow/
49	10	"Umbrella Stand"	March 7, 1992	410	https://www.newyankee.com/product/umbrella-stand/
50	11	"Turned Post Bed"	March 14, 1992	411	https://www.newyankee.com/product/turned-post-bed/
51	12	"Dove Cote"	March 21, 1992	412	https://www.newyankee.com/product/dove-cote/
52	13	"Ladderback Chair"	March 28, 1992	413	https://www.newyankee.com/product/ladder-back-chair/

=== Season 5 (1993) ===
No. overall	No. in season	Title	Original release date	Prod. code	Project Page
53	1	"Victorian Kitchen Table"	January 2, 1993	501	https://www.newyankee.com/product/victorian-kitchen-table/
54	2	"Plant Stand"	January 9, 1993	502	https://www.newyankee.com/product/plant-stand/
55	3	"Delft Rack"	January 16, 1993	503	https://www.newyankee.com/product/delft-rack/
56	4	"Oak Coffee Table"	January 23, 1993	504	https://www.newyankee.com/product/oak-coffee-table/
57	5	"Outdoor Planters"	January 30, 1993	505	https://www.newyankee.com/product/outdoor-planters/
58	6	"Pantry Table"	February 6, 1993	506	https://www.newyankee.com/product/pantry-table/
59	7	"Sideboard"	February 13, 1993	507	https://www.newyankee.com/product/sideboard/
60	8	"Hanging Corner Cupboard"	February 20, 1993	508	https://www.newyankee.com/product/hanging-corner-cupboard/
61	9	"Pine Cupboard"	February 27, 1993	509	https://www.newyankee.com/product/pine-cupboard/
62	10	"Butcher Block"	March 6, 1993	510	https://www.newyankee.com/product/butcher-block/
63	11	"Redwood Arbor"	March 13, 1993	511	https://www.newyankee.com/product/redwood-arbor/
64	12	"Secretary Desk"	March 20, 1993	512	https://www.newyankee.com/product/secretary-desk/
65	13	"Tall Pine Clock"	March 27, 1993	513	https://www.newyankee.com/product/tall-pine-clock/

=== Season 6 (1994) ===
- This was the last season to use the News Plantin credits font, which had been used since Season 1.

No. overall	No. in season	Title	Original release date	Prod. code	Project Page
66	1	"Easel"	January 1, 1994	601	https://www.newyankee.com/product/easel/
67	2	"Doll House"	January 8, 1994	602	https://www.newyankee.com/product/doll-house/
68	3	"Toy Chest"	January 15, 1994	603	https://www.newyankee.com/product/toy-chest/
69	4	"Cradle"	January 22, 1994	604	https://www.newyankee.com/product/cradle/
70	5	"Trundle Bed"	January 29, 1994	605	https://www.newyankee.com/product/trundle-bed/
71	6	"Marble Roll"	February 5, 1994	606	https://www.newyankee.com/product/marble-roll/
72	7	"Storage Units: Bureau/Cupboard and Bookcase"	February 12, 1994	607	https://www.newyankee.com/product/storage-units-bureau-cupboard-and-bookcase/
73	8	"Student's Desk"	February 19, 1994	608	https://www.newyankee.com/product/students-desk/
74	9	"Rocking Chair"	February 26, 1994	609	https://www.newyankee.com/product/rocking-chair/
75	10	"Alphabet Wagon"	February 5, 1994	610	No Project Page
76	11	"High Chair"	March 12, 1994	611	No Project Page
77	12	"Playhouse (Part 1)"	March 19, 1994	612	https://www.newyankee.com/product/playhouse/
78	13	"Playhouse (Part 2)"	March 26, 1994	613	https://www.newyankee.com/product/playhouse/

=== Season 7 (1995) ===
- Starting with this season, the end credits are shown in a Copperplate font.

No. overall	No. in season	Title	Original release date	Prod. code	Project Page
79	1	"X-Brace Trestle Table"	January 7, 1995	701	https://www.newyankee.com/product/x-brace-trestle-table/
80	2	"Pergola"	January 14, 1995	702	https://www.newyankee.com/product/pergola/
81	3	"TV Tray Table"	January 21, 1995	703	https://www.newyankee.com/product/tv-tray-table/
82	4	"Outdoor Garden Table"	January 28, 1995	704	https://www.newyankee.com/product/outdoor-garden-table/
83	5	"Cherry Bathroom Vanity"	February 4, 1995	705	https://www.newyankee.com/product/cherry-bathroom-vanity/
84	6	"Lutyens Bench"	February 11, 1995	706	https://www.newyankee.com/product/lutyens-bench/
85	7	"Picture Frames"	February 18, 1995	707	https://www.newyankee.com/product/picture-frames/
86	8	"Clancy Boat (Part 1)"	February 26, 1995	708	https://www.newyankee.com/product/clancy-boat/
87	9	"Clancy Boat (Part 2)"	March 4, 1995	709	https://www.newyankee.com/product/clancy-boat/
88	10	"Gazebo (Part 1)"	March 11, 1995	710	https://www.newyankee.com/product/gazebo/
89	11	"Gazebo (Part 2)"	March 18, 1995	711	https://www.newyankee.com/product/gazebo/
90	12	"Quilt Racks"	March 25, 1995	712	https://www.newyankee.com/product/quilt-racks/
91	13	"Chimney Cupboard"	April 1, 1995	713	https://www.newyankee.com/product/chimney-cupboard/

=== Season 8 (1996) ===
- Beginning this season, Norm Abram is credited as master carpenter in the closing credits.

No. overall	No. in season	Title	Original release date	Prod. code	Project Page
92	1	"Bedside Cupboard"	January 6, 1996	801	No Project Page
93	2	"Chestnut Coffee Table"	January 13, 1996	802	https://www.newyankee.com/product/chestnut-coffee-table/
94	3	"Paymaster's Desk"	January 20, 1996	803	https://www.newyankee.com/product/paymasters-desk/
95	4	"Long Table"	January 27, 1996	804	https://www.newyankee.com/product/long-table/
96	5	"Double Dresser"	February 3, 1996	805	https://www.newyankee.com/product/double-dresser/
97	6	"Chestnut Desk"	February 10, 1996	806	https://www.newyankee.com/product/chestnut-desk/
98	7	"Irish Hutch"	February 17, 1996	807	https://www.newyankee.com/product/irish-hutch/
99	8	"Wine Storage Unit"	February 24, 1996	808	https://www.newyankee.com/product/wine-storage-unit/
100	9	"Three Turned Table Lamps"	March 2, 1996	809	https://www.newyankee.com/product/three-turned-table-lamps/
101	10	"Garden Shed and Recycling Center (Part 1)"	March 9, 1996	810	https://www.newyankee.com/product/garden-shed-and-recycling-center/
102	11	"Garden Shed and Recycling Center (Part 2)"	March 16, 1996	811	https://www.newyankee.com/product/garden-shed-and-recycling-center/
103	12	"Nest of Drawers"	March 23, 1996	812	https://www.newyankee.com/product/nest-of-drawers/
104	13	"Router Table"	March 30, 1996	813	No Project Page

=== Season 9 (1997) ===
- Starting with this season, The New Yankee Workshop introduced a new closing sequence. It shows an exterior shot of the workshop. Then, Abram opens the workshop door, and walks out to get some fresh air. Then, Abram walks back in the shop. It was also used for reruns of older episodes on HGTV.

No. overall	No. in season	Title	Original release date	Prod. code	Project Page
105	1	"Planter's Desk"	January 4, 1997	901	https://www.newyankee.com/product/planters-desk/
106	2	"Turkey Table"	January 11, 1997	902	https://www.newyankee.com/product/turkey-table/
107	3	"Nantucket Settle"	January 18, 1997	903	https://www.newyankee.com/product/nantucket-settle/
108	4	"Tiger Maple Washstand"	January 25, 1997	904	https://www.newyankee.com/product/tiger-maple-washstand/
109	5	"Dough Box"	February 1, 1997	905	https://www.newyankee.com/product/dough-box/
110	6	"Garden Gate"	February 8, 1997	906	https://www.newyankee.com/product/garden-gate/
111	7	"Serving Trays"	February 15, 1997	907	https://www.newyankee.com/product/serving-trays/
112	8	"Carousel Table"	February 22, 1997	908	https://www.newyankee.com/product/carousel-table/
113	9	"Seven Drawer Chest"	March 1, 1997	909	https://www.newyankee.com/product/seven-drawer-chest/
114	10	"Hat Rack"	March 8, 1997	910	https://www.newyankee.com/product/hat-rack/
115	11	"Greenhouse (Part 1)"	March 15, 1997	911	https://www.newyankee.com/product/greenhouse/
116	12	"Greenhouse (Part 2)"	March 22, 1997	912	https://www.newyankee.com/product/greenhouse/
117	13	"Fireplace Mantle"	March 29, 1997	913	https://www.newyankee.com/product/fireplace-mantel/

=== Season 10 (1998) ===
Season 10 introduced a new episode numbering system. Previous seasons had been numbered in three digit format using the season number (1–9) as the first digit, and the episode number making up the last two digits. So, for example, the third episode of the 4th season would be episode number 403. Starting with this season, episode numbers consisted of four digits with the first two digits representing the last two digits of the year in which the season first aired and the last two digits representing the episode number within that season. So, the fourth episode of the 10th season, having first aired in 1998, would be episode number 9804.

No. overall	No. in season	Title	Original release date	Prod. code	Project Page
118	1	"Irish Table"	January 3, 1998	9801	https://www.newyankee.com/product/irish-table/
119	2	"Linen Press"	January 10, 1998	9802	https://www.newyankee.com/product/linen-press/
120	3	"Walnut Table"	January 17, 1998	9803	https://www.newyankee.com/product/walnut-table/
121	4	"Library Ladder"	January 24, 1998	9804	https://www.newyankee.com/product/library-ladder/
122	5	"Old Pine Bar"	January 31, 1998	9805	https://www.newyankee.com/product/old-pine-bar/
123	6	"Morris Chair"	February 7, 1998	9806	https://www.newyankee.com/product/morris-chair/
124	7	"Cupola"	February 14, 1998	9807	https://www.newyankee.com/product/cupola/
125	8	"Mesquite Bookcase"	February 21, 1998	9808	https://www.newyankee.com/product/mesquite-bookcase/
126	9	"Chop Saw Station"	February 28, 1998	9809	https://www.newyankee.com/product/chop-saw-station/
127	10	"Whirligig"	March 7, 1998	9810	https://www.newyankee.com/product/whirligig/
128	11	"Chaise Lounge"	March 14, 1998	9811	https://www.newyankee.com/product/chaise-lounge/
129	12	"Roll Top Desk (Part 1)"	March 21, 1998	9812	https://www.newyankee.com/product/roll-top-desk/
130	13	"Roll Top Desk (Part 2)"	March 28, 1998	9813	https://www.newyankee.com/product/roll-top-desk/

=== Season 11 (1999) ===
No. overall	No. in season	Title	Original release date	Prod. code	Project Page
131	1	"Kitchen Island"	January 2, 1999	9901	https://www.newyankee.com/product/kitchen-island/
132	2	"Kitchen Pantry"	January 9, 1999	9902	https://www.newyankee.com/product/kitchen-pantry/
133	3	"Kitchen Secretary"	January 16, 1999	9903	https://www.newyankee.com/product/kitchen-secretary/
134	4	"Old Pine Hutch"	January 23, 1999	9904	https://www.newyankee.com/product/old-pine-hutch/
135	5	"Teak Bar"	January 30, 1999	9905	https://www.newyankee.com/product/teak-bar/
136	6	"Laundry Center"	February 6, 1999	9906	https://www.newyankee.com/product/laundry-center/
137	7	"Bake Center"	February 13, 1999	9907	https://www.newyankee.com/product/bake-center/
138	8	"Table Saw Station"	February 20, 1999	9908	https://www.newyankee.com/product/table-saw-station/
139	9	"Classic Kitchen Cabinets"	February 27, 1999	9909	https://www.newyankee.com/product/classic-kitchen-cabinets/
140	10	"Sink Base"	March 6, 1999	9910	https://www.newyankee.com/product/sink-base/
141	11	"Press Cupboard"	March 13, 1999	9911	https://www.newyankee.com/product/press-cupboard/
142	12	"Chef's Table"	March 20, 1999	9912	https://www.newyankee.com/product/chefs-table/
143	13	"Grill Cart"	March 27, 1999	9913	https://www.newyankee.com/product/grill-cart/

=== Season 12 (2000) ===
No. overall	No. in season	Title	Original release date	Prod. code	Project Page
144	1	"Garage Workshop (Part 1)"	January 1, 2000	0001	https://www.newyankee.com/product/garage-workshop/
145	2	"Garage Workshop (Part 2)"	January 8, 2000	0002	https://www.newyankee.com/product/garage-workshop/
146	3	"Planter Boxes and Bench"	January 15, 2000	0003	https://www.newyankee.com/product/planter-boxes-and-bench/
147	4	"Croquet Set and Bench"	January 22, 2000	0004	https://www.newyankee.com/product/croquet-set-and-bench/
148	5	"Hanging Porch Swing"	January 29, 2000	0005	https://www.newyankee.com/product/hanging-porch-swing/
149	6	"Computer Desk"	February 5, 2000	0006	https://www.newyankee.com/product/computer-desk/
150	7	"Patio Trolley"	February 12, 2000	0007	https://www.newyankee.com/product/patio-trolley/
151	8	"Desk Top Writing Case"	February 19, 2000	0008	https://www.newyankee.com/product/desk-top-writing-case/
152	9	"Outdoor Patio Table"	February 26, 2000	0009	https://www.newyankee.com/product/outdoor-patio-table/
153	10	"English Server"	March 4, 2000	0010	https://www.newyankee.com/product/english-server/
154	11	"Sharpening Station"	March 11, 2000	0011	https://www.newyankee.com/product/sharpening-station/
155	12	"Jewelry Case"	March 18, 2000	0012	https://www.newyankee.com/product/jewelry-case/
156	13	"Breakfront Cabinet"	March 25, 2000	0013	https://www.newyankee.com/product/breakfront-cabinet/

=== Season 13 (2001) ===
No. overall	No. in season	Title	Original release date	Prod. code	Project Page
157	1	"Jigs (Part 1)"	January 6, 2001	0101	https://www.newyankee.com/product/jigs/
158	2	"Jigs (Part 2)"	January 13, 2001	0102	https://www.newyankee.com/product/jigs/
159	3	"Hall Seat"	January 20, 2001	0103	https://www.newyankee.com/product/hall-seat/
160	4	"CD Storage Case"	January 27, 2001	0104	https://www.newyankee.com/product/cd-storage-case/
161	5	"Garden Armchair"	February 3, 2001	0105	https://www.newyankee.com/product/garden-armchair/
162	6	"Workshop Hutch"	February 10, 2001	0106	https://www.newyankee.com/product/workshop-hutch/
163	7	"Outdoor Cupboard"	February 17, 2001	0107	https://www.newyankee.com/product/outdoor-cupboard/
164	8	"Dressing Table (Part 1)"	March 3, 2001	0108	https://www.newyankee.com/product/dressing-table/
165	9	"Dressing Table (Part 2)"	February 24, 2001	0109	https://www.newyankee.com/product/dressing-table/
166	10	"Mailbox"	March 10, 2001	0110	https://www.newyankee.com/product/mailbox/
167	11	"Bath Cupboard"	March 17, 2001	0111	https://www.newyankee.com/product/bath-cupboard/
168	12	"Monastery Table"	March 24, 2001	0112	https://www.newyankee.com/product/monastery-table/
169	13	"Barrister Bookcase"	March 31, 2001	0113	https://www.newyankee.com/product/barrister-bookcase/

=== Season 14 (2002) ===
No. overall	No. in season	Title	Original release date	Prod. code	Project Page
170	1	"Miter Bench and Storage (Part 1)"	January 5, 2002	0201	https://www.newyankee.com/product/miter-bench-and-storage/
171	2	"Miter Bench and Storage (Part 2)"	January 12, 2002	0202	https://www.newyankee.com/product/miter-bench-and-storage/
172	3	"Steamer Trunk"	January 19, 2002	0203	https://www.newyankee.com/product/steamer-trunk/
173	4	"Adirondack Loveseat"	January 26, 2002	0204	https://www.newyankee.com/product/adirondack-loveseat/
174	5	"Canopy Bed"	February 2, 2002	0205	https://www.newyankee.com/product/canopy-bed/
175	6	"Shaving Stand"	February 9, 2002	0206	https://www.newyankee.com/product/shaving-stand/
176	7	"Work Table and Clamp Cart"	February 16, 2002	0207	https://www.newyankee.com/product/work-table-and-clamp-cart/
177	8	"Pedestal Table"	February 23, 2002	0208	https://www.newyankee.com/product/pedestal-table/
178	9	"Four Drawer Chest"	March 2, 2002	0209	https://www.newyankee.com/product/four-drawer-chest/
179	10	"Wooden Bowls"	March 9, 2002	0210	https://www.thisoldhouse.com/watch/wooden-bowls-new-yankee-workshop
180	11	"Nightstand"	March 16, 2002	0211	https://www.newyankee.com/product/nightstand/
181	12	"Deck Chair"	March 23, 2002	0212	https://www.newyankee.com/product/deck-chair/
182	13	"Stepback Cupboard"	March 30, 2002	0213	https://www.newyankee.com/product/stepback-cupboard/

=== Season 15 (2003) ===
No. overall	No. in season	Title	Notes	Prod. code	Project Page
183	1	"Deluxe Router Station"	A new revision of the router station Abram built in a previous episode.	0301	https://www.newyankee.com/product/deluxe-router-station/
184	2	"Sheep Shearing Coffee Table"	TBA	0302	https://www.newyankee.com/product/sheep-shearing-coffee-table/
185	3	"Queen Anne Table"	TBA	0303	https://www.newyankee.com/product/queen-anne/
186	4	"Cigar Chair (Part 1)"	TBA	0304	https://www.newyankee.com/product/cigar-chair-table/
187	5	"Cigar Chair (Part 2)"	TBA	0305	https://www.newyankee.com/product/cigar-chair-table/
188	6	"Beveled Glass Cupboard"	TBA	0306	https://www.newyankee.com/product/beveled-glass-cupboard/
189	7	"Media Press (Part 1)"	TBA	0307	https://www.newyankee.com/product/media-press/
190	8	"Media Press (Part 2)"	TBA	0308	https://www.newyankee.com/product/media-press/
191	9	"Flagpole"	TBA	0309	https://www.newyankee.com/product/flagpole/
192	10	"Regency Headboard"	TBA	0310	https://www.newyankee.com/product/regency-headboard/
193	11	"Painted Corner Hutch"	TBA	0311	https://www.newyankee.com/product/painted-corner-hutch/
194	12	"French Side Table"	TBA	0312	https://www.newyankee.com/product/french-side-table/
195	13	"Wall Mounted Tool Chest"	TBA	0313	https://www.newyankee.com/product/wall-mounted-tool-chest/

=== Season 16 (2004) ===
No. overall	No. in season	Title	Notes	Prod. code	Project Page
196	1	"The Butterfly Table"	TBA	0401	https://www.newyankee.com/product/the-butterfly-table/
197	2	"The Folding Screen"	TBA	0402	https://www.newyankee.com/product/the-folding-screen/
198	3	"The Flower Stand"	TBA	0403	https://www.newyankee.com/product/the-flower-stand/
199	4	"The Shaker Bookcase"	TBA	0404	https://www.newyankee.com/product/the-shaker-bookcase/
200	5	"The Tall Case Oak Clock"	TBA	0405	https://www.newyankee.com/product/the-tall-case-oak-clock/
201	6	"The Dower Chest"	TBA	0406	https://www.newyankee.com/product/the-dower-chest/
202	7	"The Windsor Chair (Part 1)"	TBA	0407	https://www.newyankee.com/product/the-windsor-chair/
203	8	"The Windsor Chair (Part 2)"	TBA	0408	https://www.newyankee.com/product/the-windsor-chair/
204	9	"The Lowboy"	TBA	0409	https://www.newyankee.com/product/the-lowboy/
205	10	"The Pier Table"	TBA	0410	https://www.newyankee.com/product/the-pier-table/
206	11	"The Dining Table"	TBA	0411	https://www.newyankee.com/product/the-dining-table/
207	12	"The Mission Style Desk"	TBA	0412	https://www.newyankee.com/product/the-mission-style-desk/
208	13	"The Gardener's Dry Sink"	TBA	0413	https://www.newyankee.com/product/the-gardeners-dry-sink/

=== Season 17 (2005) ===
No. overall	No. in season	Title	Notes	Prod. code	Project Page
209	1	"Hall Mirror"	TBA	0501	https://www.newyankee.com/product/hall-mirror/
210	2	"Bermuda Bench/Table"	TBA	0502	https://www.newyankee.com/product/bermuda-bench-table/
211	3	"Ottoman"	TBA	0503	https://www.newyankee.com/product/ottoman/
212	4	"Bermuda Chest"	TBA	0504	https://www.newyankee.com/product/bermuda-chest/
213	5	"Federal-Style Game Table"	TBA	0505	https://www.newyankee.com/product/federal-style-game-table/
214	6	"Lathe 101"	First in a series of tool-specific episodes that provide instruction and techniques for using a particular shop tool.	0506	https://www.newyankee.com/product/lathe-101/
215	7	"Side Chair"	TBA	0507	https://www.newyankee.com/product/side-chair/
216	8	"Tilt Top Table"	TBA	0508	https://www.newyankee.com/product/tilt-top-table/
217	9	"Highboy (Part 1)"	TBA	0509	https://www.newyankee.com/product/highboy/
218	10	"Highboy (Part 2)"	TBA	0510	https://www.newyankee.com/product/highboy/
219	11	"Kitchen Island"	TBA	0511	https://www.newyankee.com/product/kitchen-island-2/
220	12	"Carved Wooden Signs"	TBA	0512	No Project Page
221	13	"The Library System"	TBA	0513	https://www.newyankee.com/product/the-library-system/

=== Season 18 (2006) ===
No. overall	No. in season	Title	Notes	Prod. code	Project Page
222	1	"Colonial Style Mantel"	TBA	0601	https://www.newyankee.com/product/colonial-style-mantel/
223	2	"Plantation Shutters"	TBA	0602	https://www.newyankee.com/product/plantation-shutters/
224	3	"Workshop Helpers"	TBA	0603	https://www.newyankee.com/product/workshop-helpers/
225	4	"Poker Table"	TBA	0604	https://www.newyankee.com/product/poker-table/
226	5	"New Yankee Shop Clock"	TBA	0605	https://www.newyankee.com/product/new-yankee-shop-clock/
227	6	"Router 101 (Part 1)"	Continuation of a series of tool-specific episodes that provide instruction and techniques for using a particular shop tool.	0606	No Project Page
228	7	"Router 101 (Part 2)"	TBA	0607	No Project Page
229	8	"Corner Table"	TBA	0608	https://www.newyankee.com/product/corner-table/
230	9	"Greek Revival Bookcase"	TBA	0609	https://www.newyankee.com/product/greek-revival-bookcase/
231	10	"Storage Shed"	TBA	0610	https://www.newyankee.com/product/storage-shed/
232	11	"Wall Hung Console"	TBA	0611	https://www.newyankee.com/product/wall-hung-console/
233	12	"Corner Chair"	TBA	0612	https://www.newyankee.com/product/corner-chair/
234	13	"Wall Paneling"	TBA	0613	https://www.newyankee.com/product/wall-paneling/

=== Season 19 (2007) ===
No. overall	No. in season	Title	Notes	Prod. code	Project Page
235	1	"Giltwood Mirror"	TBA	0701	https://www.newyankee.com/product/giltwood-mirror/
236	2	"Entrance Door"	TBA	0702	https://www.newyankee.com/product/entrance-door/
237	3	"Old Pine Dry Sink"	TBA	0703	https://www.newyankee.com/product/old-pine-dry-sink/
238	4	"Martha's Candlestand"	TBA	0704	https://www.newyankee.com/product/marthas-candlestand/
239	5	"Dominy Clock"	TBA	0705	https://www.newyankee.com/product/dominy-clock/
240	6	"Cowboy Sideboard"	TBA	0706	https://www.newyankee.com/product/cowboy-sideboard/
241	7	"Painted Cupboard"	TBA	0707	https://www.newyankee.com/product/painted-cupboard/
242	8	"Table Saw 101 (Part 1)"	Continuation of a series of tool-specific episodes that provide instruction and techniques for using a particular shop tool.	0708	https://www.newyankee.com/product/table-saw-101-part-1-2/
243	9	"Table Saw 101 (Part 2)"	TBA	0709	https://www.newyankee.com/product/table-saw-101-part-1-2/
244	10	"Taunton Chest"	TBA	0710	https://www.newyankee.com/product/taunton-chest/
245	11	"Bowfront Chest"	TBA	0711	https://www.newyankee.com/product/bowfront-chest/
246	12	"Nest of Tables"	TBA	0712	https://www.newyankee.com/product/nest-of-tables/
247	13	"Window Bench"	TBA	0713	https://www.newyankee.com/product/window-bench/

=== Season 20 (2008) ===
Season 20 varied slightly in format from previous seasons in that the first nine episodes were devoted to a single, larger project. This project involved a kitchen remodeling and focused on cabinet construction. The kitchen being remodeled belongs to Morash. Season 20 also represented the last season in which original projects were constructed for the show.

No. overall	No. in season	Title	Notes	Prod. code	Project Page
248	1	"Kitchen Cabinet Basics (Part 1)"	TBA	0801	http://www.newyankee.com/getproduct.php?0801
249	2	"Kitchen Cabinet Basics (Part 2)"	TBA	0802	http://www.newyankee.com/getproduct.php?0801
250	3	"The Hot Wall"	TBA	0803	http://www.newyankee.com/getproduct.php?0803
251	4	"The Wet Wall"	TBA	0804	http://www.newyankee.com/getproduct.php?0804
252	5	"The Pantry"	TBA	0805	http://www.newyankee.com/getproduct.php?0805
253	6	"The Kitchen Office"	TBA	0806	http://www.newyankee.com/getproduct.php?0806
254	7	"The Island"	TBA	0807	http://www.newyankee.com/getproduct.php?0807
255	8	"The Wet Bar"	TBA	0808	http://www.newyankee.com/getproduct.php?0808
256	9	"Finish and Install"	TBA	0809	http://www.newyankee.com/getproduct.php?0809
257	10	"Adirondack Trio"	TBA	0810	https://www.newyankee.com/product/adirondack-trio/
258	11	"All-Weather Loveseat"	TBA	0811	https://www.newyankee.com/product/all-weather-loveseat/
259	12	"Lolling Chair"	TBA	0812	https://www.newyankee.com/product/lolling-chair/
260	13	"Tap Table"	Last original project built.	0813	https://www.newyankee.com/product/tap-table/

=== Season 21 (2009) ===
Season 21 stood out from other seasons in that it had approximately twice the number of episodes of any previous season. The season also varied from previous seasons in that no new projects were built. Instead each episode rebroadcast a project built in a previous season. All of the rebroadcast episodes were from either the ninth or tenth season. Each "new" episode consisted of the original episode prefaced by a newly recorded introduction by Abram.

No. overall	No. in season	Title	Notes	Prod. code
261	1	"Planter's Desk"	Original episode #901.	0901
262	2	"Turkey Table"	Original episode #902.	0902
263	3	"Nantucket Settle"	Original episode #903.	0903
264	4	"Tiger Maple Washstand"	Original episode #904.	0904
265	5	"Dough Box"	Original episode #905.	0905
266	6	"Garden Gate"	Original episode #906.	0906
267	7	"Serving Trays"	Original episode #907.	0907
268	8	"Carousel Table"	Original episode #908.	0908
269	9	"Seven Drawer Chest"	Original episode #909.	0909
270	10	"Hat Rack"	Original episode #910.	0910
271	11	"Greenhouse (Part 1)"	Original episodes #911/#912.	0911
272	12	"Greenhouse (Part 2)"	Original episodes #911/#912.	0912
273	13	"Fireplace Mantle"	Original episode #913.	0913
274	14	"Irish Table"	Original episode #9801.	0914
275	15	"Linen Press"	Original episode #9802.	0915
276	16	"Walnut Table"	Original episode #9803.	0916
277	17	"Library Ladder"	Original episode #9804.	0917
278	18	"Old Pine Bar"	Original episode #9805.	0918
279	19	"Morris Chair"	Original episode #9806.	0919
280	20	"Cupola"	Original episode #9807.	0920
281	21	"Mesquite Bookcase"	Original episode #9808.	0921
282	22	"Chop Saw Station"	Original episode #9809.	0922
283	23	"Whirligig"	Original episode #9810.	0923
284	24	"Chaise Lounge"	Original episode #9811.	0924
285	25	"Roll Top Desk (Part 1)"	Original episodes #9812/#9813.	0925
286	26	"Roll Top Desk (Part 2)"	Original episodes #9812/#9813.	0926
