= Brooks (surname) =

- Pronunciation: Plural Brookses; possessive Brooks's, Brookses'

Origin
- Meaning: "residing near a stream or brook"
- Region of origin: England / Anjou, France / Germany / Scandinavia

The word brook derives from the Old English broc and appears in the Medieval predecessors of Brooks (Ate-Broc and Atte-Broc). The surname arrived in North America from England in the mid-seventeenth century.

The surname Brooks is recorded in Ireland from the 1600s. O'Laughlin reports that "some of the name could stem from Irish origins, the name being changed into the English word 'Brook' or Brooks." The surname is also found among English-speaking Ashkenazi Jews, deriving from the male Hebrew given name Boruch ("blessed").

== A ==
- A. Brooks (Middlesex cricketer) (born c. 1800), English cricketer
- Aaron Brooks (disambiguation), multiple people
- Abraham Brooks (1852–1925), English cricketer
- Adam Brooks (disambiguation), multiple people
- Adrian Brooks (born 1957), English soccer player
- Ahmad Brooks (born 1984), American football player
- Ahmad D. Brooks (born 1980), American football player and sports broadcaster
- Aimee Brooks (born 1974), American actress
- Albert Brooks (born 1947), American actor, comedian, and director
- Alden Brooks (1882–1964), American writer
- Alex Brooks (born 1976), American ice hockey player
- Alexandra Brooks (born 1995), English footballer
- Alfred Brooks (disambiguation), multiple people
- Alison Brooks (born 1962), Canadian architect
- Allan Brooks (1869–1946), Canadian ornithologist and bird artist
- Allette Brooks (fl. 1996–2001), American folk singer
- Allison Brooks (1917–2006), American aviator
- Alvin Brooks (basketball, born 1959), American basketball coach
- Alvin Brooks III, American basketball coach
- Amanda Brooks (born 1981), American actress
- Amber Brooks (born 1991), American soccer player
- Ameal Brooks (1904–1971), American baseball player
- Andy Brooks, British Communist leader
- Angel Brooks, character on the Australian soap opera Home and Away
- Angela Brooks, American architect, partner in Brooks + Scarpa
- Angelle Brooks (born 1967), American actress
- Angie Brooks (1928–2007), Liberian diplomat and jurist
- Annabel Brooks (born 1962), British actress
- Anne Brooks (born 1938), American physician and nun
- Anne Rose Brooks (born 1963), American actress
- Anthony Brooks (1922–2007), British undercover agent
- Anthony Michael Brooks (born 1993), American speedcuber
- Antoine Brooks (born 1997), American football player
- April Brooks, real name of wrestler AJ Lee
- Archie Brooks, fictional character from the British soap opera Emmerdale
- Art Brooks, see Arthur Brooks (disambiguation)
- Arthur Brooks (disambiguation), multiple people
- Audrey Brooks (1933–2018), British botanist
- Avery Brooks (born 1948), American actor

== B ==
- Barney Brooks (1884–1952), American physician
- Barrett Brooks (born 1972), American football player
- Barry Brooks (disambiguation), multiple people
- Beau Brooks, member of The Janoskians
- Ben Brooks, see Benjamin Brooks (disambiguation)
- Benjamin Brooks (disambiguation), multiple people
- Berry Boswell Brooks (1902–1976), American cotton broker and big-game hunter
- Bert Brooks (1920–1968), Canadian race car driver
- Beverley Brooks (1929–1992), stage name of British actress Pamela Harmsworth, Viscountess Rothermere
- Bill Brooks (disambiguation), multiple people
- Billy Brooks (born 1953), American football player
- Bob or Bobby Brooks, see Robert Brooks (disambiguation)
- Bonnie Brooks (born 1953), Canadian department store executive
- Bradley Brooks (born 2000), darts player
- Brandon Brooks (disambiguation), multiple people
- Brendan Brooks (born 1978), Canadian ice hockey player
- British Brooks (born 1999), American football player
- Brittany Brooks (born 1985), American musician
- Bruce Brooks (born 1950), American author
- Bryant Butler Brooks (1861–1944), American politician
- Bubba Brooks (1922–2002), American saxophonist
- Bucky Brooks (born 1971), American sportswriter
- Bud Brooks (1930–2005), American football player

== C ==
- Caroline Shawk Brooks (1840–1913), American sculptor
- Cat Brooks, American activist
- Cecil Brooks III (born 1959), American jazz drummer
- Cecil Joslin Brooks (1875–1953), British metallurgical chemist and naturalist
- Cedric Brooks (1943–2013), Jamaican saxophonist and flautist
- Chandler McCuskey Brooks (1905–1989), American physiologist
- Charles Brooks (disambiguation), multiple people
- Charlie Brooks (born 1981), Welsh actress
- Charlie Brooks (racehorse trainer) (born 1963), British racehorse trainer
- Charlotte Brooks (1918–2014), American photojournalist
- Charmaine Brooks (born 1970), Canadian singer-songwriter
- Chase Brooks, American soccer player and coach
- Cherryl Brooks, fictional character from Atlas Shrugged
- Chet Brooks (1966–2026), American football player
- Chris Brooks (disambiguation), multiple people
- Clifford Cleveland Brooks, American politician
- Cindy Brooks (model) (born 1951), American model and actress
- Cindy Brooks (rower) (born 1965), American rower
- Claire Brooks (1931–2008), British politician
- Cleanth Brooks (1906–1994), American literary critic
- Clifford Brooks (born 1949), American football player
- Clive Brooks (1949–2017), English drummer
- Coby G. Brooks (born 1969), American businessman
- Colin Brooks (disambiguation), multiple people
- Collin Brooks (1893–1959), British journalist, writer and broadcaster
- Conrad Brooks (1931–2017), American actor
- Corey Brooks (1896–1944), American politician
- Corrin Brooks-Meade (1988–2025), English-born Montserratian footballer
- Curtis Brooks (born 1998), American football player
- Constance "Connie" Brooks (see Our Miss Brooks), fictional English language teacher

== D ==
- D. W. Brooks (1901–1969), American farmer and businessman
- Dallas Brooks (1896–1966), Australian general and politician
- Dalton Brooks (born 2004), American football player
- Daniel Brooks, American clothier, one of the Brooks Brothers
- Daniel Brooks (1958–2023), Canadian theatre director, actor and playwright
- Danny Brooks (born 1951), Canadian blues musician
- Darin Brooks (born 1984), American actor
- Darren Brooks (born 1982), American basketball player
- David Brooks (commentator) (born 1961), American journalist, commentator, editor
- David Brooks (inventor), American inventor
- David Brooks (American politician) (1756–1838), American politician
- David Brooks (rugby union) (1924–2002), British Lions & England international rugby union player
- David Brooks (author) (born 1953), Australian writer
- David Brooks (rugby league) (born 1962), Australian rugby league footballer
- David Brooks (actor) (1915–1999), American actor
- David Brooks (ice hockey) (born 1939), American retired ice hockey player
- David Brooks (footballer) (born 1997), Wales international footballer
- David Brooks (artist) (born 1975), American artist
- David Brooks (lord mayor) (1864–1930), English politician, Lord Mayor of Birmingham 1917–1919
- David Brooks (Northern Irish politician), British politician, Democratic Unionist party member
- David H. M. Brooks (1950–1996), South African philosopher
- David Owen Brooks (1955–2020), American serial killer
- Dean Brooks (1916–2013), American physician and actor
- Deanna Brooks (born 1974), American model
- Delray Brooks (born 1965), American basketball player and coach
- De'Mon Brooks, (born 1992), American basketball player
- Derreck Brooks (born 1994), American basketball player
- Derrick Brooks (born 1973), American football player
- Derrius Brooks (born 1988), American football player
- Desley Brooks, American politician
- Dianne Brooks (1939–2005), American jazz singer
- Dick or Dickie Brooks, see Richard Brooks (disambiguation)
- Dillon Brooks (born 1996), Canadian basketball player
- Dolores "LaLa" Brooks (born 1947), member of girl group The Crystals
- Don Frank Brooks (1947–2000), American blues harmonica player
- Donald Brooks (1928–2005), American fashion designer
- Donnie Brooks (1936–2007), American pop music singer
- Douglas Jackson Brooks (born 1956), American country music singer, known as Doug Stone
- Dudley Brooks (1913–1989), American jazz pianist
- Durant Brooks (born 1985), American football player
- Dustin Brooks, from Power Rangers Ninja Storm
- Dustin Brooks, from Zoey 101
- Duwayne Brooks (born 1974), English politician

== E ==
- Earl Brooks (1929–2010), American race car driver
- Earl Brooks, title character of the film Mr. Brooks
- Ed Brooks, see Edward Brooks (disambiguation)
- Edgar Brooks (1914–1986), English rugby league footballer
- Edmund Wright Brooks (1834–1928), English Quaker philanthropist and cement maker
- Edward Brooks (disambiguation), multiple people
- Edwin Brooks (born 1929), British-Australian politician and academic
- Edwin B. Brooks (1868–1933), American politician
- Edwy Searles Brooks (1889–1965), British novelist
- Elbridge Streeter Brooks (1846–1902), American author, editor and critic
- Elisabeth Brooks (1951–1997), Canadian actress
- Elisha Brooks, American clothier, one of the Brooks Brothers
- Elizabeth Carter Brooks (1867–1951), American architect, educator and social activist
- Elkie Brooks (born 1945), British singer
- Ellen Brooks (born 1946), American photographer
- Elmore Brooks (1918–1963), American blues guitarist, better known as Elmore James
- Erastus Brooks (1815–1886), New York newspaper editor and politician
- Eric Brooks (disambiguation), multiple people
- Ernest Brooks (disambiguation), multiple people
- Errol Brooks (born 1951), Antiguan bishop
- Ethan Brooks (born 1972), American football player
- Eugene C. Brooks (1871–1947), American educator

== F ==
- Farmer Brooks (1957–2022), Canadian wrestler
- Foster Brooks (1912–2001), American comedian
- Francis Gerard Brooks (1924–2010), Northern Ireland Roman Catholic bishop
- Francis K. Brooks (born 1943), American educator and Vermont Democratic politician
- Frank Brooks (disambiguation), multiple people
- Frank Leonard Brooks (1911–2011), Canadian artist
- Frankie Brooks, fictional character in the Australian soap opera Home and Away
- Franklin E. Brooks (1860–1916), American Republican politician
- Frederick Brooks (disambiguation), also includes Fred and Freddie Brooks

== G ==
- Gabriel Brooks (1704–1741), English calligrapher
- Gabrielle Brooks (born 1990), English actress
- Gareth Brooks (born 1979), New Zealand field hockey player
- Garrison Brooks (born 1999), American basketball player
- Garth Brooks (born 1962), American country musician
- Gary Brooks (born 1980), Jamaican football player
- Gene Edward Brooks (1931–2004), American judge
- George Brooks (disambiguation), multiple people
- Georgia Brooks, fictional character from the soap opera Neighbours
- Gerald Brooks (1905–1974), Belizean bishop
- Geraldine Brooks (disambiguation), multiple people
- Glenn Brooks, Canadian politician
- Golden Brooks (born 1970), American actress
- Gordon Brooks (disambiguation), multiple people
- Greg Brooks (disambiguation), multiple people
- Gregory Brooks, American poker player
- Guy Brooks, American fiddle player
- Gwendolyn Brooks, (1917–2000), American poet

== H ==
- H. Allen Brooks (1925–2010), American architectural historian
- H. H. Brooks, co-founder of the Herff-Brooks Corporation
- Hadda Brooks, American pianist
- Halbert W. Brooks (born 1985), American politician
- Hannibal Brooks, fictional character from the film of the same name
- Harold Brooks (disambiguation), multiple people
- Harriet Brooks (1876–1933), Canadian physicist
- Harry Brooks (disambiguation), multiple people
- Harvey Brooks (bassist) (born 1944), American bassist
- Harvey Brooks (physicist) (1915–2004), American physicist
- Harvey Oliver Brooks (1899–1968), American pianist and composer
- Hazel Brooks (1924–2002), American actress
- Helen Brooks, pseudonym of British novelist Rita Bradshaw
- Hellen M. Brooks (1862–1931), American educator and politician
- Henderson Brooks, Indian general, co-author of the Henderson Brooks–Bhagat Report
- Henry Brooks (disambiguation), multiple people
- Herb Brooks (1937–2003), American ice hockey coach
- Hillery Brooks, American planter, for whom Brooks, Georgia, was named
- Holly Brooks (born 1982), American skier
- Holly Brooks, fictional character on the TV show Malcolm & Eddie
- Horace Brooks (1814–1894), American army officer
- Horatio G. Brooks (1828–1887), American rail engineer
- Hubert Brooks (1921–1984), Canadian air force officer and hockey player
- Hubie Brooks (born 1956), American baseball player

== I ==
- Ian James Brooks (1928–2022), New Zealand politician
- Irvin Brooks (1891–1966), American baseball player

== J ==
- J. Stewart Brooks (1910–2000), Canadian politician
- J. Twing Brooks (1884–1956), American politician
- Jack Brooks (disambiguation), multiple people
- Ja'Corey Brooks (born 2001), American football player
- Jade Brooks, Canadian author and activist
- Jai Brooks, member of Australian group The Janoskians
- Jalen Brooks (born 2000), American football player
- Jamal Brooks (born 1976), American football player
- James Brooks (disambiguation), multiple people
- James L. Brooks (born 1940), American film and television director, producer and screenwriter
- Jamie Brooks (born 1983), English football player
- Janice Young Brooks (1943–2023), birth name of American mystery writer Jill Churchill
- Jarred Brooks (born 1993), American mixed martial artist
- Jarrod Brooks, American politician
- Jason Brooks (disambiguation), multiple people
- Jean Brooks (1915–1963), American actress
- Jeff Brooks (born 1989), American-Italian basketball player
- Jeffrey Brooks (born 1956), American composer
- Jehiel Brooks (1797–1886), American soldier and politician
- Jeremy Brooks (1926–1994), British writer
- Jerry Brooks (born 1967), American baseball player
- Jess Lee Brooks (1894–1944), American actor
- Jessica Brooks (born 1981), English actress
- Jim or Jimmy Brooks, see James Brooks (disambiguation)
- Joanna Brooks (born 1971), American author and professor
- Jody Brooks (1941–2022), American country music singer, better known as Jody Miller
- Joe Brooks, see Joseph Brooks (disambiguation)
- Joel Brooks (born 1949), American actor
- John Brooks (disambiguation), multiple people
- John J. Brooks, American lawman
- Johnny Brooks (1931–2016), English footballer
- Jon Brooks (disambiguation), multiple people
- Jordyn Brooks (born 1997), American football player
- Joseph Brooks (disambiguation), multiple people
- Joshua Brooks (disambiguation), multiple people
- Josh Brooks (born 1980), College athletic director
- Josie Brooks, fictional character from the British soap opera Brookside
- Juanita Brooks (1898–1989), American writer
- Julia Evangeline Brooks (1882–1948), American educator
- Justin Brooks (born 1965), American attorney

== K ==
- Karen Brooks (disambiguation), multiple people
- Karl Brooks (born 2000), American football player
- Kate Brooks (born 1977), American photojournalist
- Kate Brooks (astronomer), Australian astronomer
- Katherine Brooks (born 1976), American film writer and director
- Keion Brooks Jr. (born 2000), American basketball player
- Kendra Brooks (born 1972), American politician
- Kennedy Brooks (born 1998), American football player
- Kenny Brooks (born 1968), American basketball coach
- Kevin Brooks (disambiguation), multiple people
- Kimberly Brooks (born 1968), American actress
- Kix Brooks (born 1955), American country musician, Brooks & Dunn
- Koleen Brooks (born 1965), American politician and model
- K. S. Brooks (born 1963), American writer and photographer

== L ==
- Lance Brooks (born 1984), American discus thrower
- Larry Brooks (disambiguation), multiple people
- Lawrence Brooks (fl. 1940s–1960s), American singer and actor
- Lawrence Brooks (American veteran) (1909–2022)
- Lee Brooks (born 1983), American composer
- Lela Brooks (1908–1990), Canadian skater
- Leo Brooks (American football) (1947–2002), American football player
- Leo A. Brooks Jr. (born 1957), American general
- Leo A. Brooks Sr. (born 1932), American general
- Leslie Brooks (1922–2011), American actress
- Lexie Brooks, fictional character on the American soap opera Days of Our Lives
- Linton Brooks (born 1938), American diplomat
- Linus Brooks, early settler in Brooks, Oregon
- Lleyton Brooks (born 2001), Australian footballer
- Lonnie Brooks (1933–2017), American blues musician
- Lorie Brooks, fictional character on the soap opera The Young and the Restless
- Louise Brooks (1906–1985), American actress and dancer
- Louise Cromwell Brooks (c. 1890–1965), American socialite
- Louise Susannah Brooks, fictional character from the British sitcom Two Pints of Lager and a Packet of Crisps
- Lucy Ann Brooks (1835–1926), English temperance advocate
- Luke Brooks (born 1994), Australian rugby player
- Luke Brooks (singer), member of the Australian group The Janoskians
- Lyall Brooks (born 1978), Australian actor
- Lydia Brooks (1818–1905), Labradorian diarist, better known by her married name, Lydia Campbell
- Lyman Brooks (1910–1984), American educator

== M ==
- Macey Brooks (born 1975), American football player
- Malcolm Brooks (1930–2020), Australian politician
- Mandy Brooks (1897–1976), American baseball player
- Maria Gowen Brooks (1794–1845), American poet
- Marion E. Brooks, American environmentalist, for whom Marion Brooks Natural Area was named
- Mark Brooks (disambiguation), multiple people
- Marshall Brooks (1855–1944), British sportsman
- MarShon Brooks (born 1989), American basketball player
- Martha Brooks (born 1944), Canadian writer
- Martin E. Brooks (1925–2015), American actor
- Marva Jean Brooks, Muddy Waters's wife
- Mary Brooks (1907–2002), director of the U.S. Mint
- Mason Brooks (born 1999), American football player
- Matilda Moldenhauer Brooks (1888–1981), American botanist
- Maurice Brooks (naturalist) (1900–1993), American naturalist
- Max Brooks, American novelist
- Max Brooks (politician) (born 1972), American politician from Colorado
- McKenna Brooks, fictional character from American Girl
- Mehcad Brooks (born 1980), American actor
- Mel Brooks (born 1926), American comic actor, writer, director, and theatrical producer
- Meredith Brooks (born 1958), American musician
- Merv Brooks (1919–2011), Australian football player
- Micah Brooks (1775–1857), American politician
- Michael Brooks (disambiguation), multiple people
- Michele Brooks, American politician
- Mike Brooks, see Michael Brooks (disambiguation)
- Milton Brooks (1901–1956), American photographer
- Mo Brooks (born 1954), American politician
- Morgan Brooks (1861–1947), American engineer
- Myra Brooks Turner (1936–2017), American composer, educator, and writer

== N ==
- Nan Brooks, American illustrator
- Nate Brooks (American football) (born 1996), American football player
- Nathan Eugene Brooks (1933–2020), American boxer
- Nathan C. Brooks (1809–1898), American educator
- Natrone Brooks (born 1999), American football player
- Ned Brooks, American broadcaster
- Neil Brooks (born 1962), Australian swimmer
- Nicole Paige Brooks, contestant on American reality TV show RuPaul's Drag Race (season 2)
- Nigel Brooks (1936–2024), English composer
- Noah Brooks (1830–1903), American journalist
- Noel Edgell Brooks, Canadian railway engineer, for whom Brooks, Alberta, was named
- Nona L. Brooks (1861–1945), American minister
- Norman Brooks (disambiguation), multiple people
- Nysier Brooks (born 1996), American basketball player

== O ==
- Oliver Brooks (1889–1940), British soldier
- Oswald Brooks (born c. 1935), Jamaican trumpet player
- Overton Brooks (1897–1961), American politician

== P ==
- Pamela Brooks (born 1966), British writer
- Patricia Brooks (1937–1993), American opera singer
- Pattie Brooks, American singer
- Patty Brooks, fictional character in the American TV show 24
- Paul Brooks (born 1959), British film producer
- Paul Brooks (author) (1909–1998), American nature writer and editor
- Paul Brooks (cricketer) (1921–1946), English cricketer
- Paula Brooks, DC Comics supervillain
- Paula Brooks (politician) (born 1953), American politician
- Perry Brooks (1954–2010), American football player
- Peter Brooks (disambiguation), multiple people
- Philip Brooks (disambiguation), multiple people
- Phillips Brooks, American Episcopalian bishop and writer
- Phyllis Brooks (1915–1995), American actress and model
- Preston Brooks (1819–1857), American politician
- Priest Joseph Brooks (born 1972), American hip hop producer and rapper, known by the stage name Soopafly

== Q ==
- Quincy Brooks IV (born 1977), American rapper, known by the stage name San Quinn

== R ==
- R. L. Brooks, American singer-guitarist in the band Flee the Seen
- R. Leonard Brooks (1916–1993), British mathematician
- Ralph D. Brooks, Colorado School of Mines benefactor, for whom Brooks Field was named
- Ralph G. Brooks (1898–1960), American politician
- Ramy Brooks (born 1968), American dog racer
- Rand Brooks (1918–2003), American actor
- Randi Brooks (born 1954), American Actress
- Randy Brooks (disambiguation), multiple people
- Ray Brooks (disambiguation), multiple people
- Rayshard Brooks (1993–2020), American shot dead by police in Atlanta
- Rebekah Brooks (born 1968), British journalist
- Reggie Brooks (born 1971), American football player
- Reva Brooks (1913–2004), Canadian photographer
- Rich Brooks, see Richard Brooks (disambiguation)
- Richard Brooks (disambiguation), multiple people
- Rob Brooks, American ice hockey team owner
- Robert Brooks (disambiguation), multiple people
- Robin Brooks (disambiguation), multiple people
- Rodney Brooks (born 1954), director of the MIT Computer Science and Artificial Intelligence Laboratory
- Rodregis Brooks (born 1978), American football player
- Romaine Brooks (1874–1970), American painter
- Ron Brooks (born 1988), American football player
- Ron Brooks, American rapper, known by the stage name Money-B
- Ronnie Brooks (Law & Order: UK), fictional character from Law & Order: UK
- Ronnie Baker Brooks (born 1967), American blues guitarist
- Rory and Elizabeth Brooks, British philanthropists after whom the Brooks World Poverty Institute was named
- Rosa Brooks (born 1970), American law professor
- Ross Brooks (born 1937), Canadian ice hockey player
- Roy Brooks (1938–2005), American jazz drummer
- Ruby Brooks (1861–1906), American banjoist
- Rusty Brooks (1958–2021), American wrestler
- Ryan Brooks (born 1988) American basketball player

== S ==
- Sacha Brooks, British DJ
- Samuel Brooks (disambiguation), including Sam and Sammy, multiple people
- Scott Brooks (born 1965), American basketball player
- Scott Martin Brooks (born 1972), American actor
- Shanon Brooks, American university president
- Shamarh Brooks (born 1988), Barbadian cricketer
- Sharon Sanders Brooks, American politician from Missouri
- Shauna Brooks (actress), American actress and artist
- Shaundelle Brooks, American politician from Tennessee
- Sheila Brooks, American journalist
- Sheldon Brooks (1811–1883), American businessman, physician, and politician
- Shelton Brooks (1886–1975), American popular music composer
- Shepher Brooks, owner of the Shepherd Brooks Estate
- Sheri-Ann Brooks (born 1983), Jamaican sprinter
- Shirley Brooks (1816–1874), English journalist and novelist
- Shirley Brooks, plaintiff/appellee in Flagg Brothers, Inc. v. Brooks
- Sidney Johnson Brooks Jr. (died 1917), American aviator for whom Brooks Air Force Base was named
- Sierra Brooks (gymnast) (born 2001), American gymnast
- Simon Brooks (disambiguation), multiple people
- Siobhan Brooks (born 1972), American sociologist and activist
- Stacy Brooks (born 1952), public critic of the Church of Scientology
- Stan Brooks (radio broadcaster) (1927–2013), American radio broadcaster
- Stanley Brooks, American film and television producer
- Stella Brooks (1910–2002), American jazz vocalist
- Stennett H. Brooks (died 2004), American pastor
- Stephen Brooks (disambiguation), multiple people
- Steve Brooks, see Stephen Brooks (disambiguation)
- Stratton D. Brooks (1870–1949), American educator
- Stuart M. Brooks (born 1936), American pulmonary doctor
- Sue Brooks (born 1953), Australian film director and producer
- Susan Brooks (born 1960), American politician
- Susan Brooks, plaintiff in Brooks v. Canada Safeway Ltd.
- Sydney Brooks (1872–1937), British author and critic
- Sylvia Brooks, American jazz musician

== T ==
- Tamara Brooks (1941–2012), American choral conductor
- Ted Brooks (1898–1960), English cricketer
- Terrance Brooks (1963–2011), American football player and coach
- Terrence Brooks (born 1991), American football player
- Terron Brooks (born 1974), American singer and actor
- Terry Brooks (born 1944), American author
- Terry Brooks (basketball) (born 1967), American basketball player
- Theodore Marley Brooks, fictional character from Doc Savage
- Thomas Brooks (disambiguation), multiple people
- Tia Brooks (born 1990), American shot putter
- Tiffany Brooks (baseball) (born 1977), American baseball player
- Tim Brooks (disambiguation), multiple people
- Timothy L. Brooks (born 1964), American attorney
- Tina Brooks (1932–1974), American jazz saxophonist
- Tom or Tommy Brooks, see Thomas Brooks (disambiguation)
- Tony Brooks (racing driver) (1932–2022), British racing driver
- Tony Brooks (American football) (born 1969), American football player
- Tracey Brooks, American politician
- Traci Brooks (born 1975), Canadian wrestler
- Travis Brooks (born 1980), Australian field hockey player
- Trenton Brooks (born 1995), American baseball player
- Trevor Brooks (born 1975), British alleged terrorist, also known as Abu Izzadeen

== V ==
- Van Wyck Brooks (1896–1963), American writer
- Vaushaun Brooks (born 1980), American hip hop record producer, known by the stage name Maestro
- Vic Brooks (born 1948), English cricketer
- Victor Brooks (actor) (1918–2000), English actor
- Victor Brooks (athlete) (born 1941), Jamaican long jumper
- Vincent Brooks (disambiguation), multiple people

== W ==
- Wallis Brooks (fl. 2002), American politician from Pennsylvania
- Walter Brooks, multiple people
- Wayne Baker Brooks (born 1970), American blues musician
- Wiley Brooks (1936–2016), founder of the Breatharian Institute of America
- Wilks Brooks, owner of the Wilks Brooks House
- Will Brooks (born 1986), American mixed martial artist
- William Brooks (disambiguation), multiple people
- Wyndham Brooks, pen name of American horror author Wayne Robbins

== Z ==
- Zoey Brooks, title character of the American TV show Zoey 101

== Compound surnames ==
- Harold Brooks-Baker, American journalist
- Ruth Brooks Flippen (1921–1981), American screenwriter
- Reginald Brooks-King (1861–1938), Welsh archer
- Corrin Brooks-Meade (born 1988), English footballer
- Renel Brooks-Moon (born 1958), American public address announcer
- Ellenese Brooks-Simms, Louisiana school official
- John Brooks Close-Brooks (1850–1914), English banker and amateur rower, who competed as John Brooks Close
- Caroline St John-Brooks, British journalist and academic
- Birnie Stephenson-Brooks, Guayanese judge

== See also ==
- Brooks baronets
- Brooks–McFarland feud
- Brooks (disambiguation)
- Brook (surname)
- Brooke (surname)
- Brookes (disambiguation)
