= Allette =

Allette is a given name. Notable people with the name include:

- Allette Brooks, American folk singer/songwriter
- Verna Allette Wilkins, author, founder of Tamarind Books

== See also ==
- Alette, commune in the Pas-de-Calais department in northern France
