= Creason =

Creason is a surname. Notable people with the surname include:

- Glen Creason, American librarian
- Joe Creason (1918–1974), American journalist
- Mary Rawlinson Creason (1924–2021), American aviator
- Norwood Creason (1918–2009), American politician from Missouri
- Sammy Creason (1944–1995), American percussionist
- Todd E. Creason (born 1967), American writer
