= Joseph Brooks =

Joseph or Joe Brooks may refer to:

== Arts and entertainment ==
- Joe Brooks (actor) (1924–2007), American actor
- Joseph Brooks (songwriter) (1938–2011), American composer, director, producer and screenwriter
- Joe Brooks (singer) (born 1987), British singer-songwriter
- Joe Brooks (music producer), co-producer and musician on the 2000 album The Color of Silence

== Sports ==
- Joseph Brooks (cricketer) (1870–1937), English cricketer
- Joe Brooks (footballer, born 1885) (1885–1944), English footballer
- Joe Brooks (footballer, fl. 1902–1915), English association football player
- Joseph W. Brooks (active 1909–1921), American football player and coach
- Joe Brooks (fly fisherman) (1901–1972), American fisherman and writer about the sport
- Joe Brooks (baseball) (fl. 1942), American baseball pitcher in the Negro leagues
- Joe Brooks (coach) (1922–1990), American football, basketball, and baseball coach, athletics administrator, and educator

== Others ==
- Joseph Brooks (politician) (1812–1877), American Methodist minister and politician
- Joseph B. Brooks (c. 1840–after 1900), Arkansas politician
- Joseph E. Brooks (1942–2022), American politician, journalist and social service agency director
- Joe Brooks (researcher) (born 1960), American electronics researcher
