= Edward Brooks =

Edward Brooks may refer to:

- Edward Brooks (EastEnders), fictional character
- Edward Brooks (educator) (1831–1912), American educator
- Edward Brooks (VC) (1883–1944), English recipient of the Victoria Cross
- Edward Brooks (Wisconsin politician) (1942–2019), American politician
- Edward Brooks, Sr., American lumber magnate, see Eastcliff (mansion)
- Edward H. Brooks (1893–1978), American army general
- Edward Pennell Brooks (1896–1991), founding dean of the MIT Sloan School of Management
- Edward S. Brooks (1867–1957), American politician
- Edward Towle Brooks (1830–1897), Canadian lawyer, judge and politician
- Edward Brooks (minister) (1733–1781), American Congregational minister
- Ted Brooks (Edward William John Brooks, 1898–1960), English cricketer
- Ned Brooks (footballer) (Edward A. Brooks, 1881–1958), Irish footballer

== See also ==
- Edward Brook (1895–1954), New Zealand cricket umpire
- Edward Brooke (disambiguation)
