= Edward Brooke (disambiguation) =

Edward Brooke (1919–2015) was an American politician.

Edward Brooke may also refer to:

- Edward Brooke, 6th Baron Cobham (c. 1415–1464), English peer
- Edward Brooke (fencer) (1916–2002), Canadian Olympic fencer
- Edward Brooke-Hitching, British author

== See also ==
- Edward Brook (1895–1954), New Zealand cricket umpire
- Edward Brooks (disambiguation)
