= Arthur Brooke =

Arthur Brooke may refer to:

- Arthur Brooke (poet) (died 1563), English poet
- Sir Arthur Brooke, 1st Baronet (1726–1785), Irish MP for Fermanagh, 1761–1783, and Maryborough
- Arthur de Capell Brooke (1791–1858), British baronet and travel writer
- Sir Arthur Brooke, 2nd Baronet (1797–1854), British MP for Fermanagh, 1840–1854
- Arthur Brooke (entrepreneur) (1845–1918), British founder of The Brooke Bond Tea Company
- Arthur Brooke (British Army officer) (1772–1843), Anglo-Irish lieutenant-general
- Arthur Brook (cricketer) (1844–1917), English cricketer
- Arthur Harold John Brook (1907–1985), English brewer

== See also ==
- Arthur Brooks (disambiguation)
- Arthur Brooke Faulkner (1779–1845), Irish physician and author
