= Stuart Brooks =

Stuart Brooks may refer to:

- Stuart Brooks (The Young and the Restless), character from The Young and the Restless
- Stuart M. Brooks (born 1936), American pulmonary doctor
