= Norwood Creason =

American politician

Member of the Missouri House of Representatives from the 36th district
- In office January 6, 1993 – January 4, 1995
- Preceded by: Vernon Thompson
- Succeeded by: Rodger Fitzwater

Member of the Missouri House of Representatives from the 28th district
- In office January 5, 1983 – January 6, 1993
- Preceded by: Phil Curls
- Succeeded by: Charles W. Shields

Member of the Missouri House of Representatives from the 16th district
- In office January 5, 1977 – January 5, 1983
- Preceded by: Vernon King
- Succeeded by: LeRoy Braungardt

Personal details
- Born: May 6, 1918
- Died: September 15, 2009 (aged 91) Braymer, Missouri
- Party: Democratic

Norwood Creason (May 6, 1918 – September 15, 2009) was an American politician who served in the Missouri House of Representatives from 1977 to 1995.

He died on September 15, 2009, in Braymer, Missouri at age 91.
