= Arthur Brooks =

Arthur Brooks may refer to:

- Arthur C. Brooks (born 1964), American social scientist
- Arthur Raymond Brooks (1895–1991), World War I flying ace
- Arthur Brooks (ice hockey) (1892–1987), Canadian ice hockey player
- Arthur Brooks (politician) (1936–2021), member of the Ohio House of Representatives
- Arthur Brooks (singer) (1933–2015), American soul singer and songwriter, in The Impressions
- Arthur Brooks (footballer) (1891–1976), English footballer

== See also ==
- Arthur Brooke (disambiguation)
