= Vernon Thompson =

American politician

Member of the Missouri House of Representatives from the 37 district (36th district until 1993)
- In office 1987–2000
- Succeeded by: Sharon Sanders Brooks

Personal details
- Born: April 14, 1943 Dayton, Texas, US
- Died: September 5, 2023 (aged 80) Kansas City, Missouri, US
- Resting place: XII Gates Memorial Gardens
- Party: Democratic
- Spouses: Patricia Jones (divorced); Vernita Valentine Thompson
- Children: 3

Military service
- Branch/service: US Army
- Criminal information
- Status: Released
- Convictions: 2× Fraud (2000)
- Penalty: 1 year + 1 day (reduced to 7 months + 15 days) in federal prison

Vernon Thompson was an American politician.

Thompson was a member of the Missouri House of Representatives from 1987 to 2000, when he was sentenced to one year and one day in federal prison on two counts of fraud, "for his role in stealing almost $305,000 from Kansas City and federally subsidized apartment projects." The sentence was later reduced to seven months and fifteen days. After he was released from prison, Thompson returned to the state legislature as an aide.
