= Jason Brooks =

Jason Brooks may refer to:

- Jason Brooks (illustrator) (born 1969), illustrator based in London
- Jason Brooks (actor) (born 1966), American actor
- Jason Brooks (painter) (born 1968), British painter and sculptor
