= Ray Brooks =

Ray Brooks may refer to:

- Ray Brooks (actor) (1939–2025), English television and film actor
- Arthur Raymond Brooks (1895–1991), World War I pilot, known as Ray
- Ramy Brooks (born 1968), American dog musher, known as Ray

== See also ==
- Ray Brooks School, Benoit, Mississippi, U.S.
