= Thomas Brooke =

Thomas Brooke may refer to:

== Politics ==
- Thomas Brooke (died 1418), MP for Somerset
- Thomas Brooke (died 1439), MP for Dorset and Somerset
- Thomas Brooke alias Cobham (1533–1578), MP for Rochester
- Thomas Brooke (died 1820), MP for Newton, Lancashire 1796–1807
- Thomas Brooke Jr. (1660–1730), acting governor of Maryland
- Thomas Brooke, 2nd Viscount Alanbrooke (1920–1972)
- Sir Thomas Brooke, 1st Baronet (1830–1908), director of the London and North Western Railway, deputy lieutenant, and justice of the peace
- Thomas Brooke Sr. (1632–1676), high sheriff, chief justice of Calvert Co., Maryland
- Thomas Brooke (Northamptonshire MP), English member of Barebone's Parliament 1653
- Thomas Brooke, 8th Baron Cobham (died 1529), Tudor baron in England

== Other ==
- Thomas Broke (fl. 1550), Thomas Broke or Brooke, translator
- Thomas Brooke (priest) (1684–1757), dean of Chester 1732–1758
- Tom Brooke (born 1978), English actor

== See also ==
- Tom Brook (born 1953), English journalist
- Thomas Brooks (disambiguation)
