= Brooke Adams =

Brooke Adams may refer to:

- Brooke Adams (actress) (born 1949), American actress
- Brooke Adams (born 1984), American professional model, dancer, and wrestler, who used the ring name Brooke Tessmacher
- Brooke Allison Adams (born 1986), birth name of Brooke Allison, American singer

== See also ==
- Adam Brooks (disambiguation)
- Brooks Adams (1848–1927), American historian and a critic of capitalism
