= Greg Brooks =

Greg Brooks may refer to:

- Greg Brooks (American football) (born 1980), former American football cornerback for the Cincinnati Bengals
- Greg Brooks, singer/dancer in Prince's Revolution
- Greg Brooks, publisher of Kansas City-based newspaper The Monitor

== See also ==
- Gregory Brooks, American poker player
