= Ernest Brooks =

Ernest Brooks or Brookes may refer to:

- Ernest Brooks (photographer) (1878–1957), British photographer
- Ernest Brookes (rugby league) (1884–1940), English rugby league footballer
- Ernest Walter Brooks (1863–1955), English ancient historian and scholar of Syriac
- Ernest H. Brooks Sr., American photographer, founder of the Brooks Institute
- Ernie Brooks (footballer) (1892–1975), English footballer
- Ernie Brooks, bassist with The Modern Lovers
