= Barry Brook =

Barry Brook may refer to:

- Barry Brook (scientist) (born 1974), Australian earth scientist
- Barry S. Brook (1918–1997), American musicologist

== See also ==
- Barry Brooks (disambiguation)
