= Adam Brooks =

Adam Brooks may refer to:

- Adam Brooks (politician) (born 1975), Australian politician
- Adam Brooks (filmmaker) (born 1956), Canadian film director, screenwriter and actor
- Adam Brooks (professional wrestler) (born 1991), Australian professional wrestler
- Adam Brooks (ice hockey) (born 1996), 4th round selection in 2016 by the Toronto Maple Leafs
- Adam Brooks (footballer) (born 2004), Scottish footballer
- Adam Brooks (political commentator), English political commentator on GB News

== See also ==
- Adam Brook, American surgeon
- Brooks (surname)
- Brooke Adams (disambiguation)
