= Uniacke Square =

Neighbourhood in Halifax, Nova Scotia

Coordinates: 44°39′29.42″N 63°35′19.84″W

Uniacke Square is a public housing residential area in the north central area of Halifax, Nova Scotia. It is flanked in the northeast by Brunswick Street and to the southwest by Gottingen Street.

== History ==
Uniacke Square was opened on May 7, 1966 as a 250-unit housing project. A library sits to the southeast, on Gottingen St., and a community centre, the George Dixon Centre, to the northwest. It was built to house the displaced population of Africville whose roots go back to refugees of the War of 1812, the Underground Railroad and American Civil War period. Homes in Africville were torn down as part of an urban renewal scheme between 1964 and 1967. Today, though some black residents of Uniacke Square are descendants of Africville, others are transplants from other Black Nova Scotian settlements who moved to the area.

By the late 1980s, the housing units at Uniacke Square were reported to be in good structural condition but in need of interior renewal. From 1988 to 1990, the Canada Mortgage and Housing Corporation renovated the housing estate at a cost of around $8.5 million. In addition to renewal of the housing interiors, some areas of exterior car parking were replaced with green spaces.

The neighbourhood around the Square is home to a number of front-line service agencies. There were four such agencies in the Gottingen Street area when Uniacke Square opened; today there are 20, including Adsum House for homeless and abused women and their families, Turning Point for homeless men and Hope Cottage, which provides meals to those who need them.

== Present day ==
Today, two-thirds of the residents of the Square are women, and two-thirds are under 25. The neighbourhood is highly diverse with a high concentration of African Canadians, Arab Canadians, and Indigenous people; the percent of African Canadians once accounted for the majority of the population.

The areas of Gottingen Street, Creighton Street, and Maynard Street surrounding the Square was traditionally home to a large middle-class African-Canadian population. Many of them were small business owners, or working professionals. However, uncontrolled gentrification of the North End has changed the area's demographics considerably.

Uniacke Square supports a satellite police station, a parent resource centre, a small church and an office of the Salvation Army. Uniacke Square also has a community centre, The George Dixon Centre, named after the first Canadian boxing champion George Dixon, Centreline Studio a community based recording Studio and also home of the Uniacke Centre for Community Development

The unemployment rate in Uniacke Square is 26.4%.

== Demographics ==
Ethnic group	Population 2006	% 2006	Population 2016	% 2016	Population 2021	% 2021
Black	490	61%	350	44%	275	32%
White	212	26.5%	327	41%	351	41%
First Nations	60	7.5%	70	9%	65	7.5%
Arab	0	0%	20	3%	135	15.5%
Other ethnicity	35	5%	20	3%	30	3.5%
Total Population	799	100%	797	100%	856	100%

As of 2016, 91.5% of the population speak English as their first language, 3% speak Urdu, 1.5% speak Spanish, 1.5% speak Vietnamese and 1.5% speak French.

The area of Uniacke Square is Dissemination Areas 12090344, and 12090345. This area covers 9 ha (22 acres) and has a population of 856 as of 2021.

The unemployment rate in Uniacke Square is 26.4%.

== Notable people ==
- Aquakultre, Soul and R&B artist
- Jade Brooks, author and activist
- JRDN, R&B recording artist
- Lindell Wigginton, NBA basketball player
