= Geraldine Brooks =

Geraldine Brooks may refer to:

- Geraldine Brooks (actress) (1925–1977), American stage, television and film performer
- Geraldine Brooks (writer) (born 1955), Australian journalist and novelist

== See also ==
- Brooks (surname)
