= Richard Brooke =

Richard Brooke may refer to:

- Richard Brooke (Norton) (died 1569), bought the manor of Norton, near Runcorn, Cheshire
- Richard Brooke (physician) (1716–1783), American physician
- Richard Brooke (antiquary) (1791–1861), English antiquary
- Richard Brooke (priest) (1840–1926), Archdeacon of Cape Town from 1905 until 1926
- Richard Brooke (cricketer) (1909–1973), English cricketer and clergyman
- Richard Kendall Brooke (1930–1996), South African ornithologist
- Richard Brooke (explorer) (1927–2020), British explorer and Royal Naval surveyor
- Richard Broke (judge) (died 1529), also written Richard Brooke, baron of the Exchequer
- Sir Richard Brooke (multiple) - see Brooke baronets

== See also ==
- Richard Broke (disambiguation)
- Richard Brook (disambiguation)
- Richard Brooks (disambiguation)
