= Frank Brooks =

Frank Brooks may refer to:

- Frank Brooks (baseball) (born 1978), Major League Baseball player
- Frank Brooks (sportsman) (1884–1952), Southern Rhodesian cricketer, rugby union player and tennis player
- Frank Leonard Brooks (1911–2011), Canadian artist
- Frank P. Brooks (1850–?), member of the Mississippi House of Representatives

== See also ==
- Franklin E. Brooks (1860–1916), U.S. Representative from Colorado
