= Alfred Brooks =

Alfred Brooks may refer to:

- Alfred Brooks (cricketer) (1846–1911), English cricketer
- Alfred Brooks (dancer) (1916–2005), American modern dancer, choreographer, musician
- Alfred Brooks, English businessman, co-founder of Justerini & Brooks
- Alfred Brooks, title character of Robert Lipsyte's novel, The Contender
- Alfred Hulse Brooks (1871–1924), American geologist
- Alfred Johnson Brooks (1890–1967), Canadian barrister, educator, and politician from New Brunswick
- Alfred Leroy Brooks (1858–1927), American physician and politician from Iowa

== See also ==
- Alfred Deakin Brookes (1920–2005), Australian spy
