= Richard Brook =

Richard Brook may refer to:

- Richard Brook (chief executive), chief executive of the UK charity Sense-National Deafblind and Rubella Association
- Richard Brook (bishop) (1880–1969), Anglican bishop
- Professor Moriarty

== See also ==
- Richard Brooke (disambiguation)
- Richard Brooks (disambiguation)
