= Joshua Brookes (disambiguation) =

Joshua Brookes (1761–1833) was a British anatomist.

Joshua Brookes may also refer to:

- Joshua Brookes (divine) (1754–1821), Anglican divine and English eccentric
- Josh Brookes (born 1983), Australian motorcycle road racer

== See also ==
- Joshua Brooks (disambiguation)
