= Richard Brooks (disambiguation) =

Richard Brooks (1912–1992) was an American screenwriter, film director and novelist.

Richard Brooks also may refer to:

== Entertainment ==
- Richard E. Brooks (1865–1919), American sculptor
- Richard Brooks (singer) (1940–2023), American soul singer
- Richard Brooks (actor) (born 1962), American actor, singer and director
- Dick Brooks (magician), American magician

== Sports ==
- Richard Brooks (cricketer) (1863–1927), English cricketer
- Rich Brooks (born 1941), American football coach
- Dick Brooks (1942–2006), NASCAR driver
- Dickie Brooks (born 1943), English cricketer

== Other ==
- Richard Brooks (captain) (1765–1833), ship's captain and early Australian settler
- Richard Brooks (journalist) (born 1965), English investigative journalist and author
- Richard Brooks (Scottish politician) (born 1967), Scottish politician

== See also ==
- Ricard Brooks (1894–1954), American muralist and painter
- Richard Brookes (fl. 1721–1763), English physician and author
- Richard Brookes (footballer) (fl. 1908–1920), English footballer
- Rick Brookes (born 1948), British satirical cartoonist
- Richard Brook (disambiguation)
- Richard Brooke (disambiguation)
- Brooks (surname)
