= Simon Brooke =

Simon Brook, Brooke or Broke may refer to:

== Film and television ==
- Simon Brook (actor) in Twisted (1996 film)
- Simon Brook (director), British director, son of Peter Brook
- Simon Brooke (actor) in Into the Woods (Desperate Housewives)

== Others ==
- Simon Broke (fl. 1393–1406), MP for Gloucester
- Simon Brooke (rugby), player for Alcobendas Rugby
- Simon Brook (died 1968), Australian child possibly murdered by Derek Percy

== See also ==
- Simon Brooks (disambiguation)
