= Boruch =

Boruch is a given name. Notable people with the name include:

- Boruch Ber Leibowitz, main student of Rabbi Chaim Brisker famed for his Talmudic lectures
- Boruch Greenfeld, (1872–1956), rabbi and Torah scholar
- Boruch Israel Dyner (1903–1979), Belgian–Israeli chess master
- Boruch of Medzhybizh (1753–1811), the first major "rebbe" of the Hasidic movement to hold court in Mezhbizh and Beis Medrash
- Boruch Perlowitz, Orthodox Jewish filmmaker
- Marianne Boruch (born 1950), American poet
