= Reactive airway disease =

- Specialty: Pulmonology

Reactive airway disease (RAD) is an informal label that physicians apply to patients with symptoms similar to those of asthma. An exact definition of the condition does not exist. Individuals who are typically labeled as having RAD generally have a history of wheezing, coughing, dyspnea, and production of sputum that may or may not be caused by asthma. Symptoms may also include, but are not limited to, coughing, shortness of breath, excess mucus in the bronchial tube, swollen mucous membrane in the bronchial tube, and/or hypersensitive bronchial tubes. Physicians most commonly label patients with RAD when they are hesitant about formally diagnosing a patient with asthma, which is most prevalent in the pediatric setting. While some physicians may use RAD and asthma synonymously, there is controversy over this usage.

More generally, there is controversy over the use of RAD as a label in the healthcare setting, largely due to the ambiguous definition that the term has. Since RAD is not recognized as a real clinical diagnosis, its meaning is highly inconsistent and may cause confusion and misdiagnosis within the medical community. There are also concerns with overtreatment and undertreatment with RAD amongst physicians, since there is little formality with the label. Other problems that healthcare workers have with the use of the RAD label include its exclusion in the International Statistical Classification of Diseases and Related Health Problems, which can lead to billing issues in hospitals and other health care facilities, and the creation of a fabricated sense of security when using it as a diagnosis.

RAD can be confused with reactive airways dysfunction syndrome, an asthma-like disorder that results from high exposure to vapors, fumes, and/or smoke. Unlike RAD, reactive airways dysfunction syndrome is recognized by multiple societies as a real clinical syndrome, including the American Thoracic Society and the American College of Chest Physicians.

== Terminology ==
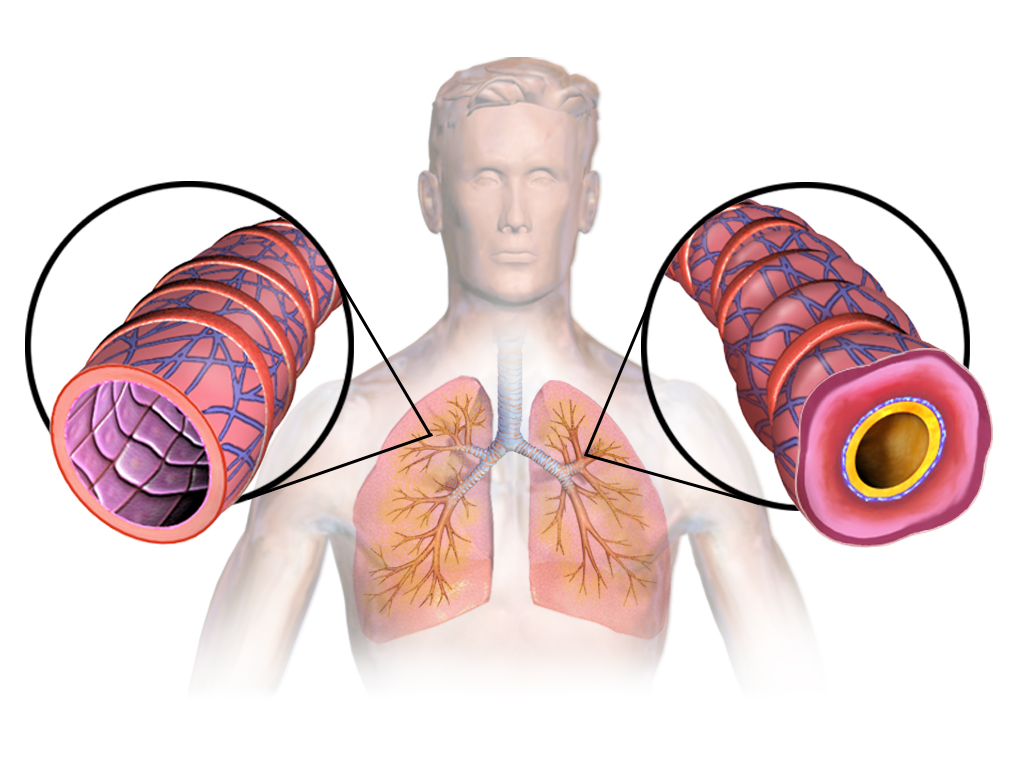
It is common to see RAD incorrectly used as a synonym for asthma.

The term reactive airway disease originally began to appear in medical literature in the 1980s in reference to asthmatic patients with hyperactive airways, which is a common feature of asthma. This feature is characterized by increased bronchoconstriction reactions in response to stimuli that should not elicit so strong of response. These stimuli can include methacholine, histamine, and distilled water. However, while this was how the term initially was introduced, RAD soon began to be used interchangeably with the term asthma itself, which has led to the current controversy over its place in medical diagnoses.

More commonly, RAD is now mostly used by physicians when they are hesitant to diagnose a patient with asthma. This is most prominent in pediatric settings for a variety of reasons. While infants tend to wheeze more often than adults, only one-third of them eventually go on to actually have asthma. Asthma and viral bronchiolitis can also be nearly identical to each other when presented in very young children, since they both consist of wheezing, coughing, and nasal congestion. In addition, typical tests used to accurately diagnose children with asthma, such as the bronchial challenge test, are not considered to be accurate for children under the age of five. This can be due to failure of very young children to cooperate. Diagnosing a child with asthma also carries a certain negative connotation, causing hesitancy from some physicians to do so. All of these factors lead physicians to label young children with RAD instead of asthma, since the disease is often only suspected and unable to be confirmed with pediatric patients. While there is little known about treatment options for childhood RAD individuals, a meta-analysis from 2018 found that macrolide antibiotics, which when used as a therapy option, were associated with reduced recurrent wheezing periods in reactive airway disease labeled children, suggesting that this medication could provide some relief for children with RAD.

Physicians will generally label an adult with RAD if they have no prior diagnosis or history of asthma while exhibiting symptoms of wheezing, production of sputum, and/or the use of an inhaler. Symptoms may also include, but are not limited to, coughing, shortness of breath, excess mucus in the bronchial tube, swollen mucous membrane in the bronchial tube, and/or hypersensitive bronchial tubes. In order to make a formal asthma diagnosis in adult patients, there is requirement to have documentation of either airway hyperreactivity or some sort of reversible airway obstruction. If none of these symptoms are present in an adult patients' medical history or documentation, the physician may label the patient with RAD instead of asthma in order to still indicate there is an airway issue without formal diagnosis.

== Reactive airways dysfunction syndrome ==
While the acronyms are similar, reactive airway disease (RAD) and reactive airways dysfunction syndrome (RADS) are not the same.

Reactive airways dysfunction syndrome was first identified by Stuart M. Brooks and colleagues in 1985 as an asthma-like syndrome developing after a single exposure to high levels of an irritating vapor, fume, or smoke. It can manifest in adults with exposure to high levels of chlorine, ammonia, acetic acid, or sulphur dioxide, creating symptoms like asthma. These symptoms can vary from mild to fatal and can even create long-term airway damage, depending on the amount of exposure and the concentration of chlorine. Patients that have been diagnosed with RADS will likely have methacholine airway hyperreactivity, yet other tests that also measure pulmonary functions may appear normal. Some experts classify RADS as occupational asthma. Those with exposure to highly irritating substances should receive treatment to mitigate harmful effects. Treatment for RADS is similar to treatment for other disorders that result from acute inhalation. Preexisting allergies can be a risk factor for developing RADS.

The main difference between RAD and RADS is that RADS can occur after just one exposure to the inhalants and without any prior sensitization. In addition, although the symptoms of RADS are very similar to those of asthma, they may be resolved. While some physicians argue that RADS is also not a real clinical syndrome, it is more commonly recognized in legitimate associations than RAD. These associations include the American Thoracic Society and the American College of Chest Physicians.

== Controversy over use ==
There remains controversy over the use of RAD as an unofficial diagnosis. With its use not only being limited to clinical lexicon, but also transitioning to clinical literature now, more physicians are now increasingly disapproving its use in the healthcare setting.

One of the largest problems with the using RAD as a diagnostic label lies in the ambiguity of its meaning, as RAD has no true clinical definition. It is either not listed or redirects to "asthma" in all major medical journals and websites. It is also not recognized by the American Academy of Pediatrics; the American Thoracic Society; or the National Heart Lung and Blood Institute. Its use may result in undertreatment, as treatments for asthma, chronic bronchitis, emphysema, or pneumonia may not be prescribed under a label of reactive airway disease. Alternatively, overtreatment may occur, as patients can be prescribed inhaled beta-agonists or inhaled corticosteroids, which are medications used for asthma. If an individual with RAD does not have asthma, there is no evidence these treatments are beneficial. As a result of its ambiguous place in the medical field, the symptoms used to characterize it are often inconsistent and can lead to confusion in a healthcare setting. This is a troubling issue for many physicians, as care can be made more complicated; many patients labeled with RAD do not ultimately have asthma, and most RAD patients have never formally had their airway reactivity measured.

In addition to the inconsistencies of its labeling, there is no billing designation for RAD in the International Statistical Classification of Diseases and Related Health Problems, or the ICD, which can lead to problems for healthcare facilities. Searches in the ICD point to content relating to asthma. Some medical professionals argue that using RAD as a diagnosis will only complicate research on asthma in the context of clinical research and epidemiology. The ability to label a patient with RAD may it give physicians a fabricated sense of security that they have made a diagnosis, when no real recognizable diagnosis has been made.

== See also ==
- Bronchiolitis
