= Richard Broke =

Richard Broke may refer to:

- Sir Richard Broke (judge) (died 1529), English judge, MP for City of London
- Richard Broke (14th century MP), MP for Rochester in 1395

== See also ==
- R. B. Freeman (Richard Broke Freeman, 1915–1986), British zoologist
- Richard Brooke (disambiguation)
