= Derreck Brooks =

American basketball player (born 1994)

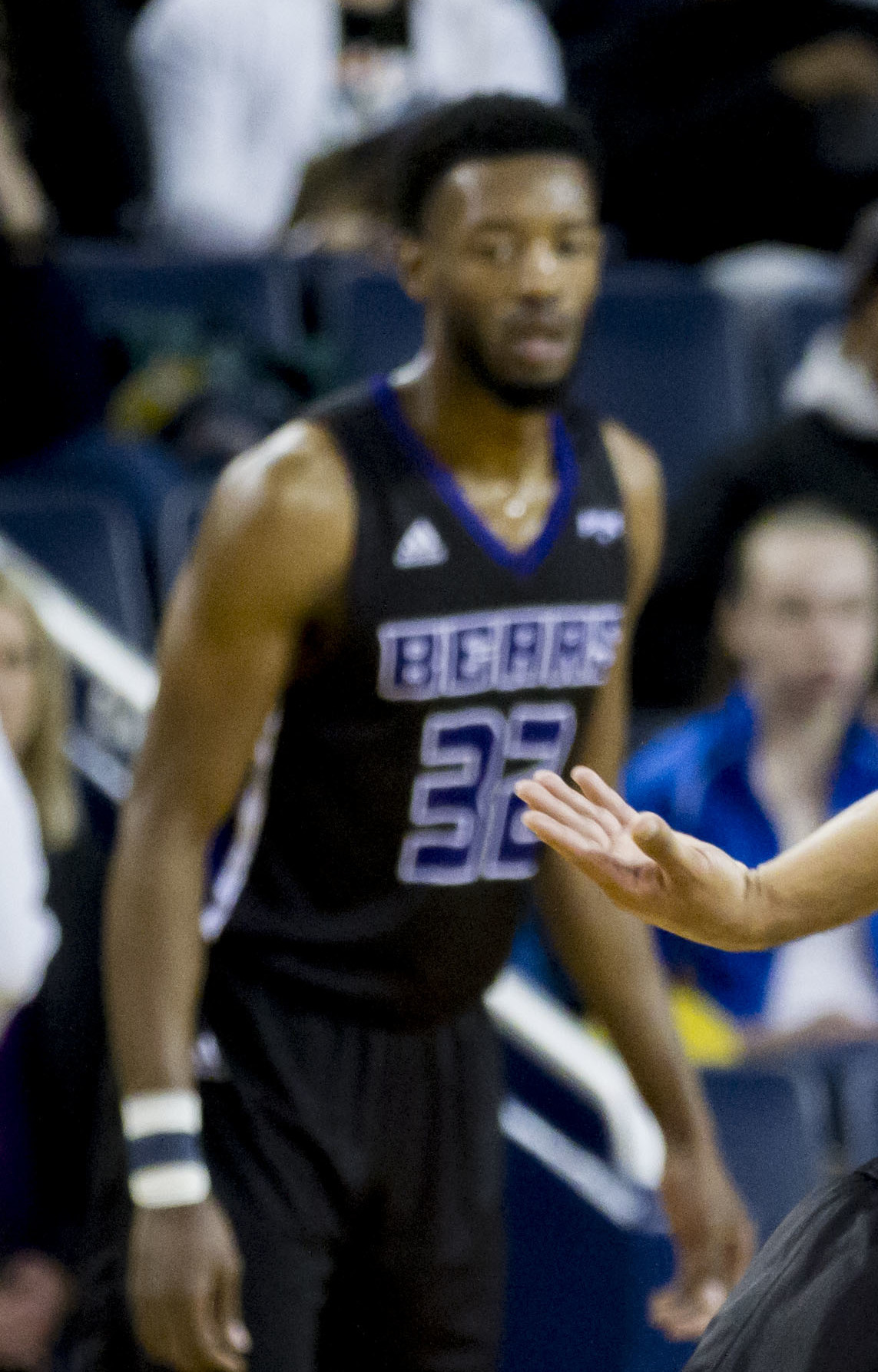

No. 32 – Phoenix Hagen
- Position: Small forward
- League: ProA

Personal information
- Born: May 14, 1994 (age 31) Portland, Oregon, U.S.
- Listed height: 6 ft 4 in (1.93 m)

Career information
- High school: Desert Ridge (Mesa, Arizona)
- College: Phoenix College (2012–2014); Central Arkansas (2015–2017)
- NBA draft: 2017: undrafted
- Playing career: 2017–present

Career history
- 2017–present: Phoenix Hagen

Derreck Brooks (born May 14, 1994) is an American professional basketball player who currently plays for the Phoenix Hagen club of the German ProA league.
