= Randy Brooks =

Randy Brooks may refer to:

- Randy Brooks (actor) (born 1950), American television and film actor
- Randy Brooks (biologist) (born 1955), American marine biologist
- Randy Brooks (musician) (1919–1967), American jazz trumpeter and bandleader
- Randy Brooks, American musician and composer of the 1977 Christmas novelty song "Grandma Got Run Over by a Reindeer"
