= Frederick Brooks (disambiguation) =

Fred Brooks (1931–2022) was an American software engineer and computer scientist.

Frederick, Freddie, or Fred Brooks may also refer to:

- Fred Brooks (footballer) (1908–1996), Australian rules footballer
- Fred Brooks or Fred Hellerman (1927–2016), American songwriter
- Freddie Brooks (musician) (born 1962), American singer-songwriter
- Freddie Brooks (sportsman) (1883–1947), Rhodesian cricketer and rugby union international
- Frederick Tom Brooks (1882–1952), English botanist

== See also ==
- Freddy Brooks (born 1969), Cuban volleyball player
- Frederic Brooks Dugdale (1877–1902), English recipient of the Victoria Cross
