= Simon Brooks (disambiguation) =

Simon Brooks (born 1971) is a Welsh editor.

Simon Brooks may also refer to:

- Simon Brooks, fictional character in The Palace
- Simon Brooks, one of the Candidates of the 2007 New South Wales state election

== See also ==
- Simon Brook (disambiguation)
