= Sheila Brooks =

Journalist and entrepreneur

Sheila Brooks is an American journalist and entrepreneur. She is an advocate for minority and women's issues and small businesses. Brooks is the founder, president and CEO of the Washington, DC–based advertising and marketing communications agency SRB Communications, which specializes in multicultural advertising, public relations, media relations, and broadcast production.

Brooks focuses her special interest in entrepreneurial education and minority business issues. In 2014, she was the Entrepreneur in Residence at the School of Communications at Howard University where she provided consulting services in strategy, branding and media outreach for the entrepreneurial incubator.

== Education ==
Brooks received a Bachelor of Arts degree in communications with a major in broadcast journalism from the University of Washington in 1978. She has a Master of Arts degree in political science from Howard University. In 2015, she earned a PhD in communication, culture, and media studies from Howard University. Brooks is an alumna of the Greater Leadership Washington program and the Minority Business Executive Programs at Northwestern University's Kellogg School of Business and Dartmouth College’s Amos Tuck School of Business.

== Career ==
Brooks began her career as a news director, reporter, anchor, and documentary producer at CBS, NBC, PBS and Fox owned-and operated and affiliate TV stations across the United States. She founded SRB Communications in 1990. Her career currently spans nearly 40 years in the media industry. Brooks has won two Emmy Awards and an NAACP Image Award for her work.

== Awards ==
In 2005, Brooks received the Enterprising Women of the Year Award from Enterprising Women magazine, honoring women business owners for their leadership and community involvement. In 2008, Brooks was named one of the Top 100 Minority Business Enterprises by the Center for Business Inclusion and Diversity.
