= Benjamin Brooks =

Benjamin or Ben Brooks may refer to:

- Benjamin Brooks (politician) (born 1950), member of the Maryland Senate
- Benjamin Brooks (businessman), see Clay Street Hill Railroad
- Benjamin Brooks (cyclist) in 2000 Tour de Langkawi
- Benjamin Brooks, character in Absolution
- Ben Brooks (politician) (born 1958), Republican member of the Alabama Senate
- Ben Brooks (novelist) (born 1992), English author

== See also ==
- Benjamin Brook (1776–1848), English nonconformist minister and religious historian
