= Vic Brooks =

English cricketer

Personal information
- Full name: Victor Charles George Brooks
- Born: 26 June 1948 (age 78); East Ham, Essex, England
- Batting: Left-handed
- Role: Occasional wicket-keeper

Domestic team information
- Years: Team
- 1969–1971: Essex

Career statistics
Competition	First-class	List A
Matches	3	3
Runs scored	53	6
Batting average	10.60	2.00
100s/50s	–/–	–/–
Top score	22	6
Balls bowled	–	–
Wickets	–	–
Bowling average	–	–
5 wickets in innings	–	–
10 wickets in match	–	–
Best bowling	–	–
Catches/stumpings	1/–	1/–
- Source: Cricinfo, 24 February 2012

Victor Charles George Brooks (born 29 June 1948) is a former English cricketer. Brooks is a left-handed batsman who occasionally fielded as a wicket-keeper. He was born at East Ham, Essex.

Brooks made his debut for Essex in a List A match against Sussex in the 1969 Player's County League, with him making a further appearance in that season's competition against Surrey. The following season he made his first-class debut against the touring Jamaicans. In 1971 Brooks made two further first-class appearances, against Warwickshire and Kent, as well as making a further List A appearance against Hampshire in the John Player League. In first-class cricket, Brooks scored 53 runs at an average of 10.60, with a highest score of 22. In List A cricket, he scored 6 runs at an average of 2.00, with a highest score of 6.
