= Kate Brooks (astronomer) =

Australian astronomer

- Education: University of New South Wales
- Scientific career
- Fields: Astronomy
- Workplaces: Australia National Telescope Facility
- Thesis: An investigation of the Carina Nebula

Kate Jane Brooks is an astronomer at the CSIRO Australia Telescope National Facility, where she works as a research scientist. With over 40 refereed publications to her name, she has developed a strong reputation in the field of galactic star-forming regions.

Brooks is a strong supporter of young women scientists and early career researchers, and as a result she is a member of the inaugural steering committee for the Societies Chapter on Women in Astronomy.

== Education ==
Brooks was awarded her PhD in 2000 for studies on the Carina Nebula.

== Career ==
Between 1998 and 2003 she was based at the European Southern Observatory, University of Chile. Between 2004 and 2007 she was a CSIRO Boulton Fellow. She was vice-president of the Astronomical Society of Australia from 2009 to 2010 and president from 2011 to 2012. In 2011 she was executive officer for the CSIRO telescope Australian Square Kilometre Array Pathfinder.

From 2011 to 2013 she was the president of the council for the Astronomical Society of Australia. She has also been deputy head of operations at the Australia Telescope National Facility and an honorary associate of the School of Physics at the University of Sydney, an editorial board member of the Publications of the Astronomical Society of Australia.
