= Chandler McCuskey Brooks =

American physiologist

- Born: December 18, 1905; West Virginia
- Died: November 29, 1989 (aged 83)
- Education: Oberlin College, Princeton University
- Known for: Relationships between the central nervous and endocrine systems
- Scientific career
- Fields: Physiology
- Institutions: Johns Hopkins University, Long Island College Hospital
- Doctoral advisor: Philip Bard

Dr. Chandler McCuskey Brooks (December 18, 1905 – November 29, 1989) was an American physiologist notable for his research on the relationships between the central nervous and endocrine systems. He was also known for his studies of the electrophysiology of the heart. Brooks was a member of the National Academy of Sciences. He also headed the physiology and pharmacology departments of the Long Island College of Medicine and a Guggenheim fellow (Medicine & Health, 1945).

He was a member of the National Academy of Sciences.

== Early life ==
Brooks was born in West Virginia. After his mother's death the family moved to Massachusetts where he received, in his own account, a mediocre education. That changed when he attended Oberlin College in Ohio and with subsequent graduate study at Princeton University where he received a Ph.D. in 1931 under Philip Bard.

== Career ==
He followed Bard to Johns Hopkins University in 1933. In 1948 he became professor and chairman of the department of Physiology and Pharmacology at the Long Island College Hospital School of Medicine in Brooklyn.

Brooks was among the first group of pioneering neuroendocrinologists. In cardiac physiology, Brooks' studies were important in establishing principles that were important in the development of implanted pacemakers. His major works included the study of the autonomic nervous system as well as (in collaboration with John Eccles) the role of Golgi cell in the spinal cord.

== Retirement ==
He retired in 1972, taking up volunteer philanthropic activities. After the death of his wife of fifty years, Brooks became in 1986 a fellow in the Center for Theological Inquiry in Princeton and pursued theological studies. He died in 1989.
