= Michael Brooks =

Michael or Mike Brooks may refer to:

== Arts and entertainment ==
- Michael Brooks (historian and journalist) (born 1964), American historian and investigative journalist
- Michael Brooks (music historian) (1935–2020), American music historian and record producer
- Michael Brooks (political commentator) (1983–2020), American writer, host of The Michael Brooks Show and The Majority Report with Sam Seder
- Michael Brooks (science writer) (born 1970), English science writer and commentator
- Mike Brooks (singer) (born 1953), Jamaican reggae singer active since the early 1970s
- Mike Brooks (journalist) (1955–2021), American television news correspondent

== Sports ==
- Michael Brooks (basketball) (1958–2016), American basketball player
- Michael Brooks (linebacker) (born 1964), American football linebacker
- Michael Brooks (defensive back) (born 1967), American football safety
- Mic'hael Brooks (born 1991), American football defensive tackle

== Others ==
- Mike J. Brooks, University of Adelaide vice-chancellor (21st and 23rd office-holder)
- Michael Brooks-Jimenez (born 1969/70), American politician
- Mike Brooks, brother of professional wrestler CM Punk

== See also ==
- Michael Brook (born 1951), Canadian guitarist
- Michael A. Brookes (born 1965), U.S. Navy officer
- Mike Cannon-Brookes (born 1979), Australian entrepreneur
