= Abraham Brooks =

English cricketer

Abraham Worthington Brooks (29 May 1852 – 7 May 1925) was an English cricketer. He was a wicket-keeper who played for Lancashire. He was born in Darcy Lever, Bolton, Lancashire and died in Breightmet Fold, also in Bolton.

Brooks played one first-class match for Lancashire during the 1877 season, against Yorkshire. In the one inning in which he batted, he scored six runs from the tailend, while he took two catches from behind the stumps.
