= Edward Pennell Brooks =

American academic administrator

Edward Pennell Brooks (1896–1991), aka E.P. Brooks and Penn Brooks, was the founding Dean (from 1951 to 1959) of the MIT Sloan School of Management.

Prior to his tenure, the Sloan School was known as the MIT Department of Business and Engineering Administration. A 1950 gift from MIT alumnus and GM Chairman Alfred P. Sloan turned the department into the School of Industrial Management, which opened its doors in 1952 with Brooks as its first dean. In 1964 the School was renamed the Alfred P. Sloan School of Management in its founder's honor.

Brooks received his S.B. from the Massachusetts Institute of Technology in 1917. He was a member of the first class to receive the degree in Course XV: Engineering Administration.
