= Todd E. Creason =

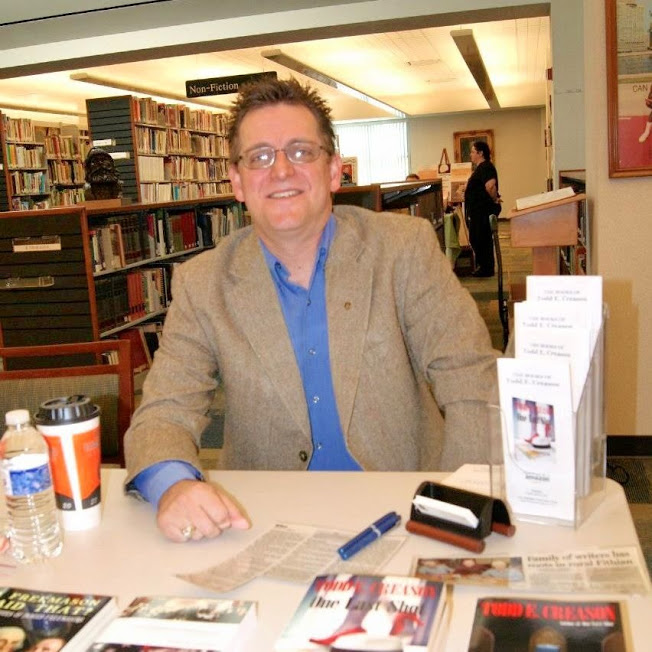
Todd E. Creason

Todd E. Creason (born May 26, 1967) is an American author of both fiction and non-fiction, who writes primarily on the topic of Freemasonry. An active Freemason, Creason is best known as the author of the Famous American Freemasons series.

== Career ==
As a Freemason, he is the Past Master of Ogden Lodge No. 754 (IL) Ancient Free & Accepted Masons He is a 33° Scottish Rite Mason in the Valley of Danville (IL). He belongs to several Masonic research organizations, including the Missouri Lodge of Research, the Philalethes Society, and the Scottish Rite Research Society. He serves as an officer in the Illinois Lodge of Research.

Shortly after becoming a Master Mason, he began researching and writing the Famous American Freemasons series, which is a collection of short profiles of famous American Freemasons and their impact on American history, culture, and leadership throughout American history. The first book in the series was released in 2007, and the second in 2009. He also published a collection of quotes in 2009 A Freemason Said That? Great Quotes of Famous Freemasons which was a companion of the series.

Creason published his novels One Last Shot in 2010, A Shot After Midnight in 2012, and Shot To Hell in 2014..

In 2012, Creason wrote and produced a dramatic video Freemasons: Friends or Foes which helped dispel myths about Freemasonry and introduced viewers to many of the famous American Freemasons Creason had featured in his Famous American Freemasons series.

He is also the founder and a regular contributor to the popular Midnight Freemasons blog.

Creason retired from the University of Illinois at Urbana-Champaign in 2024 as the Senior Business Manager at the Office of Technology Management. He was ordained by the American Baptist Church in 2024, and serves as Senior Pastor of Muncie Baptist Church in Muncie, Illinois.

== Works ==
- Famous American Freemasons: Volume I, 2007. ISBN 978-1435703452
- Famous American Freemasons: Volume II, 2009. ISBN 978-0557070886
- A Freemason Said That? Great Quotes of Famous Freemasons, 2009. ISBN 978-0557096343
- One Last Shot, (A Novel) 2010. ISBN 978-0983115601
- A Shot After Midnight, (A Novel) 2012. ISBN 978-0983115618
- Shot To Hell, (A Novel) 2014. ISBN 978-0983115625

== Video productions ==
- Freemasons: Friends or Foes? (2012)
