= Arthur Brook (cricketer) =

English cricketer

Personal information
- Full name: Arthur John Brook
- Born: 18 September 1844; Bexhill-on-Sea, Sussex, England
- Died: 19 December 1917 (aged 73); Sidley, Sussex, England
- Batting: Unknown

Domestic team information
- Years: Team
- 1873: Sussex

Career statistics
Competition	First-class
Matches	1
Runs scored	10
Batting average	10.00
100s/50s	–/–
Top score	10
Balls bowled	–
Wickets	–
Bowling average	–
5 wickets in innings	–
10 wickets in match	–
Best bowling	–
Catches/stumpings	–/–
- Source: Cricinfo, 7 January 2012

Arthur John Brook (18 September 1844 – 19 December 1917) was an English cricketer. Brook's batting style is unknown. He was born at Bexhill-on-Sea, Sussex.

Brook made a single first-class appearance for Sussex against Kent at Ashford Road, Eastbourne in 1873. He batted once in the match, in Sussex's first-innings of 302 all out, in which he scored 10 runs before being dismissed by William Coppinger. Sussex won the match by an innings and 104 runs.

He died at Sidley, Sussex on 19 December 1917.
