= John J. Brooks =

American lawman

- Born: Texas, U.S.
- Occupation: Lawman

John J. Brooks was an American lawman. He served as lieutenant in the service of the Arizona Rangers from 1904 to 1905.

== Biography ==
Brooks was born in Texas. He became an Arizona Ranger after being leaving in the Texas Ranger Division service in 1903, where he served as a private. In Naco, Brooks killed an African American man during an altercation. The man, who had previously been a corral boss at the camp, allegedly threatened two girls. Brooks killed him, but later acquitted. He was then advanced to the rank of lieutenant in April 1904 of the Arizona Rangers.

In the same year, Brooks apprehended and killed a man using the fake name Charles Douglas at a silica quarry. He also apprehended a prisoner at a jail in the Sonoran Desert in Arizona. In 1905, Brooks had taken the place as "Special Officer" of the El Tigre mine.

Brooks had a ranch with Doc Moore for which it was located in Montezuma, Arizona, in which he and his family had moved to Douglas, Arizona for safety after hearing about Mexicans, outlaws and Yaquis. In 1907, he was falsely murdered by Mexican outlaws in Chihuahua, Arizona for which it had stated that Brooks was still alive in Naco, Arizona. Harry C. Wheeler who served as the third captain of the Arizona Rangers had heard about the false murder.
