= Frank P. Brooks =

American state legislator (born 1850)

Frank P. Brooks (September 22, 1850 – ?) was an American farmer and state legislator in Mississippi. He represented Sharkey County in the Mississippi House of Representatives from 1886 to 1888.

Brooks was born in Madison County, Mississippi He went to school in Vicksburg, Mississippi.

He was elected and re-elected to the Board of Supervisors but was asked to resign during his second term by a committee of whites. This occurred during a period of "disturbances" in the area of Deer Creek during which at least eight African Americans were killed.
