= Audrey Brooks =

British botanist

- Born: 3 October 1933; Kent
- Died: 18 January 2018 (aged 84)

Academic background
- Education: University of Aberystwyth

Academic work
- Discipline: Botany
- Notable works: Garden Pests and Diseases (Royal Horticultural Society's Encyclopaedia of Practical Gardening)

Audrey Vera Brooks (1933–2018) was a British botanist, plant pathologist, and author. She is particularly known for her work for the Royal Horticultural Society where she was the first woman to hold a senior position.

== Career ==
Brooks was born in Kent in 1933. Brooks studied agricultural botany at the University of Aberystwyth. In 1957 Brooks started work as an assistant plant pathologist for the Royal Horticultural Society at RHS Garden, Wisley. In 1964 she was promoted to plant pathologist and campaigned for a salary commensurate with her male colleagues. Brooks continued to work for the Royal Horticultural Society, eventually becoming the senior plant pathologist and the Education Officer overseeing Royal Horticultural Society examinations.

While at the Royal Horticultural Society, Brooks edited the RHS Gardens Club Journal and produced several books on plant disease and disorders which remain set texts for RHS qualifications.

Brooks retired from the Royal Horticultural Society in 1993.

== Honours ==
- Royal Horticultural Society Associate of Honour (1994)

== Publications ==
- with Andrew Halstead Garden Pests and Diseases (Royal Horticultural Society's Encyclopaedia of Practical Gardening)
- Vegetable Pests, Diseases and Disorders (Wisley) (Royal Horticultural Society 1977)
- with Keith M Harris and Andrew Halstead Fruit pests, Diseases and Disorders (Royal Horticultural Society 1976)
