= Berry Boswell Brooks =

American businessman and philanthropist

- Born: February 2, 1902; Senatobia, Mississippi, United States
- Died: January 21, 1976 (aged 73); Memphis, Tennessee, United States
- Occupation: Cotton broker
- Known for: Big-game hunting, donations to Memphis City Museum

Berry Boswell Brooks (February 2, 1902 – January 21, 1976) was an American businessman, philanthropist and big-game hunter. Brooks established his own cotton-brokering firm and maintained a large estate in Memphis, Tennessee. He made a number of hunting expeditions to Africa and Asia and won several hunting awards. He donated many of his hunting trophies to the Memphis City Museum, which named a hall of African animals after him.

== Early life and business career ==
Berry Boswell Brooks was born on February 2, 1902, at Senatobia, Mississippi. His parents were Lena Jane Brooks and Berry Boswell Brooks, the local sheriff. He moved with his family to Memphis, Tennessee around 1914 and later attended Washington and Lee University in Virginia. In 1922 Brooks commenced a career in the cotton industry, securing a position as a clerk on a salary of $25 per month. In 1923 he joined the Farnsworth-Smithwick Company, a Memphis-based cotton broker, and set up his own firm, the Berry B. Brooks Cotton Company, in 1936. Brooks retired in 1972.

== Hunting ==
Brooks was a keen hunter and shot animals across the United States, Alaska, Canada, and Mexico. Brooks traveled with his family to Kenya in 1947 for a hunting expedition with his wife, Virginia, and 14-year-old daughter, also called Virginia. They were accompanied by two white big-game hunters and fifteen African bearers and covered a distance of 4,000 miles (6,400 km). During the expedition Brooks' daughter shot a lion, cheetah, rhino and other game. She killed an elephant with four shots from within 25 yards (23 m) distance and was thought to be the youngest girl to have shot an elephant dead in Kenya. Virginia stated "I have confidence in myself. I didn't find anything to be afraid of. It was something I've always lived for" and planned to mount the animal's head and make its feet into wastebaskets. The expedition featured as a story in Life magazine on September 29, 1947, with photographs of Brooks' daughter stood next to her kills. The feature prompted Henry Fairfield Osborn Jr., president of the New York Zoological Society, to write to the magazine to lament the killing of the animals. Brooks' wife did not hunt and said "Heavens, I couldn’t hit the side of a barn."

Brooks used the trophies from his 1947 expedition to found the Berry B. Brooks African Hall at the Memphis City Museum (now the Pink Palace Museum and Planetarium), and it became a major attraction there. He undertook further expeditions including an 8-month safari in Africa in 1949, a trip to Vietnam in 1967, two further African expeditions in 1962 and 1965 and a trip to India in 1967. On one of his expeditions to East Africa Brooks tended to the hunter Roy Lintey while he lay dying from a wound inflicted by a charging buffalo.

Around 160 of Brooks' buffalo kills were recorded in Rowland Ward's Record Book. Brooks' hunting diary was serialized in Outdoor Life in 1951 and afterwards published in book form as Passport to Safariland. He took film and photographs of his expeditions which he used in a series of lecture and later favored documenting the animals rather than shooting them. Brooks won the Weatherby Trophy for International Sportsman of the Year in 1959 and in 1963 was named as one of the six greatest living hunters by Sports Afield. He also won the Allwyn Cooper Trophy for best head trophy from an Indian animal and the Nyalaland Trophy for the best from Mozambique. Brooks became the first living American to be inducted into the International Hunting Hall of Fame in 1973.

== Personal life ==
Brooks married Virginia Feild Walton on April 27, 1929, in Blytheville, Arkansas. The couple's daughter Virginia Walton Brooks was born June 4, 1933, in Memphis. Brooks lived in Memphis on a 322 acres (130 ha) hillside estate in Raleigh, which he named Epping Forest Manor. He raised cattle there and his daughter had a flock of 14 peacocks. Brooks also maintained farms in Arkansas and Tennessee where he raised cattle. During a period when he was producing documentary films he lived in Hollywood, California. Brooks was friends with Anne Stevens, the mother of the actor George Hamilton. Stevens and Hamilton lived with the Brooks for a while at Epping Forest Manor and Brooks frequently took Hamilton hunting.

In the late 1940s or early 1950s Brooks purchased a book in Paris (Louis Richeome's 1608 L’Idolatrie Huguenote) that was thought to be bound in human skin. After his death the book was sold to a bookdealer who, in 1986, sold it to the library of the University of Memphis. They had the book tested by radioimmunoassay at the University of California which indicated the binding to be human skin. Peptide mass fingerprinting tests carried out by the Anthropodermic Book Project in 2015 proved the book was bound in sheepskin.

Brooks suffered from an enlarged heart which left him weakened from 1973. He died at his home in Memphis on January 21, 1976, at age 73. He suffered a heart attack at around 1:10 am, but a fire department medical team could not revive him and he died at 2:20 am.
