= Barry Brooks (disambiguation) =

Barry Brooks (born 1983) is an Australian rules footballer.

Barry Brooks may also refer to:

- Barry Macey Brooks (born 1975), American football player
- Barry Brooks (diplomat), High Commissioner from New Zealand to India

== See also ==
- Barry Brook (disambiguation)
