= Charmaine Brooks =

Canadian rock singer and songwriter

- Born: February 7, 1970 (age 56); Stratford, Ontario, Canada
- Genres: Soft Rock, Rock, Indie
- Occupations: Singer, songwriter, musician, record producer, internet radio dj
- Years active: 1991 – present
- Label: Unsigned

Charmaine Brooks is a Canadian rock singer and songwriter born in Stratford, Ontario, Canada. Charmaine began learning to play guitar at an early age, she then switched to drums, and began studying under local drummer Wayne Brown. She said " singing was not something I ever thought I could do well"

Her musical influences she credits as Melissa Etheridge, Patty Smyth (Scandal) Sheryl Crow, Lisa Marie Presley and fellow Canadians Sass Jordan, Jann Arden and Alannah Myles, whom she just might have been trying to be in her first band The Mixx who supported local Canadian groups Helix and Big House.

One of her biggest influences she credits is the 1988 movie "Satisfaction" starring Justine Bateman and Liam Neeson, and the lead guitarist in the film who played Billy, Britta Phillips.

In 1995 Brooks quit The Mixx to concentrate on writing songs, before returning to performing live with She Says So, a name she says she made up herself.

Her debut CD "Fill Me Up" was released in 2005, co-produced with her friend Kathy Luckhardt. The album took almost a year to record. Links to the CD were put on the internet in a bid to generate interest. Attention for the project was received on Jordismusic.com and Melissa Etheridge Information Network. From the latter, Brooks learned about an all women internet radio station called NTG Radio. NTG was named after Melissa Etheridge's 1995 song, "Nowhere to Go". After meeting with the station owners of NTG, Charmaine became a part of the NTG family. NTG evolved into WomenRock Radio in late 2006.

Since 2005, she has hosted her own interview show called Doing Time, in which she has interviewed female musicians. These include Britta Phillips, Alannah Myles, Sophie B Hawkins, Taylor Dayne, Suzi Quatro, Dilana, Storm Large and fellow Canadian Sass Jordan. She interviews the artists one-on-one, asking them questions about their music careers.

Charmaine is currently in a 4-piece band "She Says So" with Sherry Saunders, Alison Dale and Sebastian Zulauf. She is also in another band named Divorce Party. Divorce Party consists of Brooks, Sherry Seb, and Sherry Saunders.

Charmaine's show, "Doing Time", was featured on www.womenrockradio.com till the station disbanded.

== Track listing ==
- Please Don't Go
- Time Like This
- Fly Away
- How Can I Say Goodbye
- To Be in Love
- Everybody's Gone
- Cry in The Dark
- Broken Promises
- Black Jaguar
- I Still Love You
- You Deserve So Much Better
- Fill Me Up
