= Tim Brooks =

Tim or Timothy Brooks may refer to:

- Tim Brooks (basketball) (born 1971), American former professional basketball player in Lithuania
- Tim Brooks (historian) (born 1942), American television and radio historian, author and retired television executive
- Tim Brooks, bassist of American punk band Bold
- Tim Brooks (wrestler) (1947–2020), American professional wrestler
- Verdell Smith (a.k.a. Tim Brooks, born 1963), professional boxer in the light welterweight division
- Tim "Top Gun" Brooks, former guitarist for American pop punk band Set Your Goals
- Timothy L. Brooks (born 1964), American federal judge
- Sir Timothy Brooks (Lord Lieutenant) (1929–2014), English landowner, farmer, politician and public servant

== See also ==
- Timothy Brook (born 1951), Canadian author specializing in the history of China
