= Joshua Brooks =

Joshua Brooks may refer to:

- Joshua William Brooks (1790–1882), English religious leader
- J. Twing Brooks (1884–1956), American politician
- Joshua Brooks House, a historic building in Lincoln, Massachusetts, U.S.

== See also ==
- Joshua Brookes (disambiguation)
