= Boruch Greenfeld =

Rabbi Boruch Greenfeld
- ברוך גרינפעלד
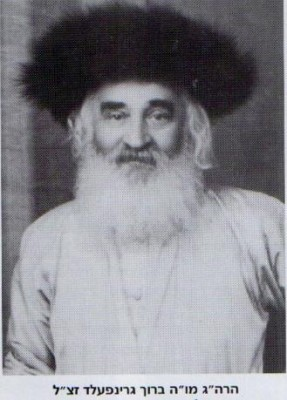
- Rabbi Boruch Greenfield

Personal life
- Born: 1872 Humenne, Zemplén County, Kingdom of Hungary
- Died: 1956 (aged 83–84)
- Spouse: Rivkah Weinberger
- Children: 5 (including Miriam)
- Occupation: Rabbi, Torah scholar

Religious life
- Religion: Judaism
- Denomination: Haredi Judaism

Boruch Greenfeld (Yiddish: ברוך גרינפעלד; 1872–1956), was a rabbi and Torah scholar.

== Biography ==
Born in Humenne, Slovakia (then Zemplén County, Kingdom of Hungary), Greenfield studied in Kisvárda under Moshe Greenwald. In 1891 he married Rivkah, the daughter of Shlomo Yosef Weinberger, in Stropkov where he founded a small yeshiva. Later he became the dayan (rabbinic judge) of Shebesh, Potneck, and Hermenshtat.

Greenfeld was instrumental in the creation of the separatist Anti-Zionist community in Klausenberg in the 1920s. Due to the laws governing the creation of communities at the time, the community was registered as Sephardic, even though its members were Hasidic.

In 1923 he immigrated to the United States where he was a rabbi in several Pennsylvania cities and then in New York City, first in the Bronx and then the Lower East Side. In 1935 he moved to Palestine and was affiliated with the Edah HaChareidis.

In 1976 his family published his writings under the title Ohel Boruch.

== Family ==
Greenfeld married Rivkah Weinberger in 1891 and had five children that reached adulthood, Miriam, Ruchel, Eidel, Mirel, and Sarah. Miriam married Nusen Baumhaft, the Rosh Yeshiva of Klausenberg. The two of them, together with fourteen of their fifteen children, perished in the Holocaust. Ruchel married Ahron Klausner, a Torah scholar, with whom she had two children. Eidel, married to Shimon Fischman, remained childless. Mirel, married to Chaim Pall, died during childbirth and was also left childless. The fifth child, Sarah, married Dovid Yaakov Friedman and they had six daughters.

== Sources ==
1. Ohel Boruch
2. Moshian Shel Yisroel, by Shloima Yankel Gelbman
3. Yitzchak Yosef HaCohen (1989). Chachmei Tranyslvania. Machon Yerushalayim.
4. Weinstein, Avraham Avish Hacohen (1968). Sefer Zichron Stropkov. Brooklyn: Deutsch Publishing and Printing Company.
5. Lkoros Hayhadus BTranselvany by Tzvi Yaakov Abraham pub. 1951
