= Thomas Brooks =

Thomas, Thom, Tom, or Tommy Brooks may refer to:

== Politics and religion ==
- Thomas Brooks (Puritan) (1608–1680), Puritan minister and author
- Thomas Brooks, American minister after whom Brookfield, Connecticut, was named
- Thomas Brooks, 1st Baron Crawshaw (1825–1908), British peer
- Thomas Brooks (Labour politician) (1880–1958), British Labour Party MP
- Overton Brooks (Thomas Overton Brooks, 1897–1961), U.S. representative from Louisiana
- Thomas Norman Brooks (1924–1992), American politician in Mississippi

== Sports ==
- Tom Brooks (umpire) (1919–2007), Australian cricket umpire and cricketer
- Tom Brooks (footballer) (born 1948), English footballer for Lincoln City
- Tommy Brooks (1954–2025), American boxer and trainer

== Other ==
- Thomas Brooks (died 1896), American thief whose death ignited the Brooks–McFarland feud
- Thomas A. Brooks (born 1937), U.S. Navy rear admiral and former director of the Office of Naval Intelligence
- Thomas Brooks III (born 1948), American convicted murderer and fugitive
- Tom Brooks (music producer) (born 1954), American music producer
- Thom Brooks (born 1973), philosopher and legal scholar
- Tom Brooks (writer), British pioneer of theories on prehistoric geometry
- T. B. Henderson Brooks (Thomas Bryan Henderson Brooks, 1909–1997), Indian Army general
- Tom "Cactus" Brooks (1910–1997), television star and radio announcer in Louisville, Kentucky

== See also ==
- Thomas Brooke (disambiguation)
- Toms Brook, a river in Virginia
- Tom Brook (born 1953), American journalist
- Brooks Thomas (1931–2010), American publishing executive
- Thomas Brooks Mills (1857–1930), American politician and businessman
