= Kevin Brooks =

Kevin Brooks may refer to:

- Kevin Brooks (basketball) (born 1969), American basketball player
- Kevin Brooks (American football) (born 1963), former Dallas Cowboys football player
- Kevin Brooks (writer) (born 1959), English writer of young-adult fiction
- Kevin Brooks (cricketer) (born 1959), English cricketer
- Kevin Brooks (politician) (born 1967), Republican member of the Tennessee House of Representatives
