= Wilks Brooks House =

Historic house in Tennessee, United States

- U.S. National Register of Historic Places
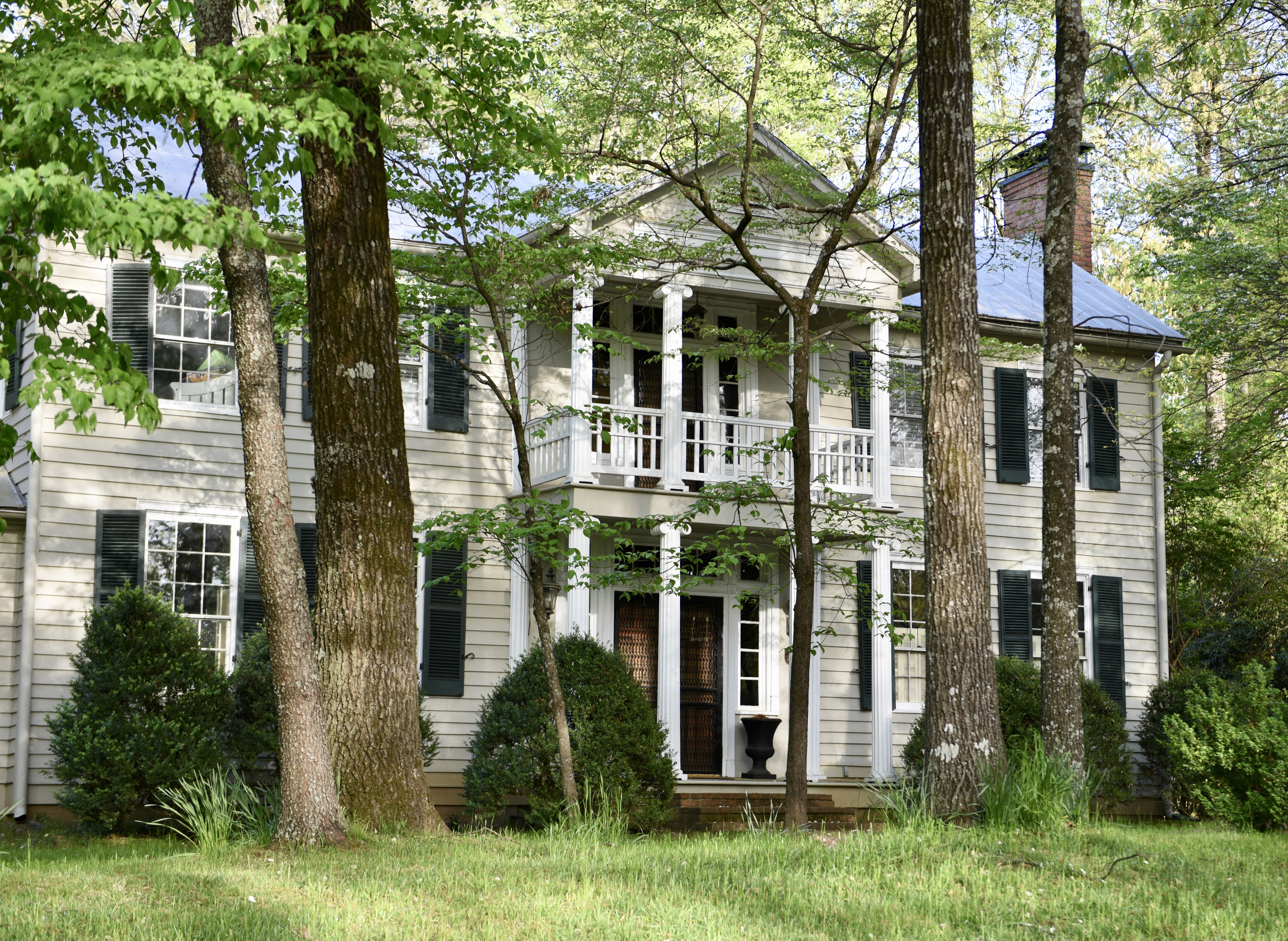

- Location within Tennessee Location within the United States
- Location: 2000 Old Oak Dr., Memphis, Tennessee
- Coordinates: 35.09433°N 89.84767°W
- Area: 0.7 acres (0.28 ha)
- Built: 1834
- Architectural style: Greek Revival
- NRHP reference No.: 80003859
- Added to NRHP: May 16, 1980

The Wilks Brooks House is a home in Memphis, Tennessee, listed on the National Register of Historic Places. The house was built by Wilks Brooks and his fifteen-year-old son Joseph Brooks; construction started in October 1834 and ended in 1835.

The Wilks Brooks house is the oldest example of Greek Revival architecture in the Shelby County, Tennessee area. It is an L-shaped dwelling with two stories and has a central hallway, known as a dog-trot, with rooms to the left and right. Wood on the property, elm, poplar and cedar, was used to construct the home. Bricks and nails used were made on the property. The inside of the walls are made from plaster fortified with horsehair.

The home became the residence for Wilks Brooks' family in 1836. It served as the center of a large plantation and was located on the Cherokee Trace, once the trail used by American Indians as a major trading route. Cotton grown on the plantation was taken to Memphis to be sold, first by mule-drawn wagons, and later shipped by the railroad after the completion of the Memphis and Charleston Railroad in 1853.

The home was occupied by members of Brooks' family until 1898. During the American Civil War, the home served as a hospital for Confederate soldiers, and later the Union troops of the 7th Regiment Kansas Volunteer Cavalry used the home as headquarters and camped on the grounds. They used miles of fencing for firewood and killed hogs and cattle to feed the troops.

In 1898, Agnes Nelson Brooks died, and the home was no longer occupied by family members. It sat empty for years until in 1973, descendants of Wilks Brooks moved the home to another location on the property and began reconstruction. Reconstruction was completed in 2002 and the home has been occupied by tenants since then. It is currently under private ownership.
