= Steve Brooks =

Stephen, Steve, or Steven Brooks may refer to:

== Entertainment ==
- Stephen Brooks (actor) (1942–1999), American film and television actor
- Steve Brooks (singer), American folk singer/songwriter
- Steve Brooks, guitarist for American metal band Torche
- Steven Brooks (born 1971), former Kidsongs kid
- Stephen Brooks, fictional title character of the 1969 film Hannibal Brooks
- Steve Brooks, fictional superhero known as the Stunt-Master

== Sports ==
- Steve Brooks (basketball) (1950–2022), American basketball player
- Steve Brooks (jockey) (1922–1979), American Hall of Fame jockey
- Steve Brooks (rower) (born 1948), American rower at the 1968 Summer Olympics
- Steven Brooks (lacrosse) (born 1984), American lacrosse player
- Steve Brooks, pseudonyme of Philippe Haezebrouck (born 1954), French motosport driver

== Other ==
- Stephen Brooks (academic) (born 1971), American associate professor of government
- Steve Brooks (entomologist) (born 1955), British entomologist
- Steve Brooks (statistician) (born 1970), British statistician
- Steven Brooks (Nevada politician), former American politician
- Stephen A. Brooks, founder of Brooks Instrument
- Stephen R. Brooks, (1967) primary school teacher in London, then Gloucestershire

== See also ==
- Stephen Brookes (born 1956), English cricketer
- Brooks Stevens (1911–1995), American industrial designer
