= Alette =

- Commune
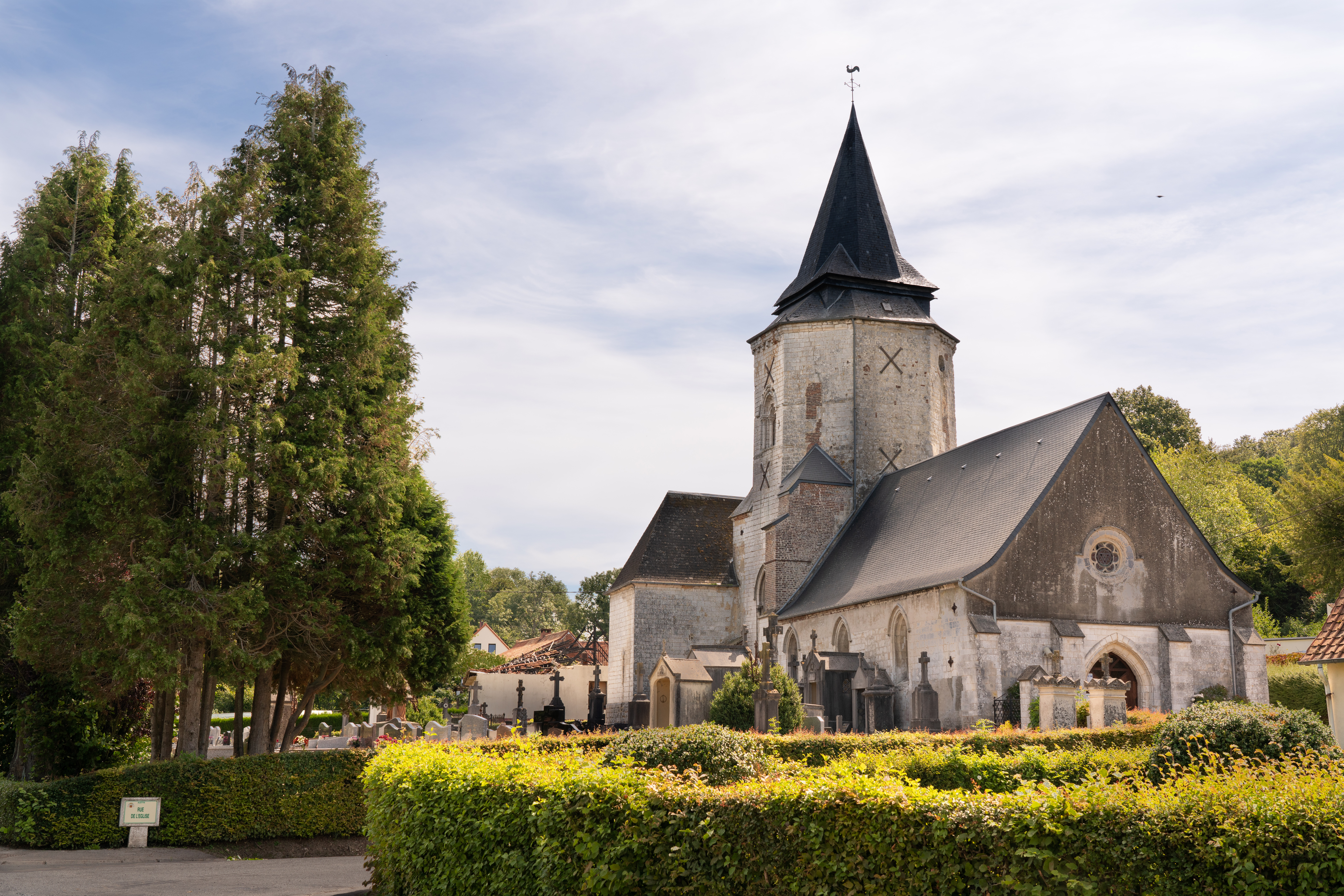
- The church of Alette

- Flag Coat of arms
- Location of Alette
- Location within France Location within Hauts-de-France
- Coordinates: 50°31′07″N 1°49′44″E
- Country: France
- Region: Hauts-de-France
- Department: Pas-de-Calais
- Arrondissement: Montreuil
- Canton: Lumbres
- Intercommunality: Haut Pays du Montreuillois

Government
  - Mayor (2020–2026): Constant Vasseur
- Area^{1}: 13.87 km^{2} (5.36 sq mi)
- Elevation: 32 m (105 ft)
- Highest elevation: 162 m (531 ft)
- Lowest elevation: 26 m (85 ft)
- Population (2023): 365
  - Density: 26.3/km^{2} (68.2/sq mi)
- Time zone: UTC+01:00 (CET)
  - Summer (DST): UTC+02:00 (CEST)
- INSEE/Postal code: 62021 /62650
- ^{1} French Land Register data, which excludes lakes, ponds, glaciers > 1 km^{2} (0.386 sq mi or 247 acres) and river estuaries.

Alette (French pronunciation: [alɛt]) is a commune in the Pas-de-Calais department in northern France.

== Geography ==
A small village situated some 5 miles(3 km) northeast of Montreuil-sur-Mer, on the D151 road.

== Population ==
Historical population
Year	Pop.	±% p.a.
1968	256	—
1975	216	−2.40%
1982	235	+1.21%
1990	260	+1.27%
1999	249	−0.48%
2007	311	+2.82%
2012	380	+4.09%
2017	386	+0.31%
2023	365	−0.93%
Source: INSEE

== Sights ==
- The church. When constructed, in the 12th century, the tower consisted of four triple windows separated by small bays. It was severely damaged in 1544 and it was necessary to reconstruct three of the sides without windows. The spire dates from 1585. The tower is classified as an historic monument.

== See also ==
- Communes of the Pas-de-Calais department
