= Robin Brooks (disambiguation) =

Robin Brooks (born 1961) is a British radio dramatist.

Robin Brooks may also refer to:

- Robin Brooks (fictional character), Numb3rs character
- Robin Brooks (Miss California), Miss California

== See also ==
- Robin Brook (disambiguation)
- Robin Brooke (born 1966), New Zealand rugby player
