= Gabriel Brooks =

Gabriel Brooks (1704–1741) was an English calligrapher.

== Life ==
Brooks was apprenticed to Dennis Smith, a writing-master in Castle Street, Southwark. He kept a day school in Burr Street, Wapping, until his death in 1741. Smith's widow married a supposed relation of his, William Brooks, who in 1717, when only twenty-one years old, published a work entitled 'A Delightful Recreation.'

== Works ==
Little remains of Brooks's skill in penmanship besides some plates scattered through a rare folio work on calligraphy, The Universal Penman, subtitled The Art of Writing made useful written with the assistance of several of the most eminent Masters, and Engraved by George Bickham, London, 1741. These plates (nine in all) consist of No. 29, 'Idleness;' 33, 'Discretion;' 38, 'Modesty:' 66, 'Musick;' No. 2 after 66, 'To the Author of the Tragedy of Cato;' 68, 'Painting;' No. 1 after 68, 'On Sculpture ' (signed A.D. 1737); one unnumbered, 'Liberty;' and one on 'Credit' in the second part of the work relating to merchandise and trade.
