= Eric Brooks =

Erick Brooks may refer to:

- E-Swift (Erick Brooks), American hip hop DJ
- Eric Brooks, also known as Blade, a Marvel Comics superhero
  - Blade (New Line Blade franchise character)
- Eric Brooks (politician) (born 1971), member of the West Virginia House of Delegates

== See also ==
- Eric Brook (1907–1965), English footballer
- Eric Brookes (1894–1918), British flying ace
- Erik Brooks, founder of Ethos Capital
- Erik Brooks (Canadian football) (born 1999), American football player
