= R. Leonard Brooks =

English mathematician (1916–1993)

- Born: Rowland Leonard Brooks; 6 February 1916; Lincolnshire, England
- Died: 18 June 1993 (aged 77)
- Education: Trinity College, Cambridge

Rowland Leonard Brooks (February 6, 1916 – June 18, 1993) was an English mathematician, known for proving Brooks's theorem on the relation between the chromatic number and the degree of graphs. He was born in Lincolnshire, England, studied at Trinity College, Cambridge University, and also worked with fellow Trinity students W. T. Tutte, Cedric Smith, and Arthur Harold Stone on the problem of "Squaring the square" (partitioning rectangles and squares into unequal squares), both under their own names and under the pseudonym Blanche Descartes.

After leaving Cambridge, he worked as a full-time tax inspector.
