= Arthur Brooks (footballer) =

English footballer

Personal information
- Full name: Arthur Frederick Brooks
- Date of birth: 4 October 1891
- Place of birth: Henstead, England
- Date of death: 8 December 1976 (aged 85)
- Position: Forward

Senior career*
Years	Team	Apps	(Gls)
1907	Yarmouth Town		
1907–1908	Gorleston		
1908–1909	Norwich City		
1909–1910	Grimsby Town	4	(2)
1910–191?	Doncaster Rovers		
- * Club domestic league appearances and goals

Arthur Brooks (4 October 1891 – 8 December 1976) was an English professional footballer who played as a forward.
