= Myra Brooks Turner =

American composer (1936–2017)

Myra Brooks Turner (13 January 1936 – 7 October 2017) was an American composer, music educator, and writer, who composed for television commercials as well as for musical theatre, piano, and voice.

Brooks was born in Knoxville, Tennessee, to Paul D. and Lillie R. Brooks. She began music lessons at the Juilliard School of Music when she was 12, then earned bachelor's and master's degrees in music from the Southern Methodist University in Dallas, Texas. Her post graduate study in piano was with Paul Vellucci in Dallas. She married Ronald Joseph Turner in 1960 and they had three daughters: Stacy, Cheryl, and Teresa.

Brooks taught music at Mercer University in Georgia, at the Maryville (Tennessee) College of Performing Arts, and at the University of Tennessee in Knoxville. She managed two businesses: MBT Productions and the Myra Brooks Turner Studio of Music in Knoxville, as well as two performance groups associated with her teaching studio: the Beethoven Society and the Chopin Society. Through these societies, she produced seven concerts annually.

Over the years, Brooks directed several church choirs. She served as composer-in-residence for the Birmingham (Alabama) Children's Theatre from 1967 to 1969, wrote TV commercials, and directed recording sessions. She was president of the Camelot Fine Arts Club, and received the Award of Merit from the Tennessee Arts Commission as "an outstanding member of the cultural force of the state of Tennessee who has helped to nurture and develop the arts in Tennessee."

Fluent in French, Brooks published a textbook, Les Gens, Les Endroits et Les Choses (People, Places and Things). For several years, her column "Composer's Corner" appeared in the National Federation of Music Clubs Junior Keynotes Magazine with her original compositions. She wrote articles about musical research and "Pupil Saver" columns for Clavier Magazine, and edited the Texas Federation of Music Clubs Bulletin.

Brooks composed many piano and vocal works, encompassing at least 72 opus numbers. Her music is published by FJH Music Co. Inc., McLaughlin & Reilly Co., and Schaum Publications Inc. Her compositions include:

== Piano ==
- Fantasy in a minor
- Jazz Man Suite
- Man Speaks Through Music
- Musical Moods
- Praise the Lord Jesus Christ
- Waltzing Windmills
- Waltz Parisienne

== Musical theatre ==
- Cinderella
- Flibberty-Gibbet
- Green Dragon
- Javoho Junction
- Make Way for Love
- Midsummer Night's Dream
- Pinocchio

== Vocal ==
- Contemporary Art Song Suite (text by William Blake)
- Suddenly, My Heart Sings (art songs)
