= Jade Brooks =

American author and advocate

- Born: Jade Helena Brooks; 1992 (age 33–34); Toronto, Ontario, Canada
- Writing career
- Notable work: The Teen Sex Trade: My Story
- Website: jadehelena.com

Jade Helena Brooks is an author and advocate known for her autobiography The Teen Sex Trade: My Story. Her activism work centres around helping sexually exploited youth and raising awareness.

== Career ==
Following her exit from the sex industry in 2011, Brooks began working with an agency in Toronto to help other victims of the sexual exploitation. She helped to create The Stages of Sexual Exploitation, a tool to help identify if someone is being sexually exploited.

Her first book, The Teen Sex Trade: My Story, was published in September 2017. She self-published a follow-up book, Renegade: Teen Sex Trade Part Two.

In 2019, Brooks was featured at Pictou County's symposium on human trafficking. Brooks helped to develop a module of online program, Supporting Survivors of Sexual Violence: A Nova Scotia Resource, focussed on the exploitation of children and youth in 2021.

== Books ==
- The Teen Sex Trade: My Story (2017)
- Renegade: Teen Sex Trade Part Two (2021)

== Personal life ==
Brooks has four siblings. She was born in Toronto and grew up in the Uniacke Square area of Halifax, Nova Scotia. At age 11, she was placed into the Nova Scotia foster care system. Brooks met the man who would become her boyfriend and, later, trafficker, at age 15. She was trafficked in both Toronto and Montreal. Brooks was able to exit trafficking and the sex trade at age 19.
