= Ernie Brooks (footballer) =

English footballer

Personal information
- Full name: Joseph Ernest Brooks
- Date of birth: 20 November 1892
- Place of birth: Heanor, England
- Date of death: 1975 (aged 82–83)
- Height: 5 ft 7 in (1.70 m)
- Position: Winger

Senior career*
Years	Team	Apps	(Gls)
1914–1919	Langley Heanor		
1919–1920	Grimsby Town	3	(0)
1920–1921	Shirebrook		
1921–1922	Leicester City	4	(0)
1922–1923	Shirebrook		
1923–1924	Kettering		
1924–192?	Shirebrook		
- * Club domestic league appearances and goals

Joseph Ernest "Ernie" Brooks (20 November 1892 – 1975) was an English professional footballer who played as a winger.
