= Norman Brooks =

Norman Brooks may refer to:

- Norman Brooks (singer) (1928–2006), Canadian singer
- Norman Brooks (swimmer) (1910–1953), English Olympic swimmer

== See also ==
- Norman Brookes (1877–1968), Australian tennis champion
- Norman Brook, 1st Baron Normanbrook (1902–1967), British civil servant
