= Karen Brooks =

Karen Brooks may refer to:

- Karen Brooks (singer) (born 1954), American country music singer and songwriter
- Karen Brooks (author), Australian author, columnist, social commentator and academic
- Karen Brooks (food critic), American food critic and writer
- Karen B. Brooks, former U.S. diplomat
- Karen Brooks Hopkins, president of Brooklyn Academy of Music
