= Maria Gowen Brooks =

American poet

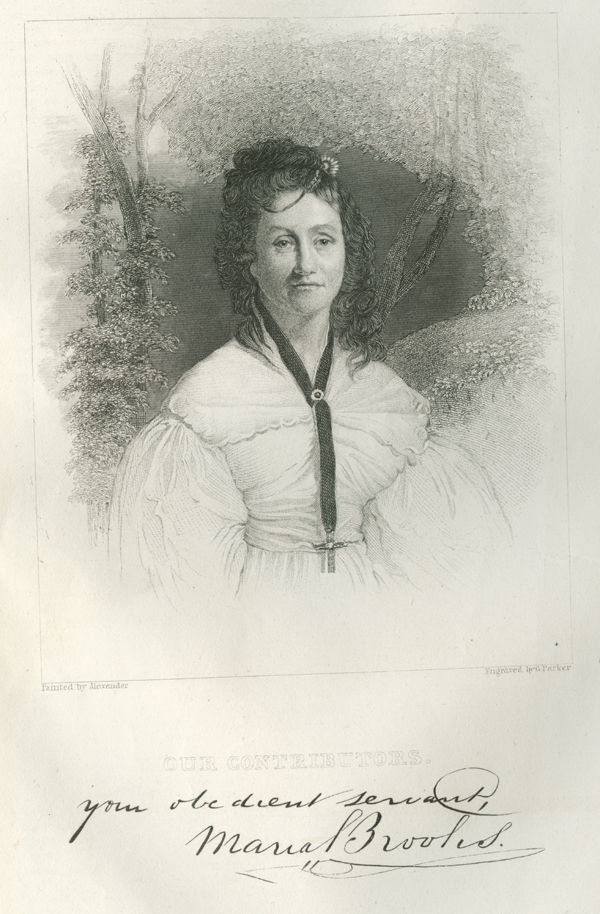
- Born: Abigail Gowen; 1794; Medford, Massachusetts, United States
- Died: November 11, 1845 (aged 51)
- Resting place: Limonar Church Cemetery, Matanzas
- Occupation: Poet
- Notable work: Zophiël, or The Bride of Seven

Maria Gowen (or Gowan) Brooks (born Abigail Gowen; pen names A Lover of Fine Arts and María Del Occidente; 1794 – November 11, 1845) was an American poet. She impressed Edgar Allan Poe and the English Poet Laureate, Robert Southey, who promoted her best-known poem Zóphiël.

== Early life and education ==
Abigail Gowen was born in Medford, Massachusetts, to Eleanor née Cutter and William Gowen. She was christened Abigail Gowen. Her father was a man of literary tastes, and she was exposed to a lot of poetry at home. By age nine, she had memorized a large quantity of prose. When Abigail was thirteen, her father died, bankrupt. She was taken under the care of a her widowed brother-in-law John Brooks, a Boston merchant who was more than thirty years older than she was. As her legal guardian, he proposed to her when she was 14 and they married when she was 16. She became the stepmother of his two children and the couple had an unhappy marriage, especially after John lost his fortune in investments related to the War of 1812.

== Career ==
With the family's financial reverses and living in comparative poverty, Abigail began to write poetry as consolation. In 1809, her father died. The next year, at the age of sixteen, she married John Brooks, the widower of her deceased sister, Lucretia. Around this time, she was rebaptized Mary Abigail Brooks. By age nineteen, she had written her first epic poem. It is described as a "metrical romance"; she never published it.

In 1811, her first son, Edgar, was born. Brooks moved with her husband to Portland, Maine, in 1812. Unsuccessful investments in privateering ships had led to John Brooks losing much of his money. In 1813, a second son, Horace, was born.

In the hopes of earning some income, in 1820 Brooks published her first collection of poetry, Judith, Esther, and other Poems, under the pseudonym "A Lover of Fine Arts". In 1823, the husband died, and Brooks went to live with her brother on his coffee plantation in Manzanas, Cuba. The brother died soon after her arrival, which left her with a "settled income". During this time, she began to write the poem she would become most famous for: Zophiël, or the Bride of Seven, based on the story of Sara in the Book of Tobit. Brooks began to prefer the name "Maria" after her time in Cuba.

In 1824, Brooks made a sojourn to Canada, where she became engaged to a Canadian soldier she had met in New England prior to John Brooks’ death. However, they became estranged, "through a series of misunderstandings", and Brooks subsequently twice attempted suicide by opium. Upon returning to the United States, in 1825, she published the first canto of Zóphiël in Boston. In 1826, Brooks began a correspondence with the English Poet Laureate, Robert Southey, who praised her work heartily and gave her the pseudonym "María Del Occidente" (Maria of the West). He regarded her as "the most impassioned and imaginative of all poetesses", but time did not sustain this verdict. She also caught the attention of Edgar Allan Poe. He, too, praised her work, and often mentioned her favorably in his literary reviews.

Brooks finished Zóphiël in 1829, but did not publish it immediately. First, she took her son, Horace Brooks, to Hanover, New Hampshire, to try to enroll him at West Point. She was unsuccessful. However, in the same year, she visited Paris, and there met the Marquis de Lafayette, a man renowned for his heroic services in the American Revolutionary War. He was easily able to secure a position at West Point for Brooks's son, who went on to be modestly successful there. Zóphiël is based on the Book of Tobit. In it, a fallen angel falls in love with a human woman.

In 1831, she went to England and spent a few weeks at Southey's home. There, he oversaw the publishing of Zóphiël in London. She then returned to the United States and lived in New England for approximately twelve years. In 1843, she serially published a "prose account of her unhappy love affair", called Idomen; or, the Vale of Yumuri, in a Boston newspaper. In December of the same year, she returned to her Cuban estate and published another poem, Ode to the Departed.

She died in 1845, at age 51, of tropical fever. She had been working on a romance at the time, Beatriz, Beloved of Columbus which was never published. She was buried in Limonar Church Cemetery in Matanzas, Cuba.

According to Notable American Women 1607-1950:

Maria Brooks occasionally reached poetic heights, and she received praise from reputable critics, though some felt her efforts were too lofty for American tastes and ill adapted to the English taste, 'which had been surfeited with "Don Juan" and Tom Moore.' Griswold placed her at the pinnacle of American poetesses and, at some risk, acclaimed her the 'only American poet of her sex whose mind was thoroughly educated.' Southey praised her highly, and after deriding the popular theory of the soul mates revealed in Zóphiël, called her 'the most empassioned and most imaginative of all poetesses.
