= Joseph B. Brooks =

Arkansas politician

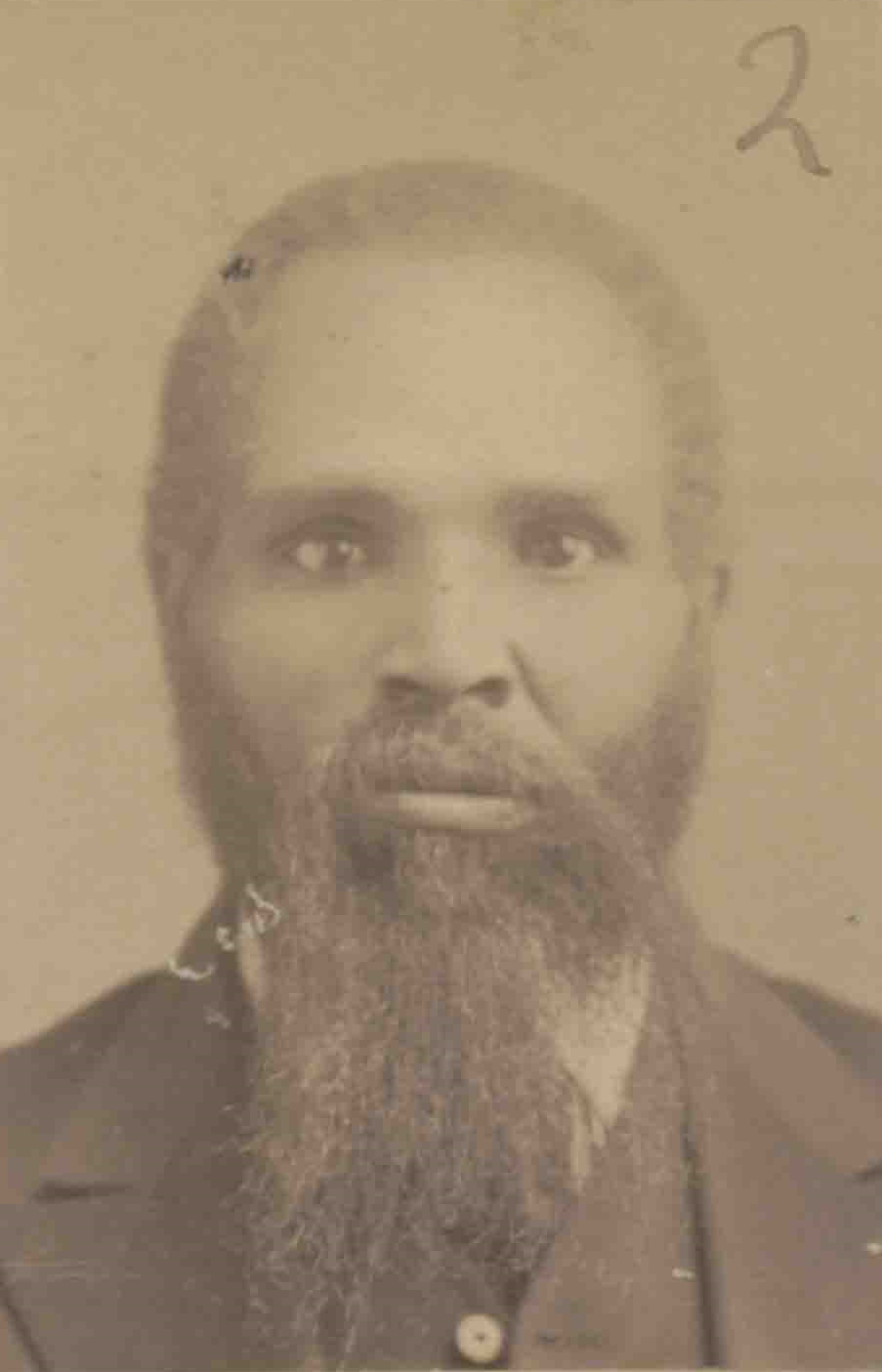

1885 House of Representatives composite photo of the Twenty-Fifth General Assembly of the State of Arkansas

Joseph B. Brooks (born c. 1840) was a state legislator in Arkansas. He represented Lafayette County, Arkansas in the Arkansas House of Representatives in 1885. According to the captioning from an 1885 photograph of Arkansas representatives he was born in Missouri, was a Baptist minister, and his post office was in Lewisville, Arkansas. It states he was 45 in 1885 and was a Republican.

While a representative he served on the Committee on Elections and on the Committee on Roads and Highways. He is listed as introducing House Bill No. 143 "An Act to amend Section 3651 of Mansfield's Digest" and House Bill No. 345 "An act to amend section 6025 of the Revised Statutes of the State of Arkansas approved February 6, 1875".

He was born circa 1840 and died sometime after 1900.

== See also ==
- African American officeholders from the end of the Civil War until before 1900
