= Aaron Brooks =

Aaron Brooks may refer to:

- Aaron Brooks (American football) (born 1976), American football player
- Aaron Brooks (baseball) (born 1990), American baseball player
- Aaron Brooks (basketball) (born 1985), American basketball player
- Aaron Brooks (wrestler) (born 2000), American wrestler
- Aaron A. Brooks (born 1964), American drummer
