= Morgan Brooks =

Morgan Brooks (March 12, 1861 – April 23, 1947) was an American inventor, engineer, and academic from Massachusetts. After studying at Brown University and the Stevens Institute of Technology, Brooks worked at the American Bell Telephone Company to implement their copper wire system. He then worked for the Electrical Accumulator Company of Philadelphia before introducing an alternating current lighting system to St. Paul, Minnesota. He founded a successful electrical engineering company, then accepted an offer of department chair at the University of Nebraska. After three years, he moved on to the University of Illinois, where he spent the rest of his career.

== Biography ==
Morgan Brooks was born in Boston, Massachusetts, on March 12, 1861. He attended preparatory school at the Roxbury Latin School, then matriculated at Brown University in 1877. He graduated with a degree in mathematics. Brooks decided to pursue further education in engineering and spent two years at the Stevens Institute of Technology in Hoboken, New Jersey. He was awarded a mechanical engineering degree in 1883 for his thesis on an Otto gas engine. The Boston agents of Otto then hired Brooks as an engineer.

In 1884, Brooks was hired by the American Bell Telephone Company to implement copper wire specifications and to test consumer-grade telephones. Two years later, Theodore Newton Vail convinced Brooks to join the Boston office of the Electrical Accumulator Company of Philadelphia. There, Brooks prepared specifications for storage battery installation. One project saw Brooks working on one of the first train car lighting experiments, on the Old Colony Railroad. In 1887, he was commissioned by the St. Paul Gas Light Company to introduce alternating current Westinghouse Electric lamps. Brooks founded the Electrical Engineering Company of St. Paul-Minneapolis as a contractor for power, light, and telephone plants. The company became the leading regional provider of these services. Brooks patented and implemented a sidetone-eliminating intercommunicating telephone system for Northfield, Minnesota, which had over one hundred subscribers.

Brooks was offered a position as chair of the school of electrical engineering at the University of Nebraska. He led the department for three years until he was recruited by the University of Illinois. He oversaw a five-fold growth in the number of students in the department. At Illinois, Brooks developed self-synchronizing alternators, which featured reactances without iron cores. He also developed the first formula for the calculation of the inductance of coreless coils. Later work found him focusing on street lighting in small towns and lighting in large rooms.

Brooks married Frona Marie Brooks in 1888. They had eight children: Henry Morgan, Charles Franklin, Frances, Frederick Augustus, Roger, Edith, Frona Marguerite, and Dorothy Prescott. Brooks died on April 23, 1947, after a short illness in Lincoln, Nebraska. His papers are held by Swarthmore College.

== Patents ==
- Telephone-exchange (1895)
- Automatic telephone system (1896)
- Means for operating alternating-current machines in parallel (1908)
