= Horace Brooks =

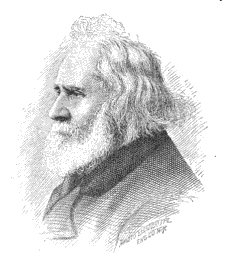
- Brooks in 1889
- Born: August 14, 1814; Boston, Massachusetts, U.S.
- Died: January 13, 1894 (aged 79); Kissimmee, Florida, U.S.
- Burial place: Green-Wood Cemetery in Brooklyn, New York City
- Military career
- Allegiance: United States of America; Union
- Branch: United States Army; Union Army
- Service years: 1835–1877
- Rank: Colonel; Brevet Brigadier General
- Commands: 4th United States Artillery Regiment; Presidio of San Francisco
- Conflicts: Second Seminole War; Battle of Withlacoochee; Mexican–American War; Siege of Veracruz; Battle of Cerro Gordo; Battle of Contreras; Battle of Churubusco; Battle of Molino del Rey; Battle of Chapultepec; Bleeding Kansas; American Civil War

Horace Brooks (August 14, 1814 – January 13, 1894) was an officer in the Regular Army of the United States from 1835 – 1877. After graduating the United States Military Academy at West Point, he served in the Second Seminole War. During the Mexican–American War he was promoted to the rank of captain and brevetted temporarily to the rank of lieutenant colonel. During the American Civil War, he served in command of artillery batteries at various forts and was eventually placed in command of the 4th United States Artillery Regiment with the rank of colonel. At the close of the civil war, he was awarded the honorary grade of brevet brigadier general. He continued his career as a soldier after the Civil War, remaining in command of the 4th U.S. Artillery until his retirement in 1877.

== Early service ==
Born in Boston, Brooks was sponsored in his early military career by the Marquis de Lafayette who was a friend of the family of his mother, poet Maria Gowen Brooks. Nominated by Lafayette, Brooks entered West Point on July 1, 1831 and graduated in 1835. He was appointed second lieutenant and assigned to the 2nd United States Artillery Regiment. Just months after graduating, Brooks saw combat when his regiment was deployed to Florida during the Second Seminole War. As part of a small force under the command of Brig. Gen. Duncan Lamont Clinch, Brooks participated in the Battle of Withlacoochee against the Seminole during which he was commended by Clinch for his bravery. Following this action, Brooks served as Clinch's adjutant and was brevetted first lieutenant for his service.

Brooks served in the Mexican–American War from 1846 to 1848, achieving the official rank of captain and the brevet rank of lieutenant colonel. During the years leading up to the Civil War, he was in command of the light battery school at Fort Leavenworth in Kansas.

== Civil War ==
In February 1861, with hostilities increasing and the prospect of Civil War imminent, Capt. Brooks's battery was transferred to Fort McHenry in Baltimore. He played an important role in readying the Fort for combat. In April, he was sent to Fort Pickens which was, at that time, threatened by Confederate forces. In November 1861, the Trent Affair increased tensions between the United States and Great Britain and Brooks was transferred to Fort Jefferson in the Florida Keys to prepare for possible attack by the British. During 1861, Brooks was promoted twice, attaining the rank of lieutenant colonel by the end of the year.

In 1862, Brooks became a superintendent of the recruiting service and was transferred to Ohio. On August 1, 1863, he was promoted to colonel and placed in command of the 4th U.S. Artillery Regiment. The regiment was assigned to the defenses of Washington, D.C. Brooks played a significant role in planning the overall defenses of the capitol.

For meritorious service during the war, he was brevetted brigadier general, U.S. Army (Regular Army), by nomination of President of the United States Andrew Johnson on June 30, 1866 and confirmation by the U.S. Senate on July 25, 1866, to rank from March 13, 1865.

== Post-Civil War career ==
Brooks remained in command of the 4th U.S. Artillery Regiment after the Civil War. From 1872 to 1877 he commanded the Presidio of San Francisco. In 1877, Brooks retired after 46 years of active service in the army.

== See also ==
- List of Massachusetts generals in the American Civil War
- Massachusetts in the American Civil War
