= Joe Brooks (baseball) =

- Pitcher
- Batted: Unknown Threw: Unknown

Negro league baseball debut
- 1942, for the Memphis Red Sox

Last appearance
- 1942, for the Memphis Red Sox
- Stats at Baseball Reference

Teams
- Memphis Red Sox (1942)

Joe Brooks was an American professional baseball pitcher in the Negro leagues. He played with the Memphis Red Sox in 1942.
