= The Monitor (Kansas City) =

Former newspaper in Kansas and Missouri, U.S.

- Type: Monthly
- Format: Tabloid
- Owner(s): Citizen Publications, LLC
- Publisher: Greg Brooks
- Managing editor: Greg Lipford
- Founded: 2011
- Ceased publication: 2011
- Language: English
- Headquarters: 800 W. Clay Ave. Plattsburg, Missouri 64477, USA
- Circulation: 15,000 (as of February 2011)
- Price: Free
- Website: http://kcmonitor.com

The Citizen was the original name of a free monthly newspaper distributed in the Kansas City Metropolitan Area and renamed in May 2011 to The Monitor. The paper covers state politics in Jefferson City, Missouri and Topeka, Kansas, as well as regional issues in Cass County, Missouri, Clay County, Missouri, Jackson County, Missouri, Platte County, Missouri, Johnson County, Kansas and Wyandotte County, Kansas.

The Monitor produces a mix of News and Opinion journalism, openly declaring a Center-right bias. Regular contributors include the Show-Me Institute, based in St. Louis, Missouri, and the Kansas Policy Institute, based in Wichita, Kansas. Both are free-market Think tanks focused on state policy issues.

The Monitor was started in February 2011. Citizen Publications, LLC owns the paper. It ceased publication in September 2011.

== Staff ==
- Publisher - Greg Brooks
- Managing Editor - Greg Lipford
