= Vincent Brooks =

Vincent Brooks may refer to:

- Vincent K. Brooks (born 1958), American military officer
- Vincent Brooks, Victorian era painter and owner of the lithography firm Vincent Brooks, Day & Son
- Vincent Brooks, protagonist of Catherine
