= Gordon Brooks =

Gordon Brooks may refer to:

- Gordon Brooks (cricketer) (1938–2004), Australian cricketer
- Gordon Brooks (photographer) (1939–2021), Barbadian photographer, photojournalist, cricket journalist and newspaper director
- Gord Brooks (1950–2020), Canadian ice hockey right winger
