= Mark Brooks =

Mark Brooks may refer to:

- Mark Brooks (golfer) (born 1961), American professional golfer
- Mark Brooks (comics) (born 1973), American comic book artist
- Mark Brooks (director) (born 1970), American producer, director, and musician
- Mark Brooks, chairman of domestic violence charity the ManKind Initiative
