= Joe Brooks (footballer, born 1885) =

English footballer

Personal information
- Full name: Joseph Brooks
- Date of birth: 23 November 1885
- Place of birth: Stairfoot, England
- Date of death: 1944 (aged 63–64)
- Position: Winger

Senior career*
Years	Team	Apps	(Gls)
1903–1904	Ardsley Nelson		
1904–1907	Barnsley	42	(7)
1907–1908	West Bromwich Albion	21	(1)
1908–1909	Barnsley	4	(0)
1909–1910	Rotherham County		
Total		67	(8)
- * Club domestic league appearances and goals

Joseph Brooks (23 November 1885–1944) was an English footballer who played in the Football League for Barnsley and West Bromwich Albion.
