= Colin Brooks (disambiguation) =

Colin Brooks (born 1970) is an Australian politician.

Colin Brooks may also refer to:

- Colin Brooks (drummer), American drummer for The Big Cats
- Colin Brooks, former vocalist/guitarist for Band of Heathens

== See also ==
- Collin Brooks (1893–1959), British journalist, writer, and broadcaster
