= Nan Brooks =

American artist (1935–2018)

Nan Brooks (January 15, 1935 – February 25, 2018), also known as Nancy Florence Earl-Brooks, was an American children's book illustrator who illustrated numerous books from the 1970s onwards. Brooks grew up in Cape May, New Jersey, and studied advertising design in Philadelphia. After graduation, she soon moved on to freelance illustration. Her colorful style was partly influenced by her interest in the Eastern religions. Her most successful work is her contribution to the Little Golden Books, The Princess and the Pea. Two of her later successful works are As I Kneel by Bonnie Knopf, and Making Minestrone by Stella Blackstone. Brooks died on February 25, 2018, at the age of 83.
