= Larry Brooks =

Larry Brooks may refer to:

- Larry Brooks (American football) (born 1950), American football defensive tackle
- Larry Brooks (journalist) (1950–2025), American sports journalist

== See also ==
- Lawrence Brooks (1912–1994), American singer and actor
- Lawrence Brooks (American veteran) (1909–2022), African-American veteran of the United States Army
