= Vernon King =

American politician

Member of the U.S. House of Representatives from Missouri's 16th district

Missouri House of Representatives
- In office 1973–unknown

Personal details
- Born: 1923 Ray County, Missouri, US
- Died: 2017 (aged 93–94) Kansas City, Missouri, US
- Party: Democratic
- Spouse: Ruth Marriott
- Children: 3 (2 sons, 1 daughter)

Vernon Cordell King (October 20, 1923 - February 14, 2017) was an American Democratic politician who served in the Missouri House of Representatives. He was born in Ray County, Missouri, on a farm near Lawson and Vibbard. He was educated at Ray County public schools, Central Missouri State University, and the University of Missouri-Columbia. He married Ruth Marriott at Excelsior Springs, Missouri. He also served in the United States Army as a tank commander during the Battle of the Bulge. He received three purple hearts during the war.
