= David Brooks (inventor) =

American inventor (fl. 1860s)

David Brooks was an American inventor from Philadelphia, Pennsylvania, remembered for an innovative insulator for telegraph lines in 1864 and 1867. He patented it while working for the Central Pacific Railroad. His patents allowed the railroad to more easily communicate with construction crews building the first transcontinental railroad in America.

The insulator had a thick metal casing around blown glass; the assembly was held together with molten sulfur. Out of the tube extends a "ramshorn" rod that held the telegraph wires. It was mounted into holes drilled into the bottom of wooden crossarms attached to poles.

Prior to the invention, Brooks worked for the Pennsylvania Railroad, which in the 1850s received permission to build its own telegraph line, having bought necessary patents. Brooks was the railroad's first superintendent of telegraphs, appointed in 1852.
