= Alfred Leroy Brooks =

American politician (1858–1927)

Alfred LeRoy Brooks (6 June 1858 – 5 January 1927) was an American medical doctor and politician from Iowa.

Brooks was born in Vinton, Iowa, on 6 June 1858. He attended Blairstown Academy and funded his studies at Rush Medical College by working as a farmhand and schoolteacher. Upon completing his medical education in 1883, Brooks became a country doctor based in Gray, Iowa. Brooks relocated to Audubon in 1888, and maintained his medical practice until 1926. He was a founding member of the Iowa Tuberculosis Association, established in 1915, and held executive positions within the organization. Brooks was also associated with the Audubon County Medical Society, the Iowa State Medical Society and the American Medical Association. Brooks was active in several fraternal orders, including Freemasonry and the Knights of Pythias. He attended the Methodist Episcopal Church.

Politically, Brooks was affiliated with the Republican Party, and served as Audubon County coroner, school board member, and state representative. He held the District 34 seat between 1892 and 1894.

Brooks was married twice. He wedded Atlantic, Iowa, native May Belle Langworth on 11 November 1887. One of the couple's three children, a daughter, survived to adulthood. After Langworth died on 26 December 1898, Brooks married Caldona Young of Jefferson, Iowa, on 2 June 1901. This second marriage produced a daughter and a son. Young died in June 1924. Brooks fell ill in 1926 and moved to Des Moines, Iowa, to live with his daughter and son-in-law. He died at their residence of peritonitis on 5 January 1927.
