= Jason Brooks (painter) =

British painter and sculptor

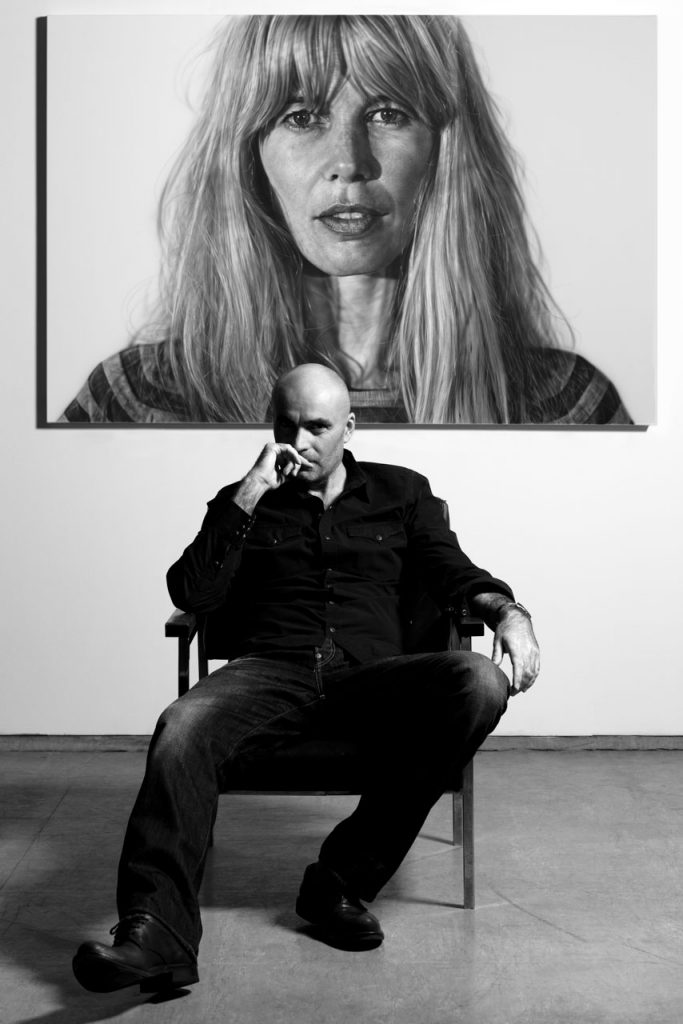
- Born: Rotherham, 1968
- Education: Goldsmiths College, Cheltenham Art School, Chelsea School of Art and Design
- Known for: Painting, Sculpture
- Website: https://www.jasonbrooks.com

Jason Brooks is a British painter and sculptor. He studied at Goldsmiths College before completing his BA at the Cheltenham & Gloucester College of Art & Design. Jason spent some time in the British School of Rome in 1990, then going on to receive his MA from the Chelsea College of Art & Design, London in 1992. He debuted among the YBAs in the 1990s with his black and white portraits. He won the NatWest art prize in 1999. Brooks judged the NPG Portrait Prize, John Moores Prize and the Jerwood Prize and has gone on to exhibit globally since then. His work is held in private and public collections all around the world, including the National Portrait Gallery Collection, London. A major overview of the artist’s work entitled Perpetual Orgy was published in 2015 to coincide with his solo show, 'Origins', at Marlborough London.

== Shows ==
Brooks had his first one-man exhibition at the Entwistle Gallery in London in 1998. Since then he has shown regularly both in the UK and abroad, including a solo show at the National Portrait Gallery, London in 2008 of portraits, including Sir Paul Nurse, among others. Brooks is currently represented by Marlborough London, with his inaugural show at the gallery in 2013, entitled Ultraflesh. In 2015 Brooks' exhibition Origins brought together different techniques used throughout his career to create 8 paintings that drew initial influence from Gustave Courbet's 1886 painting L'Origine du monde.

== Collections ==
Brooks’ work is represented private and public collections worldwide, including the National Portrait Gallery in London, the Walker Art Gallery in Liverpool, and the Saatchi Collection, London.
