= Ramy Brooks =

Alaska Native dog musher, kennel owner, and motivational speaker

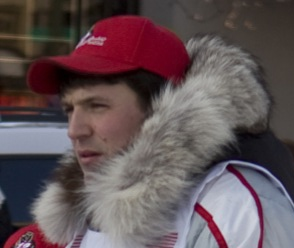
Ramy Brooks at the 2006 Iditarod

Ramy "Ray" Brooks (born December 24, 1968 in Fairbanks, Alaska) is an Alaska Native kennel owner and operator, motivational speaker, and dog musher who specializes in long-distance races. He is a two-time runner up in the 1,049+ mi (1,600+ km) Iditarod Trail Sled Dog Race across the U.S. state of Alaska, and a former winner of the 1,000 mi (1,600 km) Yukon Quest dog sled race across both Canada and the U.S.

== Family ==
Brooks is Yup'ik and Athabascan, two of the Indigenous groups who were the first to mush dogs in Alaska. His grandfather, Gareth Wright, was a competitive musher who won both major Alaskan sled dog races of the 1940s, the American Championship (twice), and the Fur Rendezvous World Championship (three times). Wright was also a dog breeder and kennel owner who became known for breeding the Wright's Aurora Husky from the Irish Setter, the St. Lawrence Siberian Husky, and village dogs.

Brooks's mother is Roxy Wright (or Wright-Champaine), another kennel owner and competitive musher. She became the first woman to win both the Fur Rendezvous World Championship in Anchorage, Alaska, and the Open North American Championship in Fairbanks. She won the open class of each event three times, and the women's classes eight times apiece. In 1990, she also won Europe's largest dog sled race, the Alpirod, across Italy, Austria, and France. She was also honored with the Mush with PRIDE Lifetime Achievement Award in 1996, and once competed in the Iditarod.

Brooks's maternal aunt is Shannon Erhart, who competes in sprint races. She placed third in the Women's Fur Rondezvous race in 2000, and has also raced in the Open Fur Rondezvous. Her ex-husband Curtis Erhart has raced in the Kuskokwim 300.

== Personal history ==
Brooks was raised in a Yukon River fish camp in the Fairbanks and Rampart areas. During the summer he operated a fishwheel, and during the winter he mushed the family dogs. After high school he joined the U.S. Navy then went to the University of Washington before returning to Alaska and married his wife, Cathy. His wife was raised in a dairy farm in Pennsylvania and attended Penn State, but moved to Alaska where she is employed by the University of Alaska Fairbanks and works as the 4-H youth development specialist for the Alaska. Originally they lived in Fairbanks, but moved briefly to Delta Junction, Alaska, then Eureka, Alaska, in 1997, before settling in Healy, Alaska by 1999. They have two young daughters, Abbigal and Molly. The cabin they lived in at Eureka was owned by former Iditarod champion Susan Butcher. He and his family are currently living on Murphy Dome Road in Fairbanks Alaska. They still own the 50-acre (200,000 m^{2}) kennel in Healy.

The family owns and operates Kami Kennels, primarily composed of Alaskan Huskies. Kami is a respectful Japanese term for sacred spirits, and Brooks chose the name to symbolize the importance of his family. Brooks has visited schools as a motivational speaker since 1993, participates in Mush for Kids since 1997, and from 2003 has been a trustee of the Alaskan Children's Trust.

He attempted to commit suicide at age 16, and suffered from depression in his 20s. As a result, he began working with the Alaska Mental Health Trust in 2005, in an attempt to reduce the extraordinarily high rate of suicide among Native Alaskans.

== Racing ==
Iditarod Finishes
Year	Position	Time (h:min:s)
1994	17th	11 days, 15:41:30
1995	16th	10 days, 14:08:00
1996	11th	10 days, 02:56:00
1997	8th	9 days, 21:51:09
1998	18th	10 days, 14:09:03
2000	4th	9 days, 09:20:30
2001	12th	11 days, 20:47:05
2002	2nd	9 days, 00:49:18
2003	2nd	9 days, 17:37:10
2004	8th	9 days, 19:58:09
2005	5th	9 days, 21:30:00
2006	31st	10 days, 19:10:26
2007	DQ	Disqualified

Brooks won his first race, the single-dog Junior North American Championship, when he was four years old, with his dog Sam. He went on to become the first person to win the race three times in a row, and by 14 years of age he had won every class in the race. He started competing in long distance races in 1992 and 1993.

Brooks placed 17th in his first Iditarod, in 1994, and won the Rookie of the Year Award. He consistently improved his ranking for the next three years, breaking into the top 10 in 1997 with an 8th-place finish. After two family deaths less than 10 days before the 1998 race and recurrent dog problems, he completed his worst finish in 1998. In 2000, he returned and has consistently placed in the top 10, with his best a back-to-back pair of 2nd-place finishes in 2002 and 2003. In 1998, he won the drawing for the Joe Redington, Sr. Award, and in 2000 he won both the Sportsmanship and Most Improved Musher Awards.

Brooks is one of the few Alaskan Natives competing in the modern Iditarod, which is a considerable change from the early days of the Iditarod. In 1976, more than one quarter of the entrants, including the record-breaking Emmitt Peters, were of native descent. The most common reason given for this paucity is the expense of the training and equipping a competitive team. Rural Alaskans find it difficult to acquire the necessary sponsors.

Other Racing Achievements
Year	Race	Achievement
1993	Yukon Quest	15th place (12 days, 21 h, 50 min)
1994	Iditarod	Rookie of the Year
1996	Henry Hahn 200	1st place
1996	Kuskokwim 300	4th place
1996	Kuskokwim 300	Eddie Hoffman Humanitarian Award
1998	Iditarod	Joe Redington Sr. Award
1999	Yukon Quest	1st (11 days, 8 h, 27 min)
1999	Yukon Quest	Dawson Award (1st to Dawson City)
1999	Yukon Quest	Kiwanis Award (1st to cross border)
1999	Yukon Quest	Mayor's Award (to winner)
1999	Yukon Quest	Golden Harness (winning lead dog)
2000	Iditarod	Sportsmanship
2000	Iditarod	Most Improved Musher

In 1993, he placed 15th in 1,000 mi (1,600 km) Yukon Quest dog sled race. In 1999, he won the race from Fairbanks, Alaska, to Whitehorse, Yukon, with a time of 11 days, 7 hours, and 31 minutes. His 1999 win was accompanied by the Dawson Award for being the first musher into Dawson City, Yukon, winning 4 oz of gold, the Kiwanis Award for being the first to cross the United States-Canada border, and the Major's Award for winning. His lead dog, Pretty Boy, won the Golden Harness.

Brooks has also raced in the Kuskokwim 300, Copper Basin 300, Tour de Minto, Fire Plug Stakes, Sheep Creek Classic, and Henry Hahn 200. He won the Henry Han 200 in 1996, and placed 4th in the Kuskokwim 300 in the same year (also winning the Eddie Hoffman Humanitarian Award), but his primary goal is to win the Iditarod. According to Brooks, "living my dream and the love of working with my dogs", is the reason he races.

== Iditarod disqualification and suspension ==
During the 2007 Iditarod, witnesses said they saw Brooks punch and kick some of his dogs and hit them with a ski pole when they refused to leave a checkpoint during a March 15, 2007, stage in Golovin, Alaska, less than 100 miles (160 km) from the finish in Nome, Alaska. Brooks denies the more serious allegations, but acknowledged "spanking" the dogs in his team with a trail marking lath. One of Brooks‘ dogs died the day after the incident, but a necropsy could not determine why the dog died and race officials said there was no evidence that Brooks was to blame. On March 17, 2007, the judges voted unanimously to disqualify Brooks from the 2007 Iditarod.

On May 18, 2007, the Iditarod Trail Committee Board of Directors announced that they had suspended Brooks for the 2008 and 2009 race, and following that, Brooks would be on probation for 3 years. Interviews of three adult and two child witnesses by an independent investigation team factored into the decision.
