= Edward Brook =

New Zealand cricket umpire

Personal information
- Born: 31 May 1895; Christchurch, New Zealand
- Died: 5 November 1954 (aged 59); Christchurch, New Zealand

Umpiring information
- Tests umpired: 1 (1954)
- Source: Cricinfo, 1 July 2013

Edward Brook (31 May 1895 – 5 November 1954) was a New Zealand cricket umpire. He stood in one Test match, New Zealand vs. England, in 1954.

== See also ==
- List of Test cricket umpires
- English cricket team in New Zealand in 1950–51
