= Stuart M. Brooks =

American pulmonary doctor

Stuart Merrill Brooks is an American pulmonary doctor who is credited for discovering and researching Reactive Airways Dysfunction Syndrome (RADS) to describe an asthma-like syndrome developing after a single exposure to high levels of an irritating vapor, fume, or smoke. It involves coughing, wheezing, and dyspnea. Dr Brooks received the highest honor in occupational and environmental medicine, the Knudsen Award. This award recognizes an individual who has made outstanding contributions to the field. Dr Brooks was honored for his exemplary efforts in starting the first occupational medicine residency in Florida in 1982.

He currently practices in Tampa at the Greystone Professional Park, and is an Emeritus Professor at the University of South Florida, Tampa Fl.

He is married to Dena (Varney) Brooks and has 4 children.
