= Allette Brooks =

American singer

Allette Brooks is an American folk singer-songwriter from Long Beach, California. She graduated from Stanford University, majoring in human biology. Her song "Silicon Valley Rebel", about a feminist Web designer who "comes in to work every day in her bike shorts and political T-shirts", was featured in "Silicon Valley USA", a BBC radio documentary. She also teaches Forrest yoga and Restorative Yoga.

== Discography ==
- Privilege (1996)
- Silicon Valley Rebel (1999)
- Swim With Me (2001)
- Blaze (2008)
