= Sharon Sanders Brooks =

American politician

Sharon Sanders Brooks is a former American Democrat politician from Kansas City, Missouri, who served in the Missouri House of Representatives.

Born in Lynchburg, Virginia, she attended Francis L. Cardozo High School, Bennett College, and American University. She has worked as a historical consultant, a civil rights investigator, and a fair housing investigator.
