= Brook (surname) =

Brook is a surname. Notable people with the surname include:

- Abraham Brook (flourished 1789), English physicist and bookseller
- Andrew Brook (disambiguation)
- Basil Brook (1576 – c. 1646), English ironmaster, see Basil Brooke (metallurgist)
- Benjamin Brook (1776–1848), English nonconformist minister and religious historian
- Charles Brook (philanthropist) (1814–1872), English philanthropist
- Claudio Brook (1927–1995), Mexican actor
- Clive Brook (1887–1974), English actor
- David Brook (disambiguation)
- Eric Brook (1907–1965), English footballer
- Faith Brook (1922–2012), English actress
- George Brook (cricketer) (1888–1966), English cricketer
- George Brook (zoologist), British zoologist
- Gina Knee Brook (1898–1982), American painter
- Harry Brook (born 1999). English cricketer
- Helen Brook (1907–1997), British family planning adviser
- Holly Brook (born 1986), AKA Skylar Grey, American singer and songwriter
- Jayne Brook (born 1962), American actress
- Jordan Brook (born 1995), English television personality
- Kelly Brook (born 1979), English model
- Michael Brook (born 1951), Canadian guitarist, inventor, producer, and film music composer
- Norman Brook, 1st Baron Normanbrook (1902–1967), British civil servant.
- Peter Brook (1925–2022), English theatre and film director and innovator
- Rhidian Brook (born 1964), British novelist, screenwriter and broadcaster
- Richard Brook (chief executive), English executive
- Timothy Brook (born 1951), Canadian historian
- Tom Brook (born 1953), BBC World presenter
- William Broke or Brook, English 16th-century college and university head
- Yaron Brook (born 1961), Israeli-American entrepreneur and writer

== See also ==
- Brooks (surname)
