= Andrew Brooks (disambiguation) =

Andrew Brooks (1969–2021) was an American immunologist, academic, and businessman, known for developing a COVID-19 saliva test.

Andrew Brooks or Brookes may also refer to:

- Andrew Brookes, English aerospace analyst and author
- Andrew Brookes (cricketer) (born 1969), English cricketer
- Andy Brooks, British politician

== See also ==
- Andrew Brook (disambiguation)
- Andrew Brooke, English producer and actor
