= New Jersey's 12th congressional district =

U.S. House district for New Jersey

Coordinates: 40°19′25″N 74°32′32″W

- Interactive map of district boundaries since January 3, 2023
- Representative: Bonnie Watson Coleman; D–Ewing Township
- Distribution: 97.6% urban; 2.4% rural
- Population (2025): 791,288
- Median household income: $114,353
- Ethnicity: 39.8% White; 21.5% Hispanic; 19.4% Asian; 15.6% Black; 2.8% Two or more races; 0.8% other
- Cook PVI: D+13

New Jersey's 12th congressional district is a congressional district located in central New Jersey and includes Mercer, Somerset, Union, and Middlesex counties, the state capital of Trenton, and the city of Plainfield. It is known for its many research centers and educational institutions — Princeton University, The College of New Jersey, Institute for Advanced Study, Johnson & Johnson, and Bristol-Myers Squibb are all located in the district.

Democrat Bonnie Watson Coleman is the district's current representative until her retirement effective January 3, 2027. From then on, the district will be represented by Democrat Adam Hamawy, who succeeded her in the 2026 election.

== History ==
The 12th congressional district (together with the 11th district) was created starting with the 63rd United States Congress in 1913, based on redistricting following the 1910 United States census. In 1925, Mary Teresa Norton was elected to the district and became the first female Democrat in the United States Congress.

Historically, the district had been competitive between the two main parties until redistricting following the 2000 United States census gave Democrats an electoral advantage. Since then, the district has encompassed the heavily Democratic municipalities of Princeton, Trenton, and Plainfield and is solidly Democratic as measured by the Cook PVI.

Redistricting in 2000 made second-term Democrat Rush D. Holt Jr. considerably more secure; he had narrowly defeated freshman Republican Michael Pappas in 1998, and had won against Dick Zimmer who represented the district from 1991 to 1997, by only 651 votes in 2000. Despite an expensive 2002 challenge from former New Jersey Secretary of State Buster Soaries, Holt was re-elected with 61% of the vote.

Democrats in the district found themselves at an even larger advantage following 2010 redistricting, as Republican-leaning Hunterdon County and Monmouth County were removed from the district and portions of strongly Democratic Middlesex County, Union County, and Mercer County were drawn into it.

Holt retired in 2014 and was succeeded by State Assembly Majority Leader Bonnie Watson Coleman, making her the first African-American woman elected to Congress from New Jersey. Following Watson Coleman's retirement, Adam Hamawy was elected as her successor, making him the first Muslim elected to Congress from New Jersey. He takes office on January 20, 2027.

== Counties and municipalities in the district ==
For the 118th and successive Congresses (based on redistricting following the 2020 census), the district contains all or portions of four counties and 32 municipalities.

Mercer County (7)

Ewing Township, Hopewell, Hopewell Township, Pennington, Princeton, Trenton, West Windsor

Middlesex County (14)

Cranbury, Dunellen, East Brunswick, Helmetta, Jamesburg, Middlesex, Milltown, Monroe Township, North Brunswick, Old Bridge Township (part, also 6th; includes Brownville and Old Bridge CDP), Plainsboro Township, South Brunswick, South River, Spotswood

Somerset County (10)

Bound Brook, Bridgewater Township (part, also in 7th), Hillsborough Township (part, also 7th; includes Blackwells Mills, Hillsborough CDP, and part of Belle Mead and Flagtown), Franklin Township, Manville, Millstone, Montgomery Township, North Plainfield, Rocky Hill, South Bound Brook

Union County (1)

Plainfield

== Recent election results from statewide races ==
| Year | Office | Results |
|---|---|---|
| 2008 | President | Obama 65% - 34% |
| 2012 | President | Obama 66% - 34% |
| 2016 | President | Clinton 64% - 33% |
| 2017 | Governor | Murphy 61% - 36% |
| 2018 | Senate | Menendez 62% - 35% |
| 2020 | President | Biden 67% - 32% |
| 2020 | Senate | Booker 65% - 33% |
| 2021 | Governor | Murphy 61% - 38% |
| 2024 | President | Harris 61% - 37% |
| 2024 | Senate | Kim 62% - 35% |
| 2025 | Governor | Sherrill 67% - 32% |

== List of members representing the district ==
| Member (District Home) | Party | Years | Cong ress | Electoral history | Counties/Towns |
|---|---|---|---|---|---|
District established March 4, 1913
| James A. Hamill (Jersey City) | Democratic | March 4, 1913 – March 3, 1921 | 63rd 64th 65th 66th | Redistricted from the 10th district and re-elected in 1912. Re-elected in 1914. Re-elected in 1916. Re-elected in 1918. Retired. | 1913–1933; Parts of Jersey City |
| Charles F. X. O'Brien (Jersey City) | Democratic | March 4, 1921 – March 3, 1925 | 67th 68th | Elected in 1920. Re-elected in 1922. Retired to become registrar of records of Hudson County. | 1913–1933; Parts of Jersey City |
| Mary Teresa Norton (Jersey City) | Democratic | March 4, 1925 – March 3, 1933 | 69th 70th 71st 72nd | Elected in 1924. Re-elected in 1926. Re-elected in 1928. Re-elected in 1930. Redistricted to the 13th district. | 1913–1933; Parts of Jersey City |
| Frederick R. Lehlbach (Newark) | Republican | March 4, 1933 – January 3, 1937 | 73rd 74th | Redistricted from the 10th district and re-elected in 1932. Re-elected in 1934. Lost re-election. | 1933–1967; Parts of Essex |
| Frank William Towey Jr. (Caldwell) | Democratic | January 3, 1937 – January 3, 1939 | 75th | Elected in 1936. Lost re-election. | 1933–1967; Parts of Essex |
| Robert Kean (Livingston) | Republican | January 3, 1939 – January 3, 1959 | 76th 77th 78th 79th 80th 81st 82nd 83rd 84th 85th | Elected in 1938. Re-elected in 1940. Re-elected in 1942. Re-elected in 1944. Re-elected in 1946. Re-elected in 1948. Re-elected in 1950. Re-elected in 1952. Re-elected in 1954. Re-elected in 1956. Retired to run for U.S. senator. | 1933–1967; Parts of Essex |
| George M. Wallhauser (Maplewood) | Republican | January 3, 1959 – January 3, 1965 | 86th 87th 88th | Elected in 1958. Re-elected in 1960. Re-elected in 1962. Retired. | 1933–1967; Parts of Essex |
| Paul J. Krebs (Livingston) | Democratic | January 3, 1965 – January 3, 1967 | 89th | Elected in 1964. Retired. | 1933–1967; Parts of Essex |
| Florence P. Dwyer (Elizabeth) | Republican | January 3, 1967 – January 3, 1973 | 90th 91st 92nd | Redistricted from the 6th district and re-elected in 1966. Re-elected in 1968. Re-elected in 1970. Retired. | 1967–1973; Parts of Essex and Union |
| Matthew John Rinaldo (Union Township) | Republican | January 3, 1973 – January 3, 1983 | 93rd 94th 95th 96th 97th | Elected in 1972. Re-elected in 1974. Re-elected in 1976. Re-elected in 1978. Re-elected in 1980. Redistricted to the 7th district. | 1973–1983; Parts of Union |
| Jim Courter (Hackettstown) | Republican | January 3, 1983 – January 3, 1991 | 98th 99th 100th 101st | Redistricted from the 13th district and re-elected in 1982. Re-elected in 1984. Re-elected in 1986. Re-elected in 1988. Retired. | 1983–1985; Parts of Hunterdon, Morris, Somerset, Sussex, Union, and Warren |
| Jim Courter (Hackettstown) | Republican | January 3, 1983 – January 3, 1991 | 98th 99th 100th 101st | Redistricted from the 13th district and re-elected in 1982. Re-elected in 1984. Re-elected in 1986. Re-elected in 1988. Retired. | 1985–1993; Hunterdon and parts of Mercer (Princeton and West Windsor), Middlesex, Morris, Somerset, Sussex, and Warren |
| Dick Zimmer (Delaware) | Republican | January 3, 1991 – January 3, 1997 | 102nd 103rd 104th | Elected in 1990. Re-elected in 1992. Re-elected in 1994. Retired to run for U.S. senator. | 1985–1993; Hunterdon and parts of Mercer (Princeton and West Windsor), Middlesex, Morris, Somerset, Sussex, and Warren |
| Dick Zimmer (Delaware) | Republican | January 3, 1991 – January 3, 1997 | 102nd 103rd 104th | Elected in 1990. Re-elected in 1992. Re-elected in 1994. Retired to run for U.S. senator. | 1993–2003; Parts of Hunterdon, Mercer, Middlesex, Monmouth, and Somerset |
| Mike Pappas (Rocky Hill) | Republican | January 3, 1997 – January 3, 1999 | 105th | Elected in 1996. Lost re-election. | 1993–2003; Parts of Hunterdon, Mercer, Middlesex, Monmouth, and Somerset |
| Rush D. Holt Jr. (Hopewell Township) | Democratic | January 3, 1999 – January 3, 2015 | 106th 107th 108th 109th 110th 111th 112th 113th | Elected in 1998. Re-elected in 2000. Re-elected in 2002. Re-elected in 2004. Re-elected in 2006. Re-elected in 2008. Re-elected in 2010. Re-elected in 2012. Retired. | 1993–2003; Parts of Hunterdon, Mercer, Middlesex, Monmouth, and Somerset |
| Rush D. Holt Jr. (Hopewell Township) | Democratic | January 3, 1999 – January 3, 2015 | 106th 107th 108th 109th 110th 111th 112th 113th | Elected in 1998. Re-elected in 2000. Re-elected in 2002. Re-elected in 2004. Re-elected in 2006. Re-elected in 2008. Re-elected in 2010. Re-elected in 2012. Retired. | 2003–2013 Parts of Hunterdon, Mercer, Middlesex, Monmouth, and Somerset |
| Rush D. Holt Jr. (Hopewell Township) | Democratic | January 3, 1999 – January 3, 2015 | 106th 107th 108th 109th 110th 111th 112th 113th | Elected in 1998. Re-elected in 2000. Re-elected in 2002. Re-elected in 2004. Re-elected in 2006. Re-elected in 2008. Re-elected in 2010. Re-elected in 2012. Retired. | 2013–2023 Mercer (except Hamilton and Robbinsville), Middlesex (Cranbury, Dunellen, East Brunswick, Helmetta, Jamesburg, Middlesex, Milltown, Monroe, North Brunswick, Plainsboro, South Brunswick, South River, and Spotswood), Somerset (Bound Brook, Franklin Township, Manville and South Bound Brook), and Union (Fanwood, Plainfield, and part of Scotch Plains) |
| Bonnie Watson Coleman (Ewing Township) | Democratic | January 3, 2015 – present | 114th 115th 116th 117th 118th 119th | Elected in 2014. Re-elected in 2016. Re-elected in 2018. Re-elected in 2020. Re-elected in 2022. Re-elected in 2024. Retiring at the end of term. | 2013–2023 Mercer (except Hamilton and Robbinsville), Middlesex (Cranbury, Dunellen, East Brunswick, Helmetta, Jamesburg, Middlesex, Milltown, Monroe, North Brunswick, Plainsboro, South Brunswick, South River, and Spotswood), Somerset (Bound Brook, Franklin Township, Manville and South Bound Brook), and Union (Fanwood, Plainfield, and part of Scotch Plains) |
| Bonnie Watson Coleman (Ewing Township) | Democratic | January 3, 2015 – present | 114th 115th 116th 117th 118th 119th | Elected in 2014. Re-elected in 2016. Re-elected in 2018. Re-elected in 2020. Re-elected in 2022. Re-elected in 2024. Retiring at the end of term. | 2023–present: Parts of Mercer, Middlesex, Somerset, and Union (Plainfield) |
| Adam Hamawy (Monmouth Junction) | Democratic | Assuming office on January 3, 2027 | | Elected in 2026. | 2023–present: Parts of Mercer, Middlesex, Somerset, and Union (Plainfield) |

== Recent election results ==
=== 2012 ===
New Jersey's 12th congressional district, 2012
| Party | Candidate | Votes | % |
|---|---|---|---|
| Democratic | Rush Holt (incumbent) | 189,938 | 69.2 |
| Republican | Eric Beck | 80,907 | 29.5 |
| Independent | Jack Freudenheim | 2,261 | 0.8 |
| Independent | Kenneth J. Cody | 1,285 | 0.5 |
| Total votes | | 274,391 | 100.0 |
| Democratic hold | | | |

=== 2014 ===
New Jersey's 12th congressional district, 2014
| Party | Candidate | Votes | % |
|---|---|---|---|
| Democratic | Bonnie Watson Coleman | 90,430 | 60.9 |
| Republican | Alieta Eck | 54,168 | 36.5 |
| Independent | Don Dezarn | 1,330 | 0.9 |
| Green | Steven Welzer | 890 | 0.6 |
| Independent | Kenneth J. Cody | 567 | 0.4 |
| Independent | Jack Freudenheim | 531 | 0.4 |
| Independent | Allen J. Cannon | 450 | 0.3 |
| Total votes | | 148,366 | 100.0 |
| Democratic hold | | | |

=== 2016 ===
New Jersey's 12th congressional district, 2016
| Party | Candidate | Votes | % |
|---|---|---|---|
| Democratic | Bonnie Watson Coleman (incumbent) | 181,430 | 62.9 |
| Republican | Steven J. Uccio | 92,407 | 32.0 |
| Independent | R. Edward Forchion | 6,094 | 2.1 |
| Independent | Robert Shapiro | 2,775 | 1.0 |
| Libertarian | Thomas Fitzpatrick | 2,482 | 0.9 |
| Green | Steven Welzer | 2,135 | 0.7 |
| Independent | Michael R. Bollentin | 1,311 | 0.4 |
| Total votes | | 288,634 | 100.0 |
| Democratic hold | | | |

=== 2018 ===
New Jersey's 12th congressional district, 2018
| Party | Candidate | Votes | % |
|---|---|---|---|
| Democratic | Bonnie Watson Coleman (incumbent) | 173,334 | 68.7 |
| Republican | Daryl Kipnis | 79,041 | 31.3 |
| Total votes | | 252,375 | 100.0 |
| Democratic hold | | | |

=== 2020 ===
New Jersey's 12th congressional district, 2020
| Party | Candidate | Votes | % |
|---|---|---|---|
| Democratic | Bonnie Watson Coleman (incumbent) | 230,883 | 65.6 |
| Republican | Mark Razzoli | 114,591 | 32.6 |
| Independent | Ed Forchion | 4,512 | 1.3 |
| Independent | Ken Cody | 1,739 | 0.5 |
| Total votes | | 351,725 | 100.0 |
| Democratic hold | | | |

=== 2022 ===
New Jersey's 12th congressional district, 2022
| Party | Candidate | Votes | % |
|---|---|---|---|
| Democratic | Bonnie Watson Coleman (incumbent) | 125,127 | 63.1 |
| Republican | Darius Mayfield | 71,175 | 35.9 |
| Libertarian | Lynn Genrich | 1,925 | 1.0 |
| Total votes | | 198,227 | 100.0 |
| Democratic hold | | | |

=== 2024 ===
New Jersey's 12th congressional district, 2024
| Party | Candidate | Votes | % |
|---|---|---|---|
| Democratic | Bonnie Watson Coleman (incumbent) | 196,871 | 61.2 |
| Republican | Darius Mayfield | 117,222 | 36.4 |
| Green | Kim Meudt | 4,652 | 1.5 |
| Libertarian | Vic Kaplan | 2,915 | 0.9 |
| Total votes | | 321,660 | 100.0 |
| Democratic hold | | | |
