= Donna Simpson =

Donna Simpson may refer to:

- Donna Simpson (internet celebrity) (born 1967), American internet celebrity
- Donna Simpson (musician) (born 1970), Australian musician
