= Old Bridge Township, New Jersey =

Township in Middlesex County, New Jersey, US

- Township
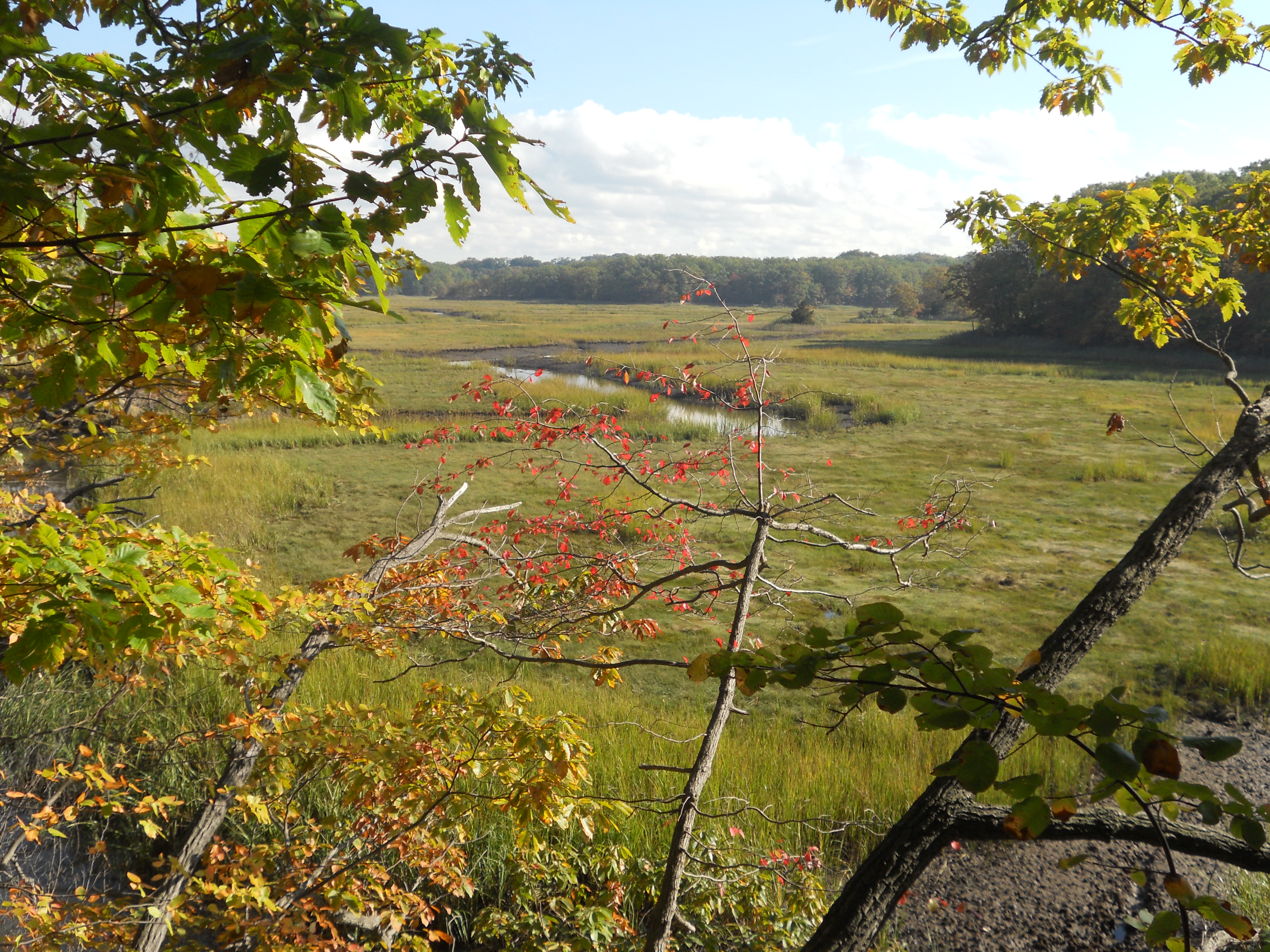
- Cheesequake State Park

- Seal

- Location of Old Bridge Township in Middlesex County highlighted in red (left). Inset map: Location of Middlesex County in New Jersey highlighted in orange (right).

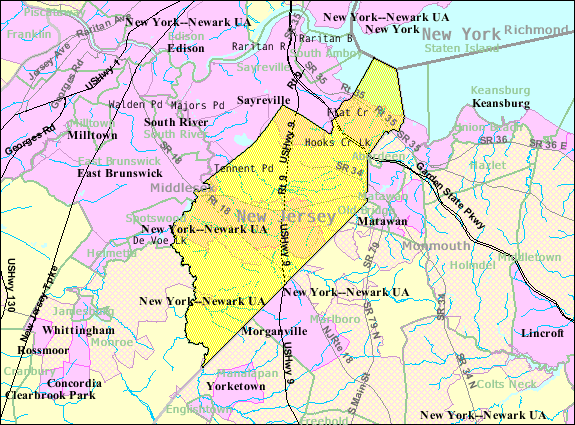
- Census Bureau map of Old Bridge Township, New Jersey
- Interactive map of Old Bridge Township, New Jersey
- Location in Middlesex County Location in New Jersey Location in the United States
- Coordinates: 40.404632°N 74.308537°W
- Country: United States
- State: New Jersey
- County: Middlesex
- Incorporated: March 2, 1869 (as Madison Township)
- Renamed: November 5, 1975 (as Old Bridge Township)

Government
  - Type: Faulkner Act Mayor-Council
  - Body: Township Council
  - Mayor: Eleanor "Debbie" Walker (R, term ends December 31, 2027)
  - Administrator: Himanshu Shah
  - Municipal clerk: Kathryn Hutchinson

Area
  - Total: 40.93 sq mi (106.00 km^{2})
  - Land: 38.18 sq mi (98.89 km^{2})
  - Water: 2.75 sq mi (7.11 km^{2}) 6.71%
  - Rank: 52nd of 565 in state 3rd of 25 in county
- Elevation: 46 ft (14 m)

Population (2020)
  - Total: 66,876
  - Estimate (2023): 68,165
  - Rank: 21st of 565 in state 3rd of 25 in county
  - Density: 1,751.6/sq mi (676.3/km^{2})
  - Rank: 314th of 565 in state 22nd of 25 in county
- Time zone: UTC−05:00 (Eastern (EST))
  - Summer (DST): UTC−04:00 (Eastern (EDT))
- ZIP Codes: 08857 – Old Bridge; 08859 – Parlin; 08879 – Laurence Harbor; 07735 – Cliffwood Beach; 07747 – Matawan*; 08879 – South Amboy*
- Area codes: 732/848
- FIPS code: 3402354705
- GNIS feature ID: 0882158
- Website: www.oldbridge.com

Old Bridge Township is a township in Middlesex County, in the U.S. state of New Jersey, located in the Raritan Valley Region and within the New York Metro Area. As of the 2020 United States census, the township was the state's 21st-most-populous municipality, with a population of 66,876, an increase of 1,501 (+2.3%) from the 2010 census count of 65,375, which in turn reflected an increase of 4,919 (+8.1%) from the 60,456 counted in the 2000 census. As of the 2010 Census, the township was ranked 18th in the state by population, after being the state's 21st most-populous municipality in 2000. The township is a bedroom suburb of New York City located across the Raritan Bay from Staten Island. It is about 25 miles (40 km) from New York City and about 30 miles (48 km) south of Newark.

What is now Old Bridge Township was originally incorporated as Madison Township by an act of the New Jersey Legislature on March 2, 1869, from portions of South Amboy Township (now City of South Amboy). In a referendum held on November 5, 1975, voters approved changing the township's name to Old Bridge Township by a margin of 7,150 votes to 4,888. The township's name was changed to avoid confusion with the borough of Madison in Morris County. When the township was established, the area was made up primarily of farms and the population grew slowly. In 1880, the population was 1,662 and by 1950 it had reached 7,365. Over the next decade, a building boom started; as farms gave way to developments, the population tripled to 22,772 by 1960. The 1980 census cited 51,406 people. The township saw major changes with the extension of Route 18 to the shore.

The township was named as a contender for the title of one of the best places to live in the United States by Money magazine in both 2005 and 2007.

In 2016, SafeWise named Old Bridge Township as the sixth-safest city in America to raise a child; the township was the second-highest ranked of the 12 communities in New Jersey included on the list.

== History ==
The first inhabitants of the area known as Old Bridge were the Lenni Lenape Native Americans. Those who settled in Old Bridge and other parts of Central Jersey were known as the Unami, or "people down the river." They migrated to the shore along the Raritan each summer from their hunting grounds in the north. When the English gained control from the Dutch in 1664, the state was divided into two provinces, East Jersey and West Jersey. In 1683, the general assembly of East Jersey defined the boundaries of Middlesex County and the three other original counties (Bergen, Essex and Monmouth) as containing all plantations on both sides of the Raritan River, as far as Cheesequake Harbor to the east, then southwest to the Provincial line, with the southwest line being the border of Monmouth and Middlesex counties and the Township's southern border.

Thomas Warne, one of the original 24 proprietors of East Jersey, was listed as a landowner of this area, and his son is said to have been the earliest European resident residing in the Cheesequake area in 1683. John and Susannah Brown were granted a 1,000 acres (4.0 km^{2}) land grant from the King of England in 1737. They called the area Brownville, and this part of township is still known as Browntown.

In 1684, South Amboy Township was formed. At that time, it covered an area that now consists of the Townships of Monroe and Old Bridge, the Borough of Sayreville and the City of South Amboy. The Township covers 42 square miles (110 km^{2}) that separated from South Amboy on March 2, 1869, and was originally called Madison Township. In 1975, the name was changed by referendum to the Township of Old Bridge. The purpose was to establish a single postal designation and ZIP code for the township and to differentiate the township from the Borough of Madison in Morris County. The community of Old Bridge in East Brunswick derives its name from the fact that the first bridge spanning the South River was built there, and as other bridges were built across the river the first one became known as "the Old Bridge."

== Geography ==
According to the United States Census Bureau, the township had a total area of 40.93 square miles (106.00 km^{2}), including 38.18 square miles (98.89 km^{2}) of land and 2.75 square miles (7.11 km^{2}) of water (6.71%).

Brownville (2020 population of 2,383), Laurence Harbor (6,635), Madison Park (8,050) and Old Bridge CDP (27,210) are unincorporated communities and census-designated places (CDPs) located within Old Bridge Township. Other unincorporated communities, localities and place names within Old Bridge Township include Browntown, Brunswick Gardens, Cheesequake, Cottrell Corners, Matchaponix, Moerls Corner, Morristown, Parlin, Redshaw Corner, Runyon, Sayre Woods South, South Old Bridge and Texas.

Old Bridge borders the municipalities of East Brunswick, Monroe Township, Sayreville and Spotswood in Middlesex County; Aberdeen, Manalapan, Marlboro and Matawan in Monmouth County; and shares a border with the borough of Staten Island in New York City, across the Raritan Bay.

=== Major streams/rivers ===
- Raritan Bay
- South River
- Matchaponix Brook
- Deep Run
- Tennets Brook
- Barclay Brook
- Cheesequake Creek

=== Climate ===
In previous decades the climate of Old Bridge was classified as hot-summer humid continental (Dfa) but according to the most recent temperature numbers it now has a humid subtropical climate (Cfa). The hardiness zones are 7a and 7b.

== Demographics ==
Historical population
Census	Pop.	Note	%±
1870	1,870		—
1880	1,662		−11.1%
1890	1,520		−8.5%
1900	1,671		9.9%
1910	1,621		−3.0%
1920	1,808		11.5%
1930	2,566		41.9%
1940	3,803		48.2%
1950	7,366		93.7%
1960	22,772		209.2%
1970	48,715		113.9%
1980	51,515		5.7%
1990	56,475		9.6%
2000	60,456		7.0%
2010	65,375		8.1%
2020	66,876		2.3%
2023 (est.)	68,165	▲	1.9%
Population sources: 1870–1920; 1870 1880–1890; 1890–1910 1910–1930; 1940–2000 2000; 2010 2020

=== 2010 census ===
The 2010 United States census counted 65,375 people, 23,777 households, and 17,333 families in the township. The population density was 1,717.7 per square mile (663.2/km^{2}). There were 24,638 housing units at an average density of 647.3 per square mile (249.9/km^{2}). The racial makeup was 74.06% (48,418) White, 6.21% (4,063) Black or African American, 0.20% (129) Native American, 14.34% (9,374) Asian, 0.02% (10) Pacific Islander, 2.72% (1,780) from other races, and 2.45% (1,601) from two or more races. Hispanic or Latino of any race were 10.81% (7,064) of the population.

Of the 23,777 households, 33.7% had children under the age of 18; 58.5% were married couples living together; 10.1% had a female householder with no husband present and 27.1% were non-families. Of all households, 22.6% were made up of individuals and 7.9% had someone living alone who was 65 years of age or older. The average household size was 2.73 and the average family size was 3.25.

22.8% of the population were under the age of 18, 7.8% from 18 to 24, 27.2% from 25 to 44, 30.1% from 45 to 64, and 12.1% who were 65 years of age or older. The median age was 40.1 years. For every 100 females, the population had 95.2 males. For every 100 females ages 18 and older there were 92.5 males.

The Census Bureau's 2006–2010 American Community Survey showed that (in 2010 inflation-adjusted dollars) median household income was $82,640 (with a margin of error of +/− $6,053) and the median family income was $98,634 (+/− $2,857). Males had a median income of $67,487 (+/− $3,364) versus $48,856 (+/− $3,104) for females. The per capita income for the township was $35,666 (+/− $1,152). About 3.1% of families and 4.1% of the population were below the poverty line, including 4.3% of those under age 18 and 6.6% of those age 65 or over.

=== 2000 census ===
As of the 2000 United States census there were 60,456 people, 21,438 households, and 15,949 families residing in the township. The population density was 1,587.4 inhabitants per square mile (612.9/km^{2}). There were 21,896 housing units at an average density of 574.9 per square mile (222.0/km^{2}). The racial makeup of the township was 79.48% White, 10.82% Asian, 5.30% African American, 0.16% Native American, 0.04% Pacific Islander, 1.87% from other races and 2.32% from two or more races. 7.57% of the population were Hispanic or Latino of any race.

There were 21,438 households, out of which 37.8% had children under the age of 18 living with them, 61.2% were married couples living together, 9.5% had a female householder with no husband present, and 25.6% were non-families. 21.1% of all households were made up of individuals, and 6.8% had someone living alone who was 65 years of age or older. The average household size was 2.80 and the average family size was 3.30.

In the township the population was spread out, with 25.9% under the age of 18, 7.0% from 18 to 24, 33.6% from 25 to 44, 22.9% from 45 to 64, and 10.5% who were 65 years of age or older. The median age was 36 years. For every 100 females, there were 95.6 males. For every 100 females age 18 and over, there were 91.7 males.

The median income for a household in the township was $64,707, and the median income for a family was $74,045. Males had a median income of $51,978 versus $35,462 for females. The per capita income for the township was $26,814. About 3.0% of families and 4.2% of the population were below the poverty line, including 5.0% of those under age 18 and 7.2% of those age 65 or over.

== Economy ==
=== Old mill streams ===
Madison Township had many mill streams that were used to generate water power. The Warne family owned fulling mills in the area. Fulling was used as a finishing process used on woolen cloth that would remove the dirt and grease and to compact the wool fibers. The mill is said to have been run behind Old Bridge High School and flows east into the Matawan Creek. The area of Old Bridge was also known for its many mills that manufactured snuff, a scented tobacco product that was used by men and women during that time. The Washington Snuff mill (later renamed the Dill Snuff Mill) was established in 1801 and was located on Mount Pleasant and Old Bridge Turnpike (now Route 516).

=== Clay industry ===
The clay soil in the area surrounding Old Bridge was used for pottery and bricks long before the first European settlers. "Fine clay had surrounded Cheesequake Creek when the Lenni Lenape Native Americans lived there. The early discoveries of clay along the banks opened the clay industry to Middlesex County as well as the state of New Jersey. By the 1800s clay was a major industry. The clay deposits found along Cheesequake Creek are reported to be some of the finest stoneware clays in the United States." The clay supplied local potters as well as those in Hudson Valley, Norwalk, Connecticut, other New England states, and parts of Canada. The earliest use of clay from this area was used by Captain James Morgan before the Revolution. The Perrine clay pit was located near U.S. Route 9 and Ernston Road.

=== Apple farms ===
The Cottrell homestead is a landmark in Old Bridge. It was built in 1831 and still stands today on the northeast corner of County Route 516 and Cottrell Road. The Cottrells owned a 150-acre (61 ha) apple orchard that was located across the street from their home. Apples that could not be used because of their size or quality did not go to waste. Across from the cold-storage building on the southwest corner of Cottrell Road and Route 516, the family built the New Jersey Apple Growers Inc. distillery. It was at this distillery that they pressed the apples into cider and distilled the brandy in large vats. The brandy would age in barrels in a government warehouse that was located on the Cottrells' property. The Cottrells produced apple brandy for twenty years on the farm and sold it wholesale to distributors under the name Browntown.

== Government ==
=== Local government ===
Old Bridge Township is governed within the Faulkner Act, formally known as the Optional Municipal Charter Law, under the Mayor-Council system of municipal government. The township is one of 71 municipalities (of the 564) statewide governed under this form. The Township Council is comprised of nine members, with six elected to represent wards and three elected at-large from the township as a whole in partisan elections held as part of the November general election in odd-numbered years. All elected officials serve four-year terms of office on a staggered basis, with the six ward seats up for election together and the three at-large seats and the mayoral seat up for vote together two years later.

As of 2024, the Mayor of Old Bridge Township is Republican Eleanor "Debbie" Walker, whose term of office ends December 31, 2027. The members of the Township Council are Council President Mary Rita Sohor (R, 2027; At Large), Council Vice-President Anita Greenberg-Belli (R, 2027; At-Large), Darin Accettulli (R, 2029; Ward 2), Erik DePalma (R, 2027; At Large), Kiran Desai (D, 2029; Ward 3), David Merwin (D, 2029; Ward 1), Anthony Paskitti (R, 2029; Ward 5), and Mark Razzoli (R, 2029; Ward 4), and Carl Von Stetten (R, 2029; Ward 6).

Darin Accettulli was appointed to fill the Wars 2 seat expiring in December 2025 that had been held by Erik DePalma, until he took office as an at-large councilmember. Accettulli will serve on an interim basis until the November 2024 general election, when voters will choose a candidate to serve the balance of the term of office.

Republican Mark Razzoli had been behind Democrat Jill DeCaro by 11 votes at the November 2021 general election for the seat in Ward 4. In December 2021, the results were invalidated after it was confirmed that dozens of residents had received incorrect ballots that had voters casting ballots in the incorrect ward. In a March 2022 special election, DeCaro was elected over Razzoli by an 838 to 693 margin.

In January 2020, the Township Council selected Erik DePalma from a list of three candidates nominated by the Republican municipal committee to fill the Second Ward seat expiring in December 2021 that became vacant when Mary Sohor resigned to take office after taking office to an at-large seat.

In June 2016, the Township Council appointed June Dungee to fill the vacant Third Ward seat expiring in December 2017 that had been held by Reginald Butler until his death earlier that month; Dungee served until the November 2016 general election, when voters choose a candidate to serve the balance of the term of office.

The Old Bridge Municipal Court has authority over misdemeanor cases related to traffic violations, criminal offenses, and local ordinance violations that occur within Old Bridge Township.

=== Federal, state and county representation ===
Old Bridge Township is split between the 6th and 12th Congressional Districts and is part of New Jersey's 12th state legislative district.

For the 119th United States Congress, New Jersey's 6th congressional district is represented by Frank Pallone (D, Long Branch). For the 119th United States Congress, New Jersey's 12th congressional district is represented by Bonnie Watson Coleman (D, Ewing Township). New Jersey is represented in the United States Senate by Democrats Cory Booker (Newark, term ends 2027) and Andy Kim (Moorestown, term ends 2031).

For the 2026–2027 session, the 12th legislative district of the New Jersey Legislature is represented in the State Senate by Owen Henry (R, Old Bridge Township) and in the General Assembly by Robert D. Clifton (R, Matawan) and Alex Sauickie (R, Jackson Township).

Middlesex County is governed by a Board of County Commissioners, whose seven members are elected at-large on a partisan basis to serve three-year terms of office on a staggered basis, with either two or three seats coming up for election each year as part of the November general election. At an annual reorganization meeting held in January, the board selects from among its members a commissioner director and deputy director. As of 2025, Middlesex County's Commissioners (with party affiliation, term-end year, and residence listed in parentheses) are:

Director Ronald G. Rios (D, Carteret, 2027), Deputy Director Shanti Narra (D, North Brunswick, 2027), Claribel A. "Clary" Azcona-Barber (D, New Brunswick, 2025), Charles Kenny (D, Woodbridge Township, 2025), Leslie Koppel (D, Monroe Township, 2026), Chanelle Scott McCullum (D, Piscataway, 2025) and Charles E. Tomaro (D, Edison, 2026).

Constitutional officers are: Clerk Nancy Pinkin (D, 2025, East Brunswick), Sheriff Mildred S. Scott (D, 2025, Piscataway) and Surrogate Claribel Cortes (D, 2026; North Brunswick).

=== Politics ===
United States presidential election results for Old Bridge Township
Year	Republican		Democratic		Third party(ies)	
Year	No.	%	No.	%	No.	%
2024	19,272	55.94%	14,347	41.65%	831	2.41%
2020	17,179	49.84%	16,840	48.85%	452	1.31%
2016	14,541	50.60%	13,308	46.31%	889	3.09%
2012	10,911	44.94%	13,127	54.07%	240	0.99%
2008	13,019	47.70%	14,001	51.30%	274	1.00%
2004	12,722	51.21%	11,884	47.84%	237	0.95%
2000	8,684	41.50%	11,484	54.88%	759	3.63%

As of March 2011, there were a total of 38,907 registered voters in Old Bridge Township, of which 10,946 (28.1%) were registered as Democrats, 6,363 (16.4%) were registered as Republicans and 21,577 (55.5%) were registered as Unaffiliated. There were 21 voters registered to other parties.

In the 2012 presidential election, Democrat Barack Obama received 54.1% of the vote (13,127 cast), ahead of Republican Mitt Romney with 44.9% (10,911 votes), and other candidates with 1.0% (240 votes), among the 24,402 ballots cast by the township's 39,947 registered voters (124 ballots were spoiled), for a turnout of 61.1%. In the 2008 presidential election, Democrat Barack Obama received 51.0% of the vote (14,001 cast), ahead of Republican John McCain with 47.4% (13,019 votes) and other candidates with 1.0% (274 votes), among the 27,464 ballots cast by the township's 39,454 registered voters, for a turnout of 69.6%. In the 2004 presidential election, Republican George W. Bush received 51.0% of the vote (12,722 ballots cast), outpolling Democrat John Kerry with 47.7% (11,884 votes) and other candidates with 0.7% (237 votes), among the 24,931 ballots cast by the township's 36,428 registered voters, for a turnout percentage of 68.4.

Gubernatorial election results for Old Bridge
Year	Republican		Democratic		Third party(ies)	
Year	No.	%	No.	%	No.	%
2025	13,256	51.18%	12,465	48.13%	178	0.69%
2021	11,268	56.56%	8,319	41.76%	335	1.68%
2017	7,654	51.58%	7,014	47.26%	172	1.16%
2013	10,211	72.05%	3,755	26.50%	206	1.45%
2009	9,511	60.79%	4,991	31.90%	1,144	7.31%
2005	6,974	46.37%	7,327	48.71%	740	4.92%

In the 2013 gubernatorial election, Republican Chris Christie received 68.3% of the vote (10,211 cast), ahead of Democrat Barbara Buono with 30.3% (4,532 votes), and other candidates with 1.4% (206 votes), among the 15,147 ballots cast by the township's 40,437 registered voters (198 ballots were spoiled), for a turnout of 37.5%. In the 2009 gubernatorial election, Republican Chris Christie received 57.8% of the vote (9,511 ballots cast), ahead of Democrat Jon Corzine with 35.9% (5,898 votes), Independent Chris Daggett with 5.9% (976 votes) and other candidates with 1.0% (168 votes), among the 16,444 ballots cast by the township's 38,430 registered voters, yielding a 42.8% turnout.

United States Senate election results for Old Bridge1
Year	Republican		Democratic		Third party(ies)	
Year	No.	%	No.	%	No.	%
2024	17,380	53.46%	13,970	42.97%	1,162	3.57%
2018	11,041	50.03%	10,342	46.86%	685	3.10%
2012	10,360	45.45%	11,988	52.60%	445	1.95%
2006	6,052	46.14%	6,607	50.37%	458	3.49%

United States Senate election results for Old Bridge2
Year	Republican		Democratic		Third party(ies)	
Year	No.	%	No.	%	No.	%
2020	16,318	48.46%	16,529	49.09%	826	2.45%
2014	5,306	50.42%	5,050	47.99%	167	1.59%
2013	4,379	51.51%	4,045	47.58%	78	0.92%
2008	11,559	46.10%	12,947	51.64%	567	2.26%

== Education ==
The Old Bridge Township Public Schools serve students in kindergarten through twelfth grade. As of the 2022–23 school year, the district, comprised of 14 schools, had an enrollment of 8,096 students and 670.5 classroom teachers (on an FTE basis), for a student–teacher ratio of 12.1:1. Schools in the district (with 2022–23 enrollment data from the National Center for Education Statistics) are M. Scott Carpenter Elementary School (with 226 students in grades K–5), Leroy Gordon Cooper Elementary School (196; K–5), Virgil I. Grissom Elementary School (182; K–5), Madison Park Elementary School (285; K–5), James A. McDivitt Elementary School (532; K–5), Memorial Elementary School (417; K–5), William A. Miller Elementary School (332; K–5), Walter M. Schirra Elementary School (269; K–5), Alan B. Shepard Elementary School (280; K–5), Southwood Elementary School (343; K–5), Raymond E. Voorhees Elementary School (394; K–5), Jonas Salk Middle School (903; 6–8), Carl Sandburg Middle School (981; 6–8) and Old Bridge High School (2,707; 9–12).

Eighth grade students from all of Middlesex County are eligible to apply to attend the high school programs offered by the Middlesex County Magnet Schools, a county-wide vocational school district that offers full-time career and technical education at its schools in East Brunswick, Edison, Perth Amboy, Piscataway and Woodbridge Township, with no tuition charged to students for attendance.

Multiple private schools operate in the township. Calvary Christian School serves students in grades K–10, operating within Calvary Chapel Old Bridge. St. Ambrose School and St. Thomas the Apostle School are Pre-K–8 Catholic elementary schools that operate under the supervision of the Roman Catholic Diocese of Metuchen. St. Thomas the Apostle School was recognized in 2018 by the National Blue Ribbon Schools Program of the United States Department of Education.

== Infrastructure ==
=== Transportation ===
==== Roads and highways ====
As of May 2010, the township had a total of 222.24 miles (357.66 km) of roadways, of which 179.32 miles (288.59 km) were maintained by the municipality, 24.41 miles (39.28 km) by Middlesex County and 16.65 miles (26.80 km) by the New Jersey Department of Transportation and 1.86 miles (2.99 km) by the New Jersey Turnpike Authority.

The township is crisscrossed by many major roads and highways.

The Garden State Parkway passes through Old Bridge for about 1.9 miles (3.1 km), connecting Aberdeen in Monmouth County to the south and Sayreville to the north and houses Interchange 120, which is signed for Laurence Harbor / Matawan.

Other routes, such as U.S. Route 9, Route 18, Route 34 and Route 35 also pass through the township. Major county routes that pass through are County Road 516, County Road 520, County Road 527 and County Road 615.

The New Jersey Turnpike (Interstate 95) is minutes north along Route 18 outside the township in bordering East Brunswick (Exit 9) and not too far away in bordering Monroe Township (Exit 8A).

==== Public transportation ====
Old Bridge Airport
- IATA: none; ICAO: none; FAA LID: 3N6

Summary
- Airport type: Public use
- Owner: Madison Inc.
- Operator: Paul Cerniglia
- Serves: Freehold Borough / New Brunswick areas
- Location: Old Bridge, Middlesex County, New Jersey
- Elevation AMSL: 87 ft (27 m)
- Interactive map of Old Bridge Airport

Runways
Direction	Length		Surface
Direction	ft	m	Surface
6/24	3,594	1,095	Asphalt

Statistics (2008)
- Aircraft operations: 14,325
- Based aircraft: 4
- Source: Federal Aviation Administration

===== Busing =====
For busing, Old Bridge Park & Ride is located along U.S. Route 9 northbound, close to Ernston Road.

NJ Transit Bus Operations provides bus service to communities along U.S. Route 9 from Lakewood to Old Bridge, via bus routes 131, 133, 134, 135, 138, and 139 to the Port Authority Bus Terminal in New York City, service to Newark on the 67, on the 64 and 68 to Jersey City and local service on the 817 and 818 routes. Bus service is available from U.S. Route 9 to Wall Street in New York's Financial District via the Academy Bus Line.

Middlesex County Area Transit shuttles provide service on routes operating across the county, including the M3 route, which operates between Brunswick Square Mall and Old Bridge and the M7 route between Brunswick Square Mall and South Amboy.

===== Rail =====
Old Bridge borders Matawan on Route 34, and the Aberdeen-Matawan Train Station, and it also borders South Amboy on U.S. Route 9, and the South Amboy Train Station, both located along the North Jersey Coast Line. Old Bridge is also close to the New Brunswick train station in nearby New Brunswick and Metropark in nearby Iselin on the Northeast Corridor Line.

===== Aviation =====
Old Bridge Airport is a general aviation facility located 5 miles (8.0 km) south of the central business district. The closest commercial airport is Newark Liberty International Airport, which is about 23 miles (37 km) (about 32 minute drive) from the center of Old Bridge Township.

=== Healthcare ===
Raritan Bay Medical Center has two hospitals in the area, the Old Bridge division and the Perth Amboy division. The Old Bridge Division, known as Hackensack Meridian which handles all but trauma cases is located at the intersection of Route 18 and Ferry Road.

Other regional hospitals near the township that handle all but trauma cases include CentraState Medical Center in nearby Freehold and Bayshore Medical Center in nearby Holmdel. Most trauma cases are handled by Robert Wood Johnson University Hospital in nearby New Brunswick.

Old Bridge also has many long-term care facilities and nursing homes.

=== Emergency services ===
==== Police department ====
Old Bridge maintains a full-time police department consisting of 90 sworn personnel divided into multiple bureaus. The police department handles approximately 50,000 to 55,000 calls for service each year.

- Administration Bureau: Chief of Police. Police radio, computer, 9-1-1, and dispatch operations. Training, scheduling etc.
- Patrol Bureau: First responders for calls of service, motor vehicle crash investigators, motor vehicle and criminal law enforcement, road construction, special operations.
- Traffic Safety Bureau: All traffic enforcement, road construction planning, commuter lot parking enforcement, state funded grants (i.e.:seatbelt enforcement, mobile phone enforcement, child seat, pedestrian etc.) serious and fatal motor vehicle crash investigations, large scale lane closings for events or crashes, road striping, traffic sign replacement and repair, ATV details, special events. Security of impounded vehicles.
- Detective Bureau: Investigates all serious offenses and crimes, serious and fatal motor vehicle crash investigations, plain clothes operations. Works closely with FBI, United States Secret Service, Alcoholic Beverage Control and other federal agencies.
- Identification Bureau: Works in conjunction with the detective bureau, documents all serious crime scenes, photography for crime scenes and fatal/serious motor vehicle crashes, fingerprinting, evidence collection, processing and storing, civilian background checks, Megans Law enforcement, firearms application investigating and processing.
- Narcotics Bureau: All drug- and alcohol-related investigations, undercover operations, surveillance, liaisons with Prosecutors office, special operations, raids. Keeps a close relationship with the DEA.
- Fire Arms Unit: Officers trained in qualifying and training all police personnel in weapons systems. This unit repairs and maintains firearms, gear and schedules all state mandated firearms training for the officers. Orders ammunition and supplies related to officer gear.
- Special Operations: Department of Homeland Security liaisons, Laurence Harbor and Cliffwood Beach boardwalk and beachfront details, anti-terrorism and counter-terrorism training, covert operations.
- Police Garage: Mechanics trained in police vehicle repair, wiring, maintenance, storage of impounded vehicles.
- Auxiliary Police: Patrol in marked cars and uniform. They augment the regular officers while on patrol. Auxiliary officers provide additional security for events and details, parade traffic assistance, township fairs, carnivals, benefit functions etc. These officers fall under the Office of Emergency Management section of the township and are all volunteers, receiving no paychecks for their services.
- Special police officers: Most of these "special" employees are classified as Class I officers. They provide security at parks and recreation areas, conduct crowd control and are frequently used on court days to handle prisoners. They also serve as another set of eyes and ears for the patrol bureau. Class II officers are also employed in the township. Class II police officers are armed and hold the same powers as officers within the patrol bureau while they are on duty.

==== Fire departments ====
Old Bridge is divided into four fire districts:

- Fire District 1: Laurence Harbor Fire Department, established in 1924 and operating out of two stations.
- Fire District 2: Cheesequake Volunteer Fire Company, with Station 1 at 113 Route 34, Station 2 at 4290 Route 516 and Station 3 at 3080 Route 516.
- Fire District 3: South Old Bridge Volunteer Fire Company, established in 1947 and operating out of three stations, with Engine Company 1 located at 958 Englishtown Road, Engine Company 2 at 14 Throckmorton Lane and Engine Company 3 at 1599 Englishtown Road.
- Fire District 4: Madison Park Volunteer Fire Company, organized in 1956.

Each of the above have several different fire houses with adequate equipment and trucks to handle any and all situations that arise within the township or surrounding towns. Old Bridge is equipped for:

- HAZMAT
- Tower rescue
- Water rescue/ice rescue
- Heavy Duty rescue
- General search and rescue
- Wildland firefighting
- Trench rescue

==== Medical/first aid services ====
Old Bridge is divided into five districts each with a volunteer first aid squad. Numerous ambulances are in service for the community. A paid squad is employed between the hours of 6am to 6pm. A majority of all the volunteer squads are defunct.

- Cheesequake Volunteer First Aid Squad, formed in 1969 (Defunct in 2021).
- Laurence Harbor Volunteer First Aid Squad, established in 1927 and serving the areas of Laurence Harbor, Cliffwood Beach, Genoa, Cheesequake State Park, Cheesequake Village and Ellen Heath
- Madison Park Volunteer First Aid Squad, formed in 1959 (Defunct as of 2023)
- Old Bridge First Aid and Rescue Squad (nicknamed "Red & White" due to the color of their ambulances) (Defunct as of 2023)
- Old Bridge Volunteer Emergency Medical Services (nicknamed "Green & White" due to the color of their ambulances) (Defunct as of 2023)

Old Bridge Township Emergency Medical Services (OBTEMS) is the municipal paid service which covers daytime hours 6am–6pm.

Advanced Life Support, also known as medics, are paid personnel dispatched to all township calls based on the requirements of assistance. Medics respond to all life/death situations due to a traumatic injury, industrial accident, heart problems, strokes, serious vehicle crashes, etc. The medics are housed by Robert Wood Johnson University Hospital, Saint Peter's University Hospital and Raritan Bay Medical Center. Each are assigned their own ambulance.

== Township attractions ==
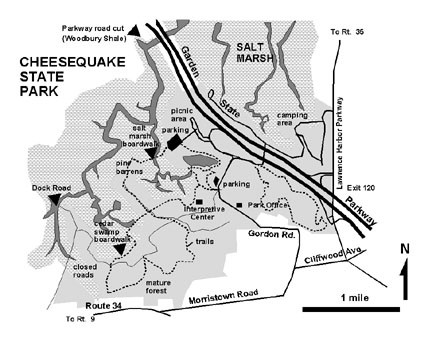
Map of Cheesequake State Park in Old Bridge

- Cheesequake State Park covers 1,600 acres (650 ha), offering recreation opportunities including hiking and camping.
- Laurence Harbor Beachfront offers 70 acres (28 ha) on the Raritan Bay waterfront, with beaches, playgrounds and fishing available, in addition to a boardwalk and walkways at Paul's Beach stretching 1.3 miles (2.1 km).
- John Piccolo Arena
- Old Bridge Airport
- Old Bridge Township Raceway Park operated from 1965 to 2018 for drag racing, after which its owners planned to turn it into space for outdoor concerts.
- Township parks include Veterans Park and Geick Park

== Community and historical information ==
- CPS Madison Industries Superfund Site has been identified as the 14th-worst Superfund site in the United States. That area is fenced off along Waterworks Road, near Cheesequake Road. This area has one chemical plant still operating, Old Bridge Chemical. A former plant, Ciba Chemical closed several years ago and a bulk of the plant was demolished, only the office building remains.
- Many small ponds in the area are remnants of clay pits dug in the 19th century, as clay was a major industry. The Perrine clay pit was located near Route 9 and Ernston Road.
- The Runyon coal yards were located off Bordentown Avenue and Cheesequake Road, at the site of Stavola Asphalt Construction Company (formerly Manzos Contracting). Rail cars at this yard were used to transport their loads to the South Amboy docks, where the coal was shipped to New York City.
- Pilings of former docks can be found by foot traversing Steamboat Landing Road, also known as Dock Road, which is the extension of Cottrell Road at its intersection of Route 34.
- The Ochwald Brickworks, now the site of Bridgepointe Development in Laurence Harbor, began operation in 1910 and continued operation into the early 1960s. Behind the Bridgepointe Development and far into the woodline and field, old bricks can still be found.
- The Kepec Chemical Company in the Genoa section (off County Road) is where Julius and Ethel Rosenberg were reported to have contacted Russian spies in 1950. The FBI conducted surveillance of the building at the intersection of Biondi Avenue and Gordon Street. Only a few bricks remain to mark this location at the foot of Columbus Avenue.
- A mass grave in the Ernst Memorial Cemetery off Ernston Road holds the remains of over a dozen unidentified victims of the T. A. Gillespie Company Shell Loading Plant explosion of 1918. This plant exploded in the Morgan section of neighboring Sayreville, killing an estimated 100 persons. Shock waves were felt as far north as Newark.
- A horse-racing track used to be located where present day Lakeridge development now stands (near the border with Matawan Borough.)
- A circular car racing track (early 1950s to approximately 1982) used to be located off County Route 516 where the Whispering Pines Development is now. No visible trace remains.
- Cheesequake State Park, one of the oldest in the country, opening on June 22, 1940, covers 1,274 acres (516 ha), partially located in Old Bridge. Located near the Garden State Parkway exit 120, Route 34 and Route 35, the park is often crowded by sunbathers, picnics, concert goers (nearby PNC Bank Arts Center) and tourists.
- A Cold War-era Nike missile base is located off U.S. Route 9 on Jake Brown Road. Listed in Weird NJ as a haunted site, readers frequent this area and explore the fields where former base worker residences once stood. The actual base was purchased by the Old Bridge Township Public Schools for use as storage. The former underground silos and tunnels were purposely flooded and caved in when the base was closed.
- Old Bridge Township Raceway Park, a racetrack that had hosted Funny Car and drag racing including the NHRA Summernationals, is located off Englishtown Road near the township's border with Manalapan and Monroe. As part of a January 2018 reorganization, the facility announced that it will no longer be holding drag racing events, retaining kart and motocross races, as well as car shows and concerts.
- On September 3, 1977, the Grateful Dead performed for a crowd of 100,000 at Raceway Park. The show was recorded and released in album form as part of "Dick's Picks", a series of live albums, in 1999.
- The heavy metal band Metallica relocated from Los Angeles to the township in the early 1980s to record the songs on what would be their debut album Kill 'Em All.

== Notable people ==
People who were born in, residents of, or otherwise closely associated with Old Bridge Township include:

- Brandon Allen (born 1993), professional soccer player for the New York Red Bulls
- R. J. Allen (born 1990), professional soccer player for New York City FC
- Josh Ansley, bass player for Streetlight Manifesto and Catch 22
- Andrew Brooks (1969–2021), associate research professor at Rutgers University and immunologist, who was the developer of the first FDA-approved rapid saliva test for COVID-19 diagnosis
- Adam Chazen (born 1986), special effects producer, best known for his work on the cable television series Game of Thrones, for which he has received five Emmy Awards
- Louis Consalvo (born 1958), reputed soldier in the DeCavalcante crime family
- Quinton Crawford (born 1990), assistant coach for the Los Angeles Lakers of the NBA
- Nick DeGennaro (born 2000), wide receiver for the New England Patriots
- Junot Díaz (born 1968), Pulitzer Prize-winning novelist
- Doug Emhoff (born 1964), Second gentleman of the United States as husband of Vice President Kamala Harris
- Mikey Erg (born 1980), punk rock drummer who was a member of The Ergs!
- Colleen Fitzpatrick (born 1972), a pop music artist, dancer and actress, better known by her stage name, Vitamin C
- Minkah Fitzpatrick (born 1996), American football defensive back for the Miami Dolphins
- Bill Flynn (born 1938), politician who served in the New Jersey General Assembly from 1974 to 1986 and as mayor of Old Bridge Township
- Laurie Hernandez (born 2000), artistic gymnast representing Team USA at the 2016 Summer Olympics. Gold medalist in the team competition
- Phil Ivey (born 1977), professional poker player
- Franklin Lawson, retired soccer player who played professionally in the American Soccer League and the United Soccer League
- Caren Lissner (born 1972), novelist
- Hoddy Mahon (1932–2011), high school and collegiate basketball coach who was the head coach of the Seton Hall Pirates
- Fabian Nicieza (born 1961), comic book writer and editor who is best known for his work on Marvel titles such as X-Men, X-Force, New Warriors, Cable & Deadpool and Thunderbolts
- Brian O'Halloran (born 1969), actor. Appeared in Clerks and Clerks 2
- Jodi Lyn O'Keefe (born 1978), actress
- Tab Ramos (born 1966), retired soccer midfielder
- George Rizzi (born 1951), guitarist and musical director of the 1960s pop/rock group the Happenings, whose hits include "See You in September" and "Go Away Little Girl"
- Michael Rotkowitz (born 1974), applied mathematician best known for his work in decentralized control theory
- Diane Ruggiero, screenwriter for Veronica Mars
- Ed Sanicki (1923–1998), outfielder who played for the Philadelphia Phillies
- Donna Simpson (born 1967), Guinness World Record holder for largest mother
- Artur Sitkowski (born 2000), American football coach for the Illinois Fighting Illini
- Joann H. Smith (1934–1998), politician who served in the New Jersey General Assembly from the 13th Legislative District from 1986 to 1998
- Shannon Sohn (born 1974), first helicopter reporter to earn a national Emmy Award
- William H. Sutphin (1887–1972) represented New Jersey's 3rd congressional district from 1931 to 1943
- Tammy Lynn Sytch (born 1972), professional wrestling manager best known for her time in the World Wrestling Federation as the character, Sunny
