= William H. Sutphin =

American politician (1887-1972)

William Halstead Sutphin
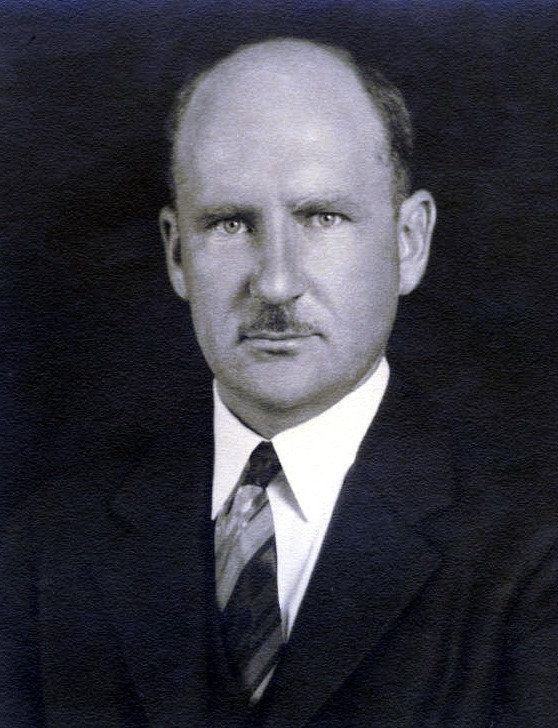
- Sutphin in 1935

Member of the U.S. House of Representatives from New Jersey's 3rd district
- In office March 4, 1931 – January 3, 1943
- Preceded by: Harold G. Hoffman (R)
- Succeeded by: James C. Auchincloss (R)

Personal details
- Born: August 30, 1887 Browntown, New Jersey, US
- Died: October 14, 1972 (aged 85) Salisbury, Maryland, US
- Party: Democratic
- Spouse: Catherine Sutphin
- Profession: Politician

William Halstead Sutphin (August 30, 1887 – October 14, 1972) was an American military officer, businessman, and Democratic Party politician who represented New Jersey's 3rd congressional district for six terms from 1931 to 1943.

== Early life and career ==
He was born on August 30, 1887, in the Browntown section of Old Bridge Township, New Jersey, and attended the public schools of Matawan, New Jersey. He attended the Woods Business College in Brooklyn and attended the officers training camp at Plattsburgh, New York, in 1915.

He was Mayor of Matawan, New Jersey, from 1915 to 1916 and again from 1921 to 1926. He served on the United States-Mexico border in 1916 (see Pancho Villa Expedition) with B Troop, First Squadron, New Jersey Cavalry.

During World War I he served in France from December 1917 to May 1919 and was discharged as captain in the Air Service. He was a factory representative for asphalt roofing from 1920 to 1931.

== U.S. House of Representatives ==
Sutphin was elected as a Democrat to the Seventy-second Congress and to the five succeeding Congresses (March 4, 1931–January 3, 1943). He was an unsuccessful candidate for reelection in 1942 to the Seventy-eighth Congress.

== Later career and death ==
After leaving office, he went on to be vice president of the M.J. Merkin Paint Co., in New York City. He retired in 1951 and resided in Berlin, Maryland.

Sutphin died in Salisbury, Maryland, on October 14, 1972, and was interred in Arlington National Cemetery.

U.S. House of Representatives
Preceded by Harold G. Hoffman	Member of the U.S. House of Representatives from New Jersey's 3rd congressional district March 4, 1931–January 3, 1943	Succeeded by James C. Auchincloss
