= Old Bridge (CDP), New Jersey =

Populated place in Middlesex County, New Jersey, US

Old Bridge, New Jersey
- Census-designated place
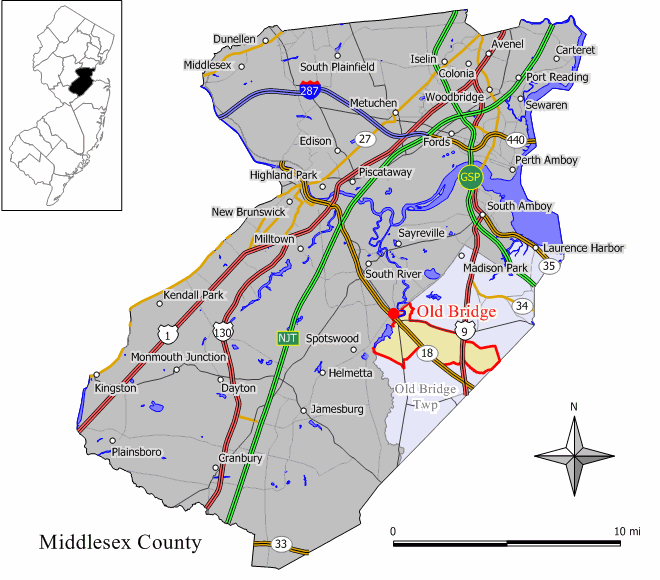
- Location of Old Bridge CDP in Middlesex County highlighted in yellow (right). Inset map: Location of Middlesex County in New Jersey highlighted in black (left).

- Location in Middlesex County Location in New Jersey Location in the United States
- Coordinates: 40.396577°N 74.334317°W
- Country: United States
- State: New Jersey
- County: Middlesex
- Township: Old Bridge

Area
  - Total: 8.07 sq mi (20.90 km^{2})
  - Land: 7.87 sq mi (20.39 km^{2})
  - Water: 0.20 sq mi (0.51 km^{2}) 2.39%
- Elevation: 20 ft (6 m)

Population (2020)
  - Total: 27,210
  - Density: 3,456.6/sq mi (1,334.6/km^{2})
- Time zone: UTC−05:00 (Eastern (EST))
  - Summer (DST): UTC−04:00 (Eastern (EDT))
- ZIP Code: 08857
- Area codes: 732/848
- FIPS code: 34-54690
- GNIS feature ID: 02389616

Old Bridge is a census-designated place (CDP) within Old Bridge Township, Middlesex County, New Jersey, United States. As of the 2020 census, the CDP's population was 27,210, up from 23,753 in 2010. The CDP occupies only a portion of Old Bridge Township.

== Geography ==
The Old Bridge CDP is in eastern Middlesex County, covering the central and western parts of Old Bridge Township. The CDP is bordered to the northeast by Brownville (also within Old Bridge Township) and to the west by Spotswood in East Brunswick. The far southeast edge of the CDP follows the Monmouth County line.

U.S. Route 9 crosses the eastern part of the community, leading north 6 miles (10 km) to South Amboy and south 10 miles (16 km) to Freehold. New Jersey Route 18 passes through the western side of Old Bridge, connecting northwest 9 miles (14 km) to New Brunswick, the Middlesex county seat, and southeast 19 miles (31 km) to the Garden State Parkway in Tinton Falls.

According to the U.S. Census Bureau, the Old Bridge CDP has a total area of 8.07 square miles (20.90 km^{2}), including 7.87 square miles (20.38 km^{2}) of land and 0.20 square miles (0.52 km^{2}) of water (2.44%). The CDP is bordered to the west by Duhernal Lake and the South River, and the entire community drains westward to the river, mainly via Iresick Brook (in the western part of the CDP) and Deep Run (running through the center). Via the South River, Old Bridge is within the Raritan River watershed.

== Demographics ==
Historical population
Census	Pop.	Note	%±
1970	22,240		—
1980	21,815		−1.9%
1990	22,151		1.5%
2000	22,833		3.1%
2010	23,753		4.0%
2020	27,210		14.6%
Population sources: 1980; 1950 1960 1970; 1980 1990 2000; 2010 2020

Old Bridge first appeared as an unincorporated community in the 1970 U.S. census; and then was listed as a census designated place in the 1980 U.S. census.

=== 2020 census ===
Old Bridge CDP, New Jersey – Racial and ethnic composition Note: the US Census treats Hispanic/Latino as an ethnic category. This table excludes Latinos from the racial categories and assigns them to a separate category. Hispanics/Latinos may be of any race.
Race / Ethnicity (NH = Non-Hispanic)	Pop 2000	Pop 2010	Pop 2020	% 2000	% 2010	% 2020
White alone (NH)	18,403	17,091	17,491	80.60%	71.95%	64.28%
Black or African American alone (NH)	814	964	1,400	3.57%	4.06%	5.15%
Native American or Alaska Native alone (NH)	30	28	22	0.13%	0.12%	0.08%
Asian alone (NH)	1,793	2,615	3,450	7.85%	11.01%	12.68%
Native Hawaiian or Pacific Islander alone (NH)	6	5	8	0.03%	0.02%	0.03%
Other race alone (NH)	25	97	184	0.11%	0.41%	0.68%
Mixed race or Multiracial (NH)	261	347	715	1.14%	1.46%	2.63%
Hispanic or Latino (any race)	1,501	2,606	3,940	6.57%	10.97%	14.48%
Total	22,833	23,753	27,210	100.00%	100.00%	100.00%

=== 2010 census ===
The 2010 United States census counted 23,753 people, 7,775 households, and 6,368 families in the CDP. The population density was 3,345.5 people per square mile (1,291.7 people/km^{2}). There were 7,987 housing units at an average density of 1,124.9 units per square mile (434.3 units/km^{2}). The racial makeup was 79.56% (18,897) White, 4.38% (1,041) Black or African American, 0.18% (43) Native American, 11.07% (2,630) Asian, 0.02% (5) Pacific Islander, 2.64% (626) from other races, and 2.15% (511) from two or more races. Hispanic or Latino of any race were 10.97% (2,606) of the population.

Of the 7,775 households, 39.8% had children under the age of 18; 68.6% were married couples living together; 9.2% had a female householder with no husband present and 18.1% were non-families. Of all households, 15.3% were made up of individuals and 8.2% had someone living alone who was 65 years of age or older. The average household size was 3.03 and the average family size was 3.39.

24.8% of the population were under the age of 18, 8.2% from 18 to 24, 24.6% from 25 to 44, 29.8% from 45 to 64, and 12.7% who were 65 years of age or older. The median age was 40.2 years. For every 100 females, the population had 96.9 males. For every 100 females ages 18 and older there were 93.7 males.

=== 2000 census ===
As of the 2000 United States census, there were 22,833 people, 7,274 households, and 6,233 families living in the CDP. The population density was 1,250.5 people/km^{2} (3,239 people/mi^{2}). There were 7,346 housing units at an average density of 402.3 units/km^{2} (1,042 units/mi^{2}). The racial makeup of the CDP was 85.12% White, 3.76% African American, 0.14% Native American, 7.91% Asian, 0.03% Pacific Islander, 1.39% from other races, and 1.66% from two or more races. Hispanic or Latino of any race were 6.57% of the population.

There were 7,274 households, out of which 43.6% had children under the age of 18 living with them, 73.5% were married couples living together, 8.9% had a female householder with no husband present, and 14.3% were non-families. 12.0% of all households were made up of individuals, and 5.1% had someone living alone who was 65 years of age or older. The average household size was 3.11 and the average family size was 3.39.

In the CDP the population was spread out, with 27.5% under the age of 18, 6.8% from 18 to 24, 31.9% from 25 to 44, 23.1% from 45 to 64, and 10.7% who were 65 years of age or older. The median age was 37 years. For every 100 females, there were 96.4 males. For every 100 females age 18 and over, there were 91.9 males.

The median income for a household in the CDP was $73,824, and the median income for a family was $79,230. Males had a median income of $54,906 versus $36,345 for females. The per capita income for the CDP was $26,395. About 2.0% of families and 2.9% of the population were below the poverty line, including 3.6% of those under the age of 18 and 6.5% of those 65 and older.
