= CPS Madison Industries Superfund Site =

Coordinates: 40.4284°N 74.3368°W

The CPS Madison Industries Superfund Site is located in Old Bridge, New Jersey. Since 1967, site operators had improperly handled high-risk substances by expelling them into public sewer systems throughout the township. Established in 1962, CPS Madison Industries, located in Middlesex County, New Jersey, has remained a large competitor in the copper and zinc industry producing compounds primarily for food additives, fertilizers, and pharmaceuticals. CPS Madison Industries was declared to be a superfund site as of September 8, 1983, due to its improper handlings of Volatile Organic Compounds, and has since been undergoing groundwater pump and treatment systems since 1991.

== Origins ==
Originally Madison Township, Old Bridge Township was assimilated in 1975 to refrain from confusion with the borough of Madison, located in Morris County, New Jersey. Based on the 2010 United States census, there were 65,357 people living in Old Bridge Township and it is 40.783 square miles in total size. The Township of Old Bridge is home to the 14th worst superfund site in the United States of America, due to its contamination of Volatile Organic Chemicals.

=== Company history ===
CPS Madison Industries was established in 1962 and declared to be a superfund site on September 8, 1983. Ciba Specialty Chemicals acquired the company in 1998 and kept the company until 2001. Ciba Inc. was then purchased by BASF Corporation, the largest chemical company in the world, hence, the company was now under the control of BASF. In 2010, BASF Corporation was officially held accountable for the superfund site. In 2015, Madison Industries acquired the site and currently, Old Bridge Chemicals Inc. is in charge of the location. In 1983, the case of the City of Perth Amboy v. Madison Industries was initiated and was not concluded until 2015, battling against two polluters for contamination of a city water supply in violation of the New Jersey Spill Compensation and Control and Water Pollution Control Acts.

== Superfund design ==
The main issues with the superfund site arose when the BASF corporation was in control of the area in 2010. Though the CPS Madison Industries property was declared to be a superfund site in 1983, evident attempts at taking action had only began to appear as of 2010.

=== State Intervention ===
Tracing back from today, site operators since 1967 improperly handled hazardous substances by expelling them into the public sewer system. Not until 2010 was the BASF Corporation held accountable for the cleanup process of the CPS Madison site. Groundwater pump and treat systems were put into effect and ran by the company who owned the location at the time, eventually making a milestone when falling under the control of BASF. The groundwater pump and treat systems are still in usage currently along with various fencing methods and signs to keep people away from the land.

=== National intervention ===
The EPA states that federal government had decided to address the CPS Madison site in two stages including interim and long remedial. Regarding superfund sites, the EPA claims that “sites with HRS scores of 28.5 or greater are eligible for placement on the NPL." CPS Madison Industries remains on the National Priority List, eventually lowering on the scale as clean ups occur. Following the locations classification as a superfund site by the EPA, with the aid of the superfund reserve, the EPA was able to put in place water purifying systems in attempt to repair the damages made to Perth Amboy, New Jersey, enhanced the groundwater pump and treat systems, and commenced with in 2015 and are still proceeding with remedial investigations administered and organized by the EPA and carried out by the state to potentially be able to once again use the sites land in a safe fashion.

== Health and environmental hazards ==
Many of the problems with the superfund program are illustrated by the CPS Madison Industries case, according to the Star Ledger. The company is blamed for contaminating Perth Amboy, New Jersey’s water supply, but still has not cleaned it up. The EPA has claimed to have assumed procedural changes to expedite cleanups as stated by the state news service from the New York Times, including stricter supervision of contracted clean up companies and more emphasis on public disclosure. The hazardous chemicals used at the CPS Madison Industries’ superfund site consisted of volatile organic compounds (VOC), as well as zinc sulfate and copper compounds.

=== Chemical contamination ===
Volatile Organic Compounds are organic chemicals that consist of a high vapor pressure at regular room temperature. Many Volatile Organic Compounds are hazardous air pollutants that can contribute to climate change. “At present, not much is known about what health effects occur from the levels of organic compounds are known to cause cancer in animals; some are suspected of causing, or are known to cause cancer in humans,” according to Wikipedia. These composites can potentially harm humans in a fatal way, and along with zinc sulfate and copper cause trauma to the earth and nature surrounding.

== Clean up ==
At the CPS Madison Industries superfund site, clean up methods were initiated originally with groundwater pump and treat systems along with efforts to put up fencing around Prickett’s Pond and Prickett’s Brook which is downgradient from the site. Part of the property was owned by Old Bridge Chemicals Inc. and another part by Madison Industries. The Old Bridge Chemicals Inc. side of the site is currently clear of all toxins, but the Madison Industries side according to the EPA is neither clear nor has the ability to be used safely by people, and is still undergoing remedial investigations that began in 2015.

=== Initial cleanup ===
The initial cleanup of the CPS Madison Industries site began in 1991, after the EPA recognized the area as a superfund site in 1983, with implementing groundwater pump and treat systems. Pump and treat is a common method for cleaning up groundwater contaminated with dissolved chemicals, where the water is pumped from wells to an above-ground treatment system to remove the contaminants. Prickett’s Pond and Prickett’s Brook, which are downstream from the superfund area, though they were not for human use prior to the site, have enclosures such as fencing around the areas as well as “No Trespassing” signs to serve as warnings.

=== Current status ===
Air stripping techniques are presently used, in addition to the other cleanup methods, to remove the Volatile Organic Compounds by moving air through contaminated waters in above ground treatment systems. On site response actions are still being taken with feasibility studies underway stating that the CPS or Old Bridge Chemicals Inc. side is currently safe, but the Madison Industries side of the property is still under intense cleanup and investigations.
