= Browntown, New Jersey =

Populated place in Middlesex County, New Jersey, US

- Unincorporated community
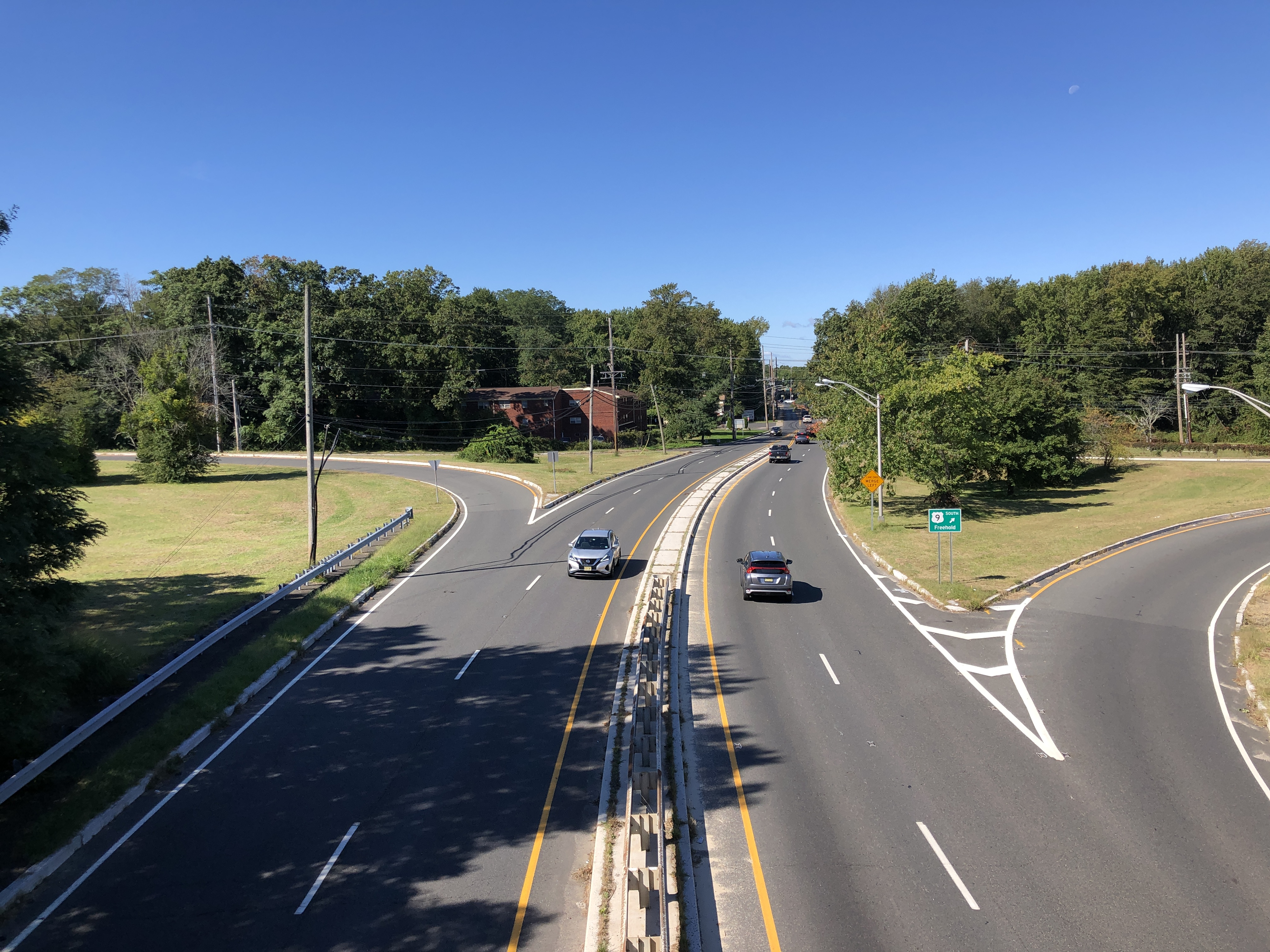
- Browntown along County Route 516 as seen from U.S. Route 9

- Location within Middlesex County, New Jersey Location within New Jersey Location within the United States
- Coordinates: 40°24′06″N 74°18′24″W
- Country: United States
- State: New Jersey
- County: Middlesex
- Township: Old Bridge
- Elevation: 82 ft (25 m)
- ZIP Code: 08857
- GNIS feature ID: 874985

Browntown is an unincorporated community located within Old Bridge Township in Middlesex County, in the U.S. state of New Jersey. The area is served as United States Postal Service ZIP Code 08857.

As of the 2020 United States Census, the population for ZIP Code Tabulation Area 08857 was 40,675.

== Notable people ==
People who were born in, residents of, or otherwise closely associated with Browntown include:

- William H. Sutphin (1887–1972) represented New Jersey's 3rd congressional district 1931–1943.
