= Old Bridge Airport =

Coordinates: 40°19′47.592″N 074°20′48.43″W

- IATA: none; ICAO: none; FAA LID: 3N6

Summary
- Airport type: Public use
- Owner: Madison Inc.
- Operator: Paul Cerniglia
- Serves: Freehold / New Brunswick areas
- Location: Old Bridge Township, Middlesex County, New Jersey
- Elevation AMSL: 87 ft (27 m)
- Website: oldbridgeairport.com

Map
- Interactive map of Old Bridge Airport

Runways
Direction	Length		Surface
Direction	ft	m	Surface
6/24	3,594	1,095	Asphalt

Statistics (2008)
- Aircraft operations: 14,325
- Based aircraft: 4
- Source: Federal Aviation Administration

Old Bridge Airport (FAA LID: 3N6) is a public-use airport located five nautical miles (9.26 km) south of the central business district of the township of Old Bridge Township in Middlesex County, New Jersey, United States. The airport is privately owned. The airport is located next to Old Bridge Township Raceway Park. There is 100LL fuel on the field.
