= Michael Rotkowitz =

Michael C. Rotkowitz
- Born: 12 September 1974 (age 51)
- Education: Stanford University
- Awards: PECASE (2014) NSF CAREER Award (2014); SIAM Control and Systems Theory Prize (2011) IEEE Axelby Award (2007)
- Scientific career
- Workplaces: University of Maryland; University of Melbourne Australian National University Royal Institute of Technology
- Thesis: Tractable Problems in Optimal Decentralized Control (2005)
- Doctoral advisor: Sanjay Lall
- Website: https://mcrotk.github.io/

Michael Charles Rotkowitz (born 1974) is an applied mathematician best known for his work in decentralized control theory. He was a professor at the University of Maryland, College Park, where he held appointments in the Department of Electrical and Computer Engineering (ECE) and the Institute for Systems Research (ISR), and was also affiliated with the Applied Mathematics & Statistics, and Scientific Computation Program (AMSC).

Rotkowitz took leave from his university position to work as a staff research scientist with Lyft Marketplace Labs in San Francisco, subsequently worked with Amazon Transportation Services’ Middle Mile team, and now works with Instacart.

Born in Brooklyn, Rotkowitz grew up in Old Bridge Township, New Jersey.

== Education ==
Rotkowitz received a B.S. in mathematical and computational science, an M.S. in statistics, and an M.S. and Ph.D. in aeronautics and astronautics, all from Stanford University.

== Academic career ==
Rotkowitz was the postdoctoral fellow in networked embedded control at the Royal Institute of Technology (KTH) in Stockholm, Sweden from 2005 to 2006, and a research fellow with the Australian National University in Canberra, Australia from 2006 to 2008. From 2008 to 2011 he served as a research fellow, senior research fellow, and Queen Elizabeth II Fellow at the University of Melbourne. From 2012 to 2019 he was assistant professor in the Department of Electrical and Computer Engineering (ECE) and the Institute for Systems Research (ISR), and was also affiliated with the Applied Mathematics & Statistics, and Scientific Computation Program (AMSC), taking leave in 2018 to work in the tech industry.

== Honors and awards ==
- IEEE George S. Axelby Outstanding Paper Award (2007) for "A Characterization of Convex Problems in Decentralized Control"
- SIAM Control and Systems Theory Prize (2011) Conferred: "for Contributions to the theory of optimal controller synthesis for decentralized systems subject to information and control constraints."
- National Science Foundation (NSF) CAREER Award (2014)
- Presidential Early Career Award for Scientists and Engineers (PECASE)
