= Andrew Brooks =

American immunologist (1969–2021)

- Born: February 10, 1969; Bronxville, New York, U.S.
- Died: January 23, 2021 (aged 51); New York City, U.S.
- Education: University of Rochester School of Medicine (PhD)
- Known for: First FDA approved COVID-19 saliva-based/home-use test
- Spouse: Jill Brooks
- Children: 3
- Scientific career
- Fields: Molecular neuroscience
- Institutions: University of Medicine and Dentistry of New Jersey; RUCDR Infinite Biologics

Andrew Ira Brooks (February 10, 1969 – January 23, 2021) was an American immunologist, academic, and businessman. He was an associate research professor at Rutgers University and the developer of the first FDA-approved rapid saliva test for COVID-19 diagnosis.

== Early life ==
Brooks was born in Bronxville, New York, on February 10, 1969, to Phyllis (née Heitner) and Perry H. Brooks. His mother was a school teacher while his father was a diamond setter. He was raised in Old Bridge Township, New Jersey and later attended Cornell University, majoring in animal sciences with the intention of becoming a veterinarian. He switched his academic focus after a summer internship at Memorial Sloan Kettering and in 2000 received a PhD from University of Rochester in neuroscience.

== Career and research ==
After completing his PhD, Brooks remained at the University of Rochester, later becoming director of Medical Center Core Facilities. Four years later, he returned to New Jersey to work at Rutgers, joining the faculties of Environmental Medicine and Genetics, Environmental and Occupational Health Sciences, and Toxicology.

In 2009, Brooks began working at the Rutgers University Cell and DNA Repository (RUCDR), a university-company for data management and research analysis. He eventually became CEO of the company and it became a private entity, now called Sampled, in 2018. He was also the chief science officer for Spectrum Solutions. He was a member of the New Jersey Economic Advisory Council, and the director of the Bionomics Research and Technology Center (BRTC) at the Environmental and Occupational Health Science Institute of the University of Medicine and Dentistry of New Jersey.

For 17 years, he was director of the Harlan GeneScreen Laboratory, and as an advisor to the Food and Drug Administration.

Brooks was also both COO and director of technology of RUCDR Infinite Biologics. At RUCDR, he developed a saliva-spit test for COVID-19 as an alternative to naso- or oropharyngeal swab tests which both increased speed of results and minimized the need for medical professionals to be involved in the testing process. He used the capabilities built up to perform genetic tests through saliva and adapted the same techniques to extract the necessary RNA from the virus. The test received emergency use authorization from the FDA in April 2020, making it the first at-home test to be approved by federal authorities. In addition to designing the saliva test he commercialized the test and scaled production operations to meet the rollout demands. More than 4 million people have used the test.

He co-authored over 70 publications, with over 1000 citations in literature. In addition to his work on COVID-19, his research included investigations of the molecular mechanisms that underlie memories and learning, which involved studies on gene-environment interaction, including those in neurodegenerative diseases; as well as high throughput sample analysis and biobanking.

== Personal life ==
Brooks was married to Jil Brooks. Brooks had three daughters from two previous marriages. He was a golf enthusiast, playing often with his father and participating successfully in international tournaments as an amateur.

Brooks died of a heart attack on January 23, 2021. New Jersey Governor Phil Murphy lauded him as an "unsung hero".

== Published works ==
- Wagner, Victoria E.; Bushnell, Daniel; Passador, Luciano; Brooks, Andrew I.; Iglewski, Barbara H. (April 1, 2003). "Microarray Analysis of Pseudomonas aeruginosa Quorum-Sensing Regulons: Effects of Growth Phase and Environment". Journal of Bacteriology. 185 (7): 2080–2095. doi:10.1128/JB.185.7.2080-2095.2003. ISSN 0021-9193. PMC 151498. PMID 12644477.
- Welle, Stephen; Brooks, Andrew I.; Delehanty, Joseph M.; Needler, Nancy; Thornton, Charles A. (July 7, 2003). "Gene expression profile of aging in human muscle". Physiological Genomics. 14 (2): 149–159. doi:10.1152/physiolgenomics.00049.2003. ISSN 1094-8341. PMID 12783983.
- Yao, Pamela J; Zhu, Min; Pyun, Eunice I; Brooks, Andrew I; Therianos, Stavros; Meyers, Victoria E; Coleman, Paul D (March 1, 2003). "Defects in expression of genes related to synaptic vesicle trafficking in frontal cortex of Alzheimer's disease". Neurobiology of Disease. 12 (2): 97–109. doi:10.1016/S0969-9961(02)00009-8. ISSN 0969-9961. PMID 12667465. S2CID 13102389.
