= Andrew Brookes (cricketer) =

English cricketer

Personal information
- Full name: Andrew Phillip Brookes
- Born: 31 July 1969 (age 57); Solihull, Warwickshire, England
- Batting: Right-handed
- Bowling: Right-arm off break

Domestic team information
- Years: Team
- 1999: Warwickshire Cricket Board

Career statistics
Competition	LA
Matches	1
Runs scored	6
Batting average	–
100s/50s	–/–
Top score	6*
Balls bowled	60
Wickets	1
Bowling average	21.00
5 wickets in innings	–
10 wickets in match	–
Best bowling	1/21
Catches/stumpings	–/–
- Source: Cricinfo, 26 October 2010

Andrew Phillip Brookes (born 31 July 1969) is a former English cricketer. Brookes was a right-handed batsman who bowled right-arm off break. He was born at Solihull, Warwickshire.

Brookes represented the Warwickshire Cricket Board in a single List A match against Berkshire in the 1999 NatWest Trophy. In his only List A match, he scored an unbeaten 6 runs and took a single wicket at a cost of 21 runs.
