= Charles Brook (philanthropist) =

English businessman and philanthropist

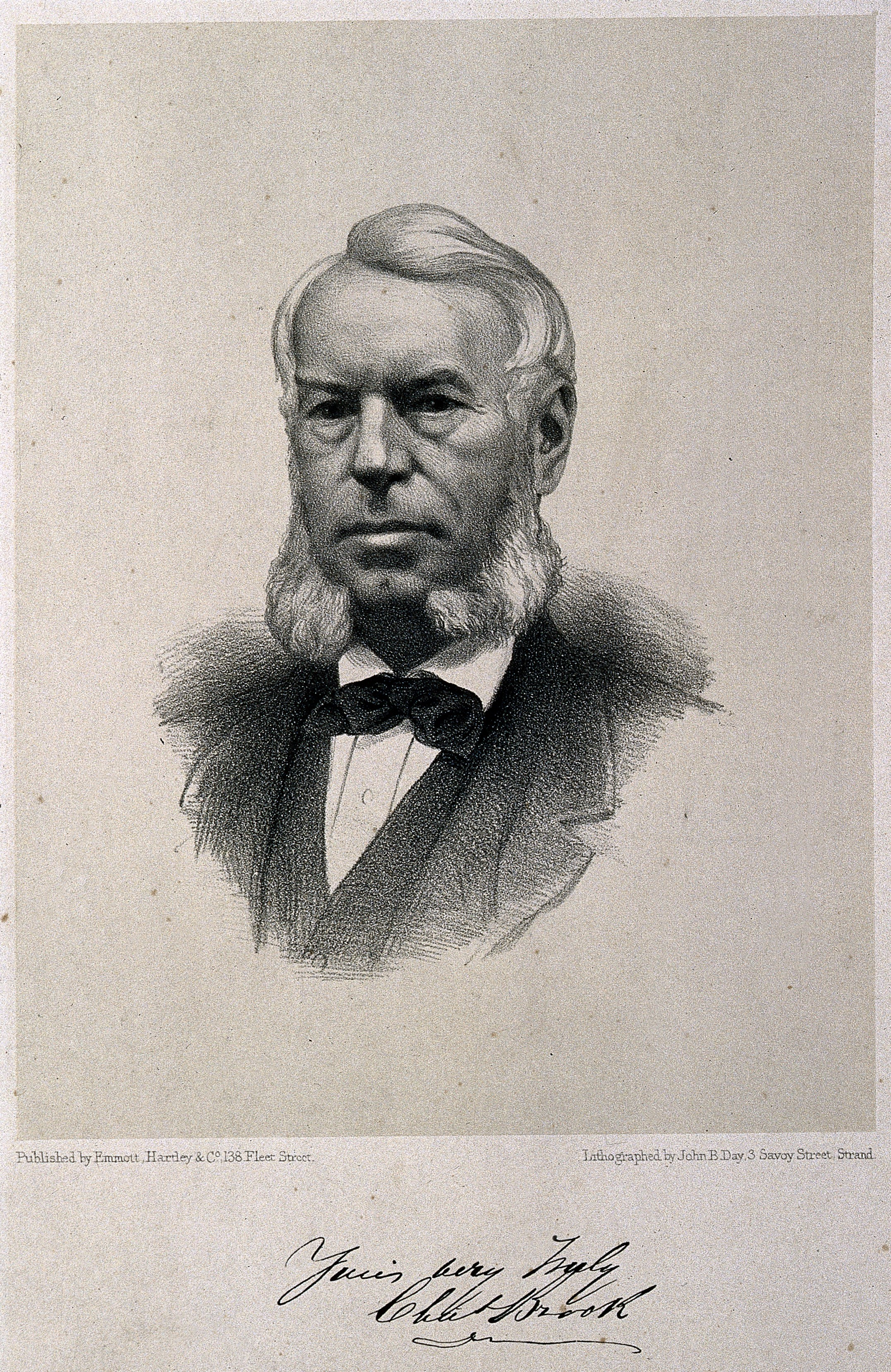
Portrait. Credit: Wellcome Library

Charles Brook (1814–1872), was an English businessman and philanthropist.

== Life ==
Brook was born 17 November 1814, in Upperhead Row, Huddersfield, West Riding of Yorkshire, England. His father, James Brook, was member of the large banking and cotton-spinning firm of Jonas Brook Brothers at Meltham.

Charles Brook lived with his father, who in 1831 had moved to Thornton Lodge; and by 1840 he became partner in the firm. He made many improvements in the machinery and showed remarkable business talents. He strenuously refused to let his goods measure fewer yards than was indicated by his labels and he was bent on promoting the welfare of the two thousand hands in his employ. He knew them nearly all by sight, went to see them when ill, and taught their children in the Sunday school which he superintended for years (Huddersfield Examiner, vol. xx. No. 1471).

He laid out a park-like retreat, which he himself planned, for his workpeople at Meltham, and built them a handsome dining-hall and concert-room, with a spacious swimming-bath underneath. His best-known gift is the Convalescent Home at Huddersfield, in the grounds of which again he was his own landscape gardener, the whole costing £40,000. He was constantly erecting or enlarging churches, schools, infirmaries, cottages, curates' houses, etc., in Huddersfield, Meltham, and the district; and on purchasing Enderby Hall, Leicestershire, in 1865, with large estates adjoining, costing £150,000, he rebuilt Enderby church and the stocking-weavers' insanitary cottages.

He died at Enderby Hall, of pleurisy and bronchitis, 10 July 1872, aged 57. A portrait of him, by Samuel Howell, is in the Huddersfield Convalescent Home.

In 1860 Brook married a daughter of John Sunderland Hirst of Huddersfield. In politics he was a conservative. Mrs Brook (died 3 February 1879) survived him; but they left no family.
