= Donna Simpson (internet celebrity) =

Heaviest woman to give birth

Donna Simpson (born 1967) is a woman who in 2008 expressed a "desire" to become one of the world's heaviest women, in competition with Susanne Eman. She wished to attain a target weight of 800 pounds (360 kg). As of June 2010, Simpson weighed 602 pounds (273 kg), down from her weight of 630 pounds (290 kg) in 2008. Simpson maintained a website where fans paid to watch her eat. In 2010, she won the Guinness World Records for the "Heaviest woman to give birth." As of 2025, she has not disclosed her weight since she had lost the 28 pounds, after getting divorced she had announced that she wanted to lose all of her weight, the goal was to be 350 pounds.

== Early life ==
Simpson grew up in Mogadore, Ohio, just outside Akron, the youngest of four children. When she was a child, her mother made big meals for her and her family. At school, she was bullied and nicknamed "fatty four-eyes". After her mother died, her father remarried. When she was nine years old, she weighed 184 lbs. Along with taking diet pills, her stepmother starved her. Her stepmother was very cruel to her. She took diet pills during her adolescence to lose weight. By the time she was eighteen, she had slimmed down to 154 pounds (70 kg). She graduated from Springfield High School in 1986.

== Personal life ==
When she was 27, she met Robert Simpson, a chef at a steak restaurant. They got married the following year. He encouraged her to eat by bringing leftovers home from work for her; Simpson said "he liked me supersized". They had a son together and subsequently divorced.

In 2006, she met Phillippe Gouamba in an online chat room for overweight women. Gouamba said: "I’ve always been attracted to big women, but Donna is my fantasy. The more she weighs, the sexier she is." They planned to get married in a ceremony at dawn on a mountain in Maui. The couple separated in 2011. They have since reconciled.

On February 13, 2007, Simpson gave birth to a baby girl named Jacqueline via cesarean section. She became the heaviest woman ever to give birth. At the time she weighed 532 pounds (241 kg). Six months after giving birth, she decided that her target weight would be 800 pounds (363 kg). However, during her pregnancy, she developed diabetes and high blood pressure. Gouamba said he supports her goal: "Gaining weight makes Donna happy and seeing her happy makes me happy." He is one of her biggest supporters in her journey to reach 1,000 pounds.

As of 2010, Simpson lived in Old Bridge Township, New Jersey and weighed 602 pounds. Her BMI was 103.9.

She has a son and a daughter.

== Eating habits ==
Simpson says her and her family's food costs US$582–$750 per week. She eats 12,000 calories per day.

To attain her goal of a 1,000 pound bodyweight, she has limited her movement.

Dr. Carla Wolper, a registered dietitian research faculty member at the New York Obesity Research Center, criticized Simpson's eating habits, saying they are self-destructive and New Jersey taxpayers will end up footing her health bills.

In late 2010, Simpson was contacted by a magazine editor who told her "they were going to buy her Christmas dinner for her family". Simpson and her family ate a 30,000-calorie Christmas dinner consisting of "two 11 kg (25 lb) turkeys, two maple-glazed hams, 6.8 kg (15 lbs) of potatoes, 4.5 kg (10 lbs) roast, 2.3 kg (5 lbs) mashed, five loaves of bread, 2.3 kg of herb stuffing, three liters of gravy, three liters of cranberry dressing and an astonishing 9 kg (20 lbs) of vegetables, and the dessert consisted of Ambrosia salad made of marshmallow, cream cheese, whipped cream and cookies. The dinner reportedly took Simpson and her family two hours to consume."

== Internet personality ==
In November 2007 Simpson launched a website. Subscribers can access photos of her body and videos of her eating and measuring her waistline. As of October 2008, she had 260 subscribers, who ranged in age from 20 to 68. She produces YouTube videos. She also goes to fat fetish websites to show off her eating habits. Thousands of her fans flock to her sites. Some send her food. She also receives hate mail from critics.

She received a book deal and a reality TV show offer.

Simpson is an advocate for the fat acceptance movement and has ridiculed "people who feel guilty about eating" as "hilarious".

== Diet ==
In August 2011, after separating from Gouamba and returning to Akron, Simpson decided to go on a diet to reduce her weight to a target of 370 pounds (170 kg) in order to become more self-sufficient and to be able to do a better job of raising her children.
