= Brownville, New Jersey =

Populated place in Middlesex County, New Jersey, US

- Census-designated place
- Location in Middlesex County and the state of New Jersey

- Location within Middlesex County, New Jersey Location within New Jersey Location within the United States
- Coordinates: 40.399361°N 74.29555°W
- Country: United States
- State: New Jersey
- County: Middlesex
- Township: Old Bridge

Area
  - Total: 1.07 sq mi (2.77 km^{2})
  - Land: 1.07 sq mi (2.77 km^{2})
  - Water: 0 sq mi (0.00 km^{2}) 0.15%
- Elevation: 66 ft (20 m)

Population (2020)
  - Total: 2,746
  - Density: 2,567.1/sq mi (991.15/km^{2})
- Time zone: UTC−05:00 (Eastern (EST))
  - Summer (DST): UTC−04:00 (Eastern (EDT))
- ZIP Code: 08857 (Old Bridge)
- Area code: 732
- FIPS code: 34-08492
- GNIS feature ID: 02389253

Brownville is an unincorporated community and census-designated place (CDP) in Old Bridge Township, Middlesex County, New Jersey, United States. As of the 2020 census, the population was 2,746, up from 2,383 in 2010.

== Geography ==
Brownville is in eastern Middlesex County, less than 2 miles (3 km) from the Monmouth County line. The community is near the center of Old Bridge Township, and the community of Old Bridge borders Brownville to the west and south. U.S. Route 9 forms the western border of Brownville; the highway leads north 5 miles (8 km) to South Amboy and south 11 miles (18 km) to Freehold. County Route 516 crosses the center of Brownville, leading west 3.5 miles (5.6 km) to Route 18 in the western part of Old Bridge and east 4 miles (6 km) to the center of Matawan. The intersection known as Cottrell Corners is in the center of the Brownville CDP.

According to the U.S. Census Bureau, the CDP has a total area of 1.07 square miles (2.77 km^{2}), of which 0.001 square miles (0.003 km^{2}), or 0.09%, are water. The community drains north toward Tennent Brook, a west-flowing tributary of the South River, part of the Raritan River watershed leading to New York Bay.

== Demographics ==
Historical population
Census	Pop.	Note	%±
2000	2,660		—
2010	2,383		−10.4%
2020	2,746		15.2%
Population sources: 2000; 2010 2020

Brownville first appeared as a census designated place in the 2000 U.S. census.

=== Racial and ethnic composition ===
Brownville CDP, New Jersey – Racial and ethnic composition Note: the US Census treats Hispanic/Latino as an ethnic category. This table excludes Latinos from the racial categories and assigns them to a separate category. Hispanics/Latinos may be of any race.
Race / Ethnicity (NH = Non-Hispanic)	Pop 2000	Pop 2010	Pop 2020	% 2000	% 2010	% 2020
White alone (NH)	2,129	1,731	1,851	80.04%	72.64%	67.41%
Black or African American alone (NH)	122	110	117	4.59%	4.62%	4.26%
Native American or Alaska Native alone (NH)	1	0	3	0.04%	0.00%	0.11%
Asian alone (NH)	215	236	291	8.08%	9.90%	10.60%
Native Hawaiian or Pacific Islander alone (NH)	0	2	1	0.00%	0.08%	0.04%
Other race alone (NH)	4	2	16	0.15%	0.08%	0.58%
Mixed race or Multiracial (NH)	33	35	102	1.24%	1.47%	3.71%
Hispanic or Latino (any race)	156	267	365	5.86%	11.20%	13.29%
Total	2,660	2,383	2,746	100.00%	100.00%	100.00%

=== 2020 census ===
As of the 2020 census, Brownville had a population of 2,746. The median age was 41.7 years. 18.5% of residents were under the age of 18 and 17.6% of residents were 65 years of age or older. For every 100 females there were 83.9 males, and for every 100 females age 18 and over there were 80.5 males age 18 and over.

99.4% of residents lived in urban areas, while 0.6% lived in rural areas.

There were 1,142 households in Brownville, of which 29.2% had children under the age of 18 living in them. Of all households, 52.8% were married-couple households, 10.9% were households with a male householder and no spouse or partner present, and 30.3% were households with a female householder and no spouse or partner present. About 25.9% of all households were made up of individuals and 11.2% had someone living alone who was 65 years of age or older.

There were 1,155 housing units, of which 1.1% were vacant. The homeowner vacancy rate was 0.5% and the rental vacancy rate was 2.4%.

=== 2010 census ===
The 2010 United States census counted 2,383 people, 1,000 households, and 659 families in the CDP. The population density was 2,379.4 people per square mile (918.7 people/km^{2}). There were 1,028 housing units at an average density of 1,026.4 units per square mile (396.3 units/km^{2}). The racial makeup was 80.19% (1,911) White, 5.04% (120) Black or African American, 0.04% (1) Native American, 10.07% (240) Asian, 0.08% (2) Pacific Islander, 1.97% (47) from other races, and 2.60% (62) from two or more races. Hispanic or Latino of any race were 11.20% (267) of the population.

Of the 1,000 households, 27.5% had children under the age of 18; 49.0% were married couples living together; 13.8% had a female householder with no husband present and 34.1% were non-families. Of all households, 28.4% were made up of individuals and 9.2% had someone living alone who was 65 years of age or older. The average household size was 2.38 and the average family size was 2.97.

19.8% of the population were under the age of 18, 6.6% from 18 to 24, 28.9% from 25 to 44, 32.4% from 45 to 64, and 12.4% who were 65 years of age or older. The median age was 41.7 years. For every 100 females, the population had 78.6 males. For every 100 females ages 18 and older there were 74.3 males.

=== 2000 census ===
As of the 2000 United States census there were 2,660 people, 1,165 households, and 709 families living in the CDP. The population density was 1,092.6 people/km^{2} (2,830 people/mi^{2}). There were 1,186 housing units at an average density of 487.1 units/km^{2} (1,262 units/mi^{2}). The racial makeup of the CDP was 84.29% White, 4.62% African American, 0.04% Native American, 8.12% Asian, 1.17% from other races, and 1.77% from two or more races. Hispanic or Latino of any race were 5.86% of the population.

There were 1,165 households, out of which 28.0% had children under the age of 18 living with them, 48.8% were married couples living together, 9.0% had a female householder with no husband present, and 39.1% were non-families. 35.2% of all households were made up of individuals, and 17.4% had someone living alone who was 65 years of age or older. The average household size was 2.28 and the average family size was 2.99.

In the CDP the population was spread out, with 21.8% under the age of 18, 4.9% from 18 to 24, 31.9% from 25 to 44, 25.1% from 45 to 64, and 16.3% who were 65 years of age or older. The median age was 40 years. For every 100 females, there were 81.1 males. For every 100 females age 18 and over, there were 76.6 males.

The median income for a household in the CDP was $61,750, and the median income for a family was $83,636. Males had a median income of $56,111 versus $44,750 for females. The per capita income for the CDP was $30,520. About 2.7% of families and 6.3% of the population were below the poverty line, including 3.3% of those under age 18 and 19.9% of those age 65 or over.
