= Cottrell Corners, New Jersey =

Populated place in Middlesex County, New Jersey, US

- Unincorporated community
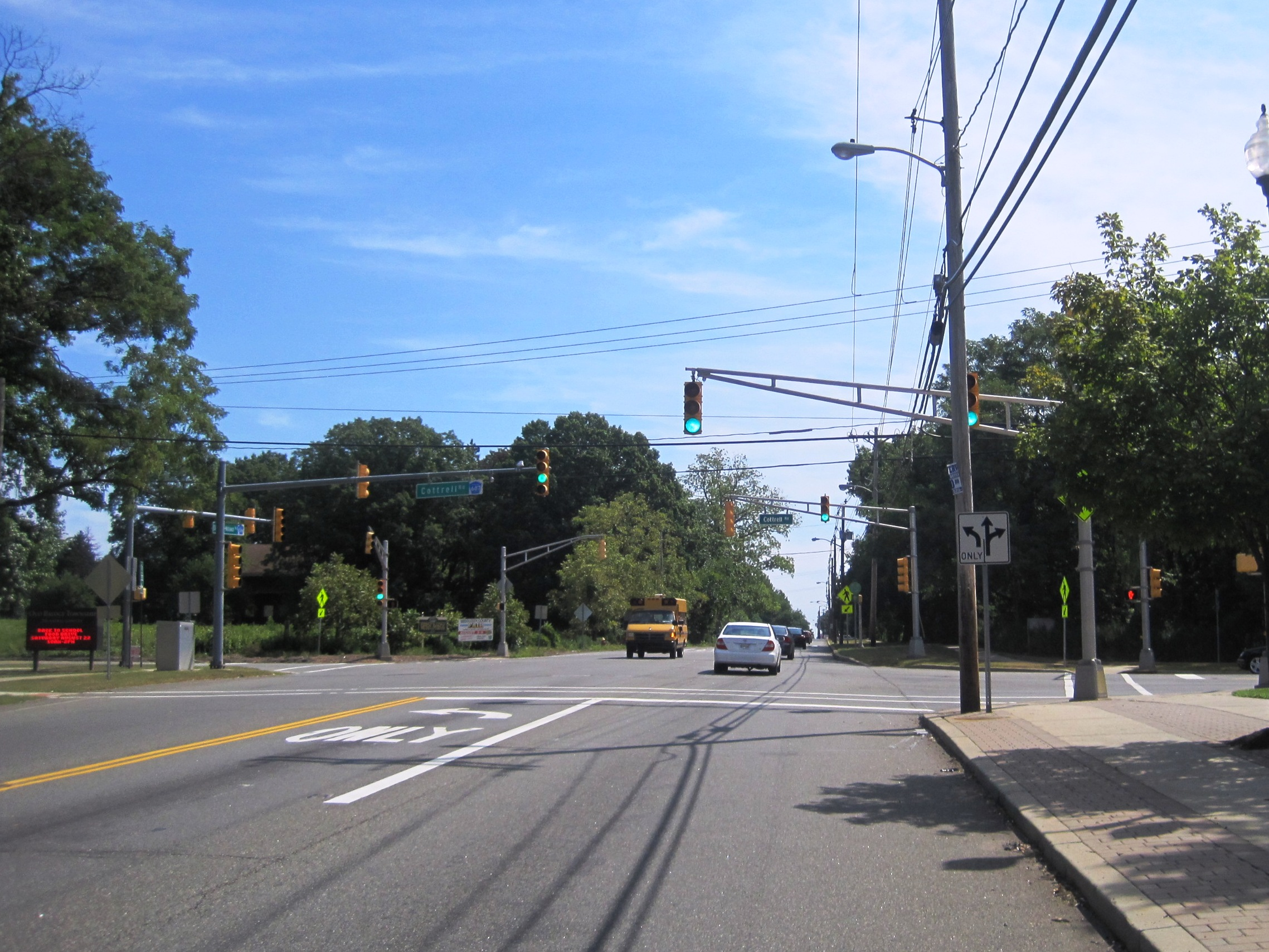
- Intersection of CR 516 and Cottrell Road

- Location of Cottrell Corners in Middlesex County Inset: Location of county within the state of New Jersey Cottrell Corners (New Jersey) Cottrell Corners (the United States)
- Coordinates: 40°24′11″N 74°17′46″W
- Country: United States
- State: New Jersey
- County: Middlesex
- Township: Old Bridge
- Elevation: 95 ft (29 m)
- GNIS feature ID: 875665

Cottrell Corners is an unincorporated community located within Old Bridge Township in Middlesex County, in the U.S. state of New Jersey. Located at the corner of Old Bridge-Matawan Road (County Route 516) and Cottrell Road, the area is named for the Cottrell Family who owned an apple farm at the crossroads since before the United States was founded. Though the last parcel of the farmland had originally been sold to a developer in 2002, the Middlesex County Freeholder Board purchased the property and intends to preserve it. In addition to the farm, the area contains stores, a townhouse development, and is the seat of the Old Bridge municipal offices and library.
