= Abraham Brook =

English bookseller and physicist

Abraham Brook (fl. 1789) was an English bookseller in Norwich, now remembered as an experimental physicist, working with electrometers and vacuum flasks.

== Works ==
He published at Norwich in 1789 a quarto volume of Miscellaneous Experiments and Remarks on Electricity, the Air Pump, and the Barometer, with a description of an Electrometer of a new construction. The work was translated into German and published at Leipzig in 1790. A paper by him, Of a new Electrometer, appeared in the Philosophical Transactions (abridg. xv. 308), 1782. Acknowledgement of Brook's practical ability is in the same volume (p. 702) in an article by William Morgan: 'I cannot conclude this paper,' he says, 'without acknowledging my obligations to the ingenious Mr. Brook of Norwich, who, by communicating to me his method of boiling mercury, has been the chief cause of my success in these experiments.'
