= George Brook (cricketer) =

English cricketer (1888–1966)

Cricket information
- Batting: Right-handed
- Bowling: Leg-break

Career statistics
Competition	First-class
Matches	150
Runs scored	1,877
Batting average	9.33
100s/50s	0/3
Top score	56
Balls bowled	24,877
Wickets	461
Bowling average	27.86
5 wickets in innings	23
10 wickets in match	4
Best bowling	7/50
Catches/stumpings	77/–
- Source: CricketArchive, 14 April 2023

George Wilfred Brook (30 August 1888 – 24 July 1966) was an English first-class cricketer who played for Worcestershire in the 1930s.

Brook had appeared for Yorkshire's Second XI as early as 1919 and also played as the professional for Bacup Cricket Club in the Lancashire League. Moving south, he played for Kidderminster Cricket Club, but it was not until 1930 that he made his first-class debut for Worcestershire, against the touring Australians at New Road. The county side were crushed by an innings and 165 runs, but Brook took four good wickets: those of Woodfull, Jackson, Bradman, and McCabe.

Brook kept his place in the Worcestershire side throughout the remainder of the 1930 season and produced a number of excellent performances: 6–80 against Nottinghamshire in early June was followed by 5–40 and 7–50 (his career best) versus Leicestershire a fortnight later. Indeed, he claimed five wickets in an innings on 12 occasions in total that summer, finishing with a fine season's return of 132 first-class wickets at 21.88 to top Worcestershire's bowling averages ahead of Fred Root.

From 1931 to 1934, Brook was a regular in the Worcestershire side, but he could never quite recapture his outstanding form of 1930: in those four years he took 81, 71, 82 and 87 wickets, with a total of 11 five-wicket hauls — one fewer than he had managed in a single season in his first summer at the county. His bowling average varied considerably, from an acceptable 24.34 in 1931 to an expensive 37.56 two years later. With the bat Brook was nothing special, but he did manage two half-centuries in 1932 and another (a career-best 56 in a high-scoring draw against Gloucestershire) in 1933.

He played only three more games for Worcestershire, in May 1935, his final wicket being that of Yorkshire's Arthur Mitchell. He then left the first-class arena for good to play for Keighley.

Brook was born in Mirfield, Yorkshire; he died in Bournemouth at the age of 77.
