= Andrew Brook (disambiguation) =

Andrew Brook (born 1943) is a Canadian philosopher.

Andrew Brook may also refer to:

- Andrew Zolile T. Brook (1929–2011), South African bishop
- Andrew Ten Brook (1814–1899), American academic

== See also ==
- Andrew Brooke, English producer and actor
- Andrew Brooks (disambiguation)
- Brook Andrew (born 1970), Australian artist
