= Andrew Brookes =

British aerospace analyst and writer

- Occupation: Journalist
- Writing career
- Genre: Aviation

Andrew J. Brookes is an English aerospace analyst, author of aviation books and aviation journalist.

== Life ==
He is a former Royal Air Force pilot, and flew 3,500 hours on strategic reconnaissance Victors, Canberras, and also the Vulcan bomber. He was a NATO Nuclear Release Officer and led an aviation safety team at the Ministry of Defence, before being appointed Commander of RAF Greenham Common cruise missile base. He has also served as Group Director at the RAF's Advanced Staff College, and co-ordinator of air power studies at the Joint Services Command and Staff College.

He was Chief Executive of the Air League from 2009 to 2018, having previously been Aerospace Analyst at the International Institute for Strategic Studies.

He is a Fellow of the Royal Aeronautical Society, and of the Royal United Services Institute, and was voted Defence Aerospace Journalist of the Year in 2004 and 2006.

== Books ==
- Photo Reconnaissance (Ian Allan, 20 June 1975: ISBN 0-7110-0570-2)
- Force V: The history of Britain's airborne deterrent (Jane's, 1982: ISBN 0-7106-0238-3)
- Fighter Squadron at War (Ian Allan, 10 November 1980: ISBN 0-7110-1083-8)
- Bomber Squadron at War (Ian Allan, April 1983, ISBN 0-7110-1279-2)
- Avro Vulcan (Ian Allan, October 1985: ISBN 0-7110-1548-1)
- Handley Page Victor (Ian Allan, 20 October 1988: ISBN 0-7110-1803-0)
- Crash! Military Aircraft Disasters, Accidents and Incidents (Ian Allan, 24 May 1991: ISBN 0-7110-1965-7)
- Disaster in the Air (Ian Allan, 24 September 1992: ISBN 0-7110-2037-X)
- Flights to Disaster (Ian Allan, 26 September 1996: ISBN 0-7110-2475-8)
- Air War over Italy (Ian Allan, 26 January 2000: ISBN 0-7110-2690-4)
- Destination Disaster (Ian Allan, 17 October 2002: ISBN 0-7110-2862-1)
- Air War over Russia (Ian Allan, 1 September 2003: ISBN 0-7110-2890-7)
- Vulcan Units of the Cold War (Osprey Publishing, 20 January 2009: ISBN 1-84603-297-0)
