= Brooke (surname) =

Brooke is a surname. Notable people with the surname include:

- Alan Brooke, 1st Viscount Alanbrooke (1883–1963), British Chief of the Imperial General Staff in WW 2
- Arthur Brooke (poet) (died 1563), English poet
- Arthur Brooke (lieutenant-general) (1772–1843), British general
- Arthur de Capell Brooke (1791–1858), British baronet and travel writer
- Arthur Brooke (entrepreneur) (1845–1918), founder of Brooke Bond tea company
- Basil Stanlake Brooke (1888–1973), 1st Viscount Brookeborough, Irish Unionist politician
- Brooke baronets, families of baronets with the surname Brooke
- Bryan Nicholson Brooke (1915–1998), English surgeon
- Cecil Brooke-Short (1897–1934), English cricketer
- Charles Brooke (Jesuit) (1777–1852), English Jesuit
- Charles Brooke (surgeon) (1804–1879), English surgeon and inventor
- Charles Anthoni Johnson Brooke (1829–1917), Second Rajah of Sarawak
- Charles Vyner Brooke (1874–1963), third and last Rajah of Sarawak
- Charlotte Brooke (writer), (c.1740–1793), Irish author
- Christopher Brooke (poet), English lawyer, author and politician
- Christopher Nugent Lawrence Brooke (1927–2015), British medieval historian
- Edward Brooke (1919–2015), American politician
- Eileen Brooke (1905–1989), British statistician and health policy professional
- Elizabeth Brooke, Lady Wyatt, alleged mistress of Henry VIII and estranged wife of the poet Thomas Wyatt
- Elisabeth Brooke, Marchioness of Northampton (died 1565), leading lady at the court of Edward VI and Elizabeth I of England
- Elizabeth Brooke (writer) (1601–1683), English religious writer
- Emily Brooke (born 1985), British inventor
- Frances Brooke (1724–1789), English novelist, essayist, playwright and translator
- Frederick H. Brooke (1876–1960), American architect from Washington, D.C.
- Garry Brooke (1960–2025), English footballer
- George Brooke (conspirator) (1568–1603), executed for his part in two plots against the government of King James I
- Graeme Brooke (born 1963), Australian boxer of the 1980s
- Gustavus Vaughan Brooke (1818–1866), Irish stage actor, active in Ireland, England and Australia
- Gwydion Brooke (1912–2005), British bassoonist
- Heather Brooke (born 1970), American journalist
- Henry Brooke (disambiguation)
- Humphrey Brooke (physician) (1617–1693), British doctor
- Humphrey Brooke (art historian) (1914–1988), British art historian
- Iris Brooke (1905–post 1967), English artist and author
- James Brooke (1803–1868), first Rajah of Sarawak
- James Brooke (born 1955), American journalist
- Jennifer Brooke (born 1993/1994), English actress
- Jocelyn Brooke (Jocelyn Bernard Brooke), writer
- Sir John Arthur Brooke, 1st Baronet of the Brooke Baronetcy of Almondbury (1844–1920)
- John Brooke (1755–1802), English politician
- John Charles Brooke (1748–1794), Somerset Herald
- John Weston Brooke (1880–1908), English Officer in the Boer War, son of John Arthur
- Jonatha Brooke (born 1964), American folk-rock singer-songwriter
- John Mercer Brooke (1826–1906), scientist
- Katharine Brooke, Lady Brooke (born 1964), British courtier
- Lola Brooke, American rapper
- Margaret Brooke, Lady Brooke, Ranee of Sarawak
- Michael Brooke (born 1952), New Zealand cricketer
- Peter Brooke, Baron Brooke of Sutton Mandeville (born 1934), British politician and son of Henry
- Peter Brooke (17th-century MP), English politician
- Peter Brooke (businessman) (1929–2020), American businessman
- Ralph Brooke (1553–1625), English Officer of Arms
- Richard Kendall Brooke (1930–1996), South African ornithologist
- Robert Brooke (disambiguation), several people
- Sir Robert Weston Brooke, 2nd Baronet of the Brooke Baronetcy of Almondbury (1885–1942)
- Rupert Brooke (1887–1915), poet
- Samuel Brooke (died 1632?), Master of Trinity College, Cambridge
- Stopford Brooke (chaplain) (1832–1916), Irish churchman and writer
- Stopford Brooke (politician) (1859–1938), British politician
- Sylvia Brett (1885–1917), Lady Brooke, Ranee of Sarawak
- Tim Brooke-Taylor (born 1940), English actor
- Sir Victor Alexander Brooke (1843–1891), 3rd Baronet, Anglo-Irish sportsman and naturalist
- Winifred M. A. Brooke (1893–1975), British botanist, illustrator and author
- Zachary Brooke (theologian) (1716–1788), English clergyman and academic
- Zachary Nugent Brooke, (1883–1946), British medieval historian and writer
- Zinzan Brooke (born 1965), New Zealand rugby player
