= Charles Brooks =

Charles Brooks may refer to:

- Charles Brooks (cartoonist) (1920–2011), American editorial cartoonist
- Charles Brooks (cricketer) (1927–2002), English cricketer
- Charles Brooks (trade unionist) (1915–1977), Canadian labour union activist
- Charles Brooks Jr. (1942–1982), American murderer executed in Texas
- Tony Brooks (racing driver) (Charles Anthony Standish Brooks, 1932–2022), British race car driver
- Charles E. P. Brooks, English meteorologist, for whom Cape Brooks, Antarctica, was named
- Charles L. Brooks III, American theoretical and computational biophysicist
- Charlie Brooks (racehorse trainer) (Charles Patrick Evelyn Brooks, born 1963), British racehorse trainer
- Charlie Brooks (cyclist) (1881–1937), British cyclist, also known as Colin Brooks
- Charlie Brooks (footballer) (1911–1980), English footballer
- Charles Timothy Brooks (1813–1883), American poet and Unitarian minister
- C. Wayland Brooks (1897–1957), United States senator from Illinois
- Shirley Brooks (Charles William Shirley Brooks, 1816–1874), British journalist and novelist
- Charles B. Brooks (1865–1908), African-American inventor

== See also ==
- Charles Brook (disambiguation)
- Charles Brooke (disambiguation)
- Charlie Brooker (born 1971), British satirist and writer
- Charlie Brooks (born 1981), British actress
- Charlee Brooks (born 1988), American vocalist, composer, and audio engineer
- Charles Brooks House, historic house in Medford, Massachusetts
- Charles Brooks Peace Fountain, in Coventry Gardens park, Windsor, Ontario, Canada
