= Henry Brooke =

Henry Brooke may refer to:

- Henry Cobham (diplomat) (1537–1592), real name Henry Brooke, MP for Kent
- Henry Brooke, 11th Baron Cobham (1564–1618), English peer, Lord Warden of the Cinque Ports and Lord Lieutenant of Kent, plotter against James I
- Sir Henry Brooke, 1st Baronet (died 1664), English soldier and Sheriff of Cheshire
- Henry Brooke (Irish politician) (1671–1761), Irish MP for Dundalk and Fermanagh
- Henry Brooke (divine) (1694–1757), English schoolmaster and divine
- Henry Brooke (writer) (1703–1783), Irish novelist and dramatist
- Henry Brooke (artist) (1738–1806), Irish painter
- Henry Vaughan Brooke (1743–1807), Irish MP for Donegal Borough and County, British MP for Donegal
- Henry James Brooke (1771–1857), English crystallographer
- William Henry Brooke (1772–1860), Irish painter and illustrator
- Henry Francis Brooke (1838–1880), Irish Brigadier-General in the British Army
- Henry Brooke, Baron Brooke of Cumnor (1903–1984), British life peer and Conservative Party politician
- Henry Brooke (judge) (1936–2018), British former Lord Justice of Appeal

== See also ==
- Henry Brooks (disambiguation)
- Harry Brooks (disambiguation)
