= Charles Brooke =

Charles Brooke may refer to:

- Charles Brooke (surgeon) (1804–1879), English surgeon and inventor
- Charles Brooke, Rajah of Sarawak (1829–1917), head of state of Sarawak, Borneo
- Charles Brooke (Jesuit) (1777–1852), English Jesuit
- Charles Vyner Brooke (1874–1963), third and last White Rajah of Sarawak

== See also ==
- Charles Brook (disambiguation)
- Charles Brooks (disambiguation)
