= Charles Brook =

Charles Brook may refer to:

- Charles Brook, Newfoundland and Labrador, a settlement in Newfoundland and Labrador, Canada
- Charles Brook (philanthropist) (1814–1872), English businessman and philanthropist
- Charles Wortham Brook (1901–1983), London GP and member of the London County Council
- Charles Brook (cricketer) (1901–1976), Argentine cricketer

== See also ==
- Charles Brooke (disambiguation)
- Charles Brooks (disambiguation)
