= Humphrey Brooke =

Humphrey Brooke may refer to:

- Humphrey Brooke (art historian) (1914–1988), British art historian
- Humphrey Brooke (physician) (1617–1693), English physician
