= Robert Brooks =

Robert, Bob or Bobby Brooks may refer to:

== Business ==
- Robert A. Brooks (1932–2000), American telecommunications entrepreneur
- Robert H. Brooks (1937–2006), founder of Hooters of America
- Robert Brooks, chairman of English auction house Bonhams

== Entertainment ==
- Bob Brooks (film director) (1927–2012), American film director
- Robert Green Brooks (born 1957), American music producer also known as Bobby Brooks
- Bobby Brooks (died 1990), musical agent who was killed along with Stevie Ray Vaughan
- Robert Brooks, bassist of the English band Sunhouse

== Politics ==
- Robert Brooks (MP) (1790–1882), British Conservative Party politician, businessman and trader
- Robert Brooks (Wisconsin politician) (born 1965), American politician and businessman
- Robert Brooks (Pennsylvania politician), American Republican politician
- Bob Brooks (Pennsylvania politician), American Democratic politician
- Robert Brooks, British Member of Parliament for Weymouth and Melcombe Regis
- Robert Brooks, Canadian politician, known as Glenn Brooks
- Bob Brooks (Florida politician) (born 1953), American politician from Florida

== Sports ==
- Bobby Brooks (baseball) (1945–1994), American baseball player
- Bobby Brooks (defensive back) (born 1951), American football player
- Bobby Brooks (linebacker) (born 1976), American football linebacker
- Robert Brooks (American football) (born 1970), American football wide receiver
- Robert Brooks (cricketer) (born 1970), former English cricketer
- Robert Edward Brooks (born 1966), British professional wrestler, known by the ring name Robbie Brookside
- Bob Brooks (basketball), American basketball player

== Others ==
- Robert Preston Brooks (1881–1961), American academic studying Georgia, US
- Robert Angus Brooks (1920–1976), American philologist and military official
- Robert W. Brooks (1952–2002), American mathematician
- Robert H. Brooks (soldier) (1915–1941), American soldier
- Robert Cyril Claude Brooks (1930–1944), Canadian WWII soldier
- Robert L. Brooks (1980/1–2024), black American killed in prison

== See also ==
- Robert Brooke (disambiguation)
- Rob Brooks, American ice hockey team owner
- Brook Roberts (born 1983), Miss Oregon 2004
- Brooks Nunatak, Antarctic landmark, named for biologist Robert E. Brooks
- Robert Brooks Homes, Chicago housing project, part of ABLA
