= Henry Brooks =

Henry Brooks may refer to:

- Henry Jamyn Brooks (1839–1925), British painter
- Henry Luesing Brooks (1905–1971), United States federal judge
- Henry Sands Brooks (1772–1833), American clothier

== See also ==
- Harry Brooks (disambiguation)
- Henry Brook (disambiguation)
