= Harry Brooks =

Harry Brooks may refer to:

- Harry Brooks (composer) (1895–1970), American jazz composer, pianist and songwriter
- Harry Brooks (politician) (born 1945), Tennessee state representative
- Harry J. Brooks (1903–1928), American test pilot
- Harry W. Brooks, Jr., general of the 25th Infantry Division (United States)

== See also ==
- Harry Brookes Allen (1854–1926), Australian pathologist
- Harry George Brookes (1934–2011), Australian politician
- Harry Brook (born 1999), English cricketer
- Harold Brooks (disambiguation)
- Henry Brooks (disambiguation)
- Henry Brooke (disambiguation)
