= Coventry Gardens =

Park in Windsor, Ontario, Canada

Coordinates: 42.32877°N 82.9811°W

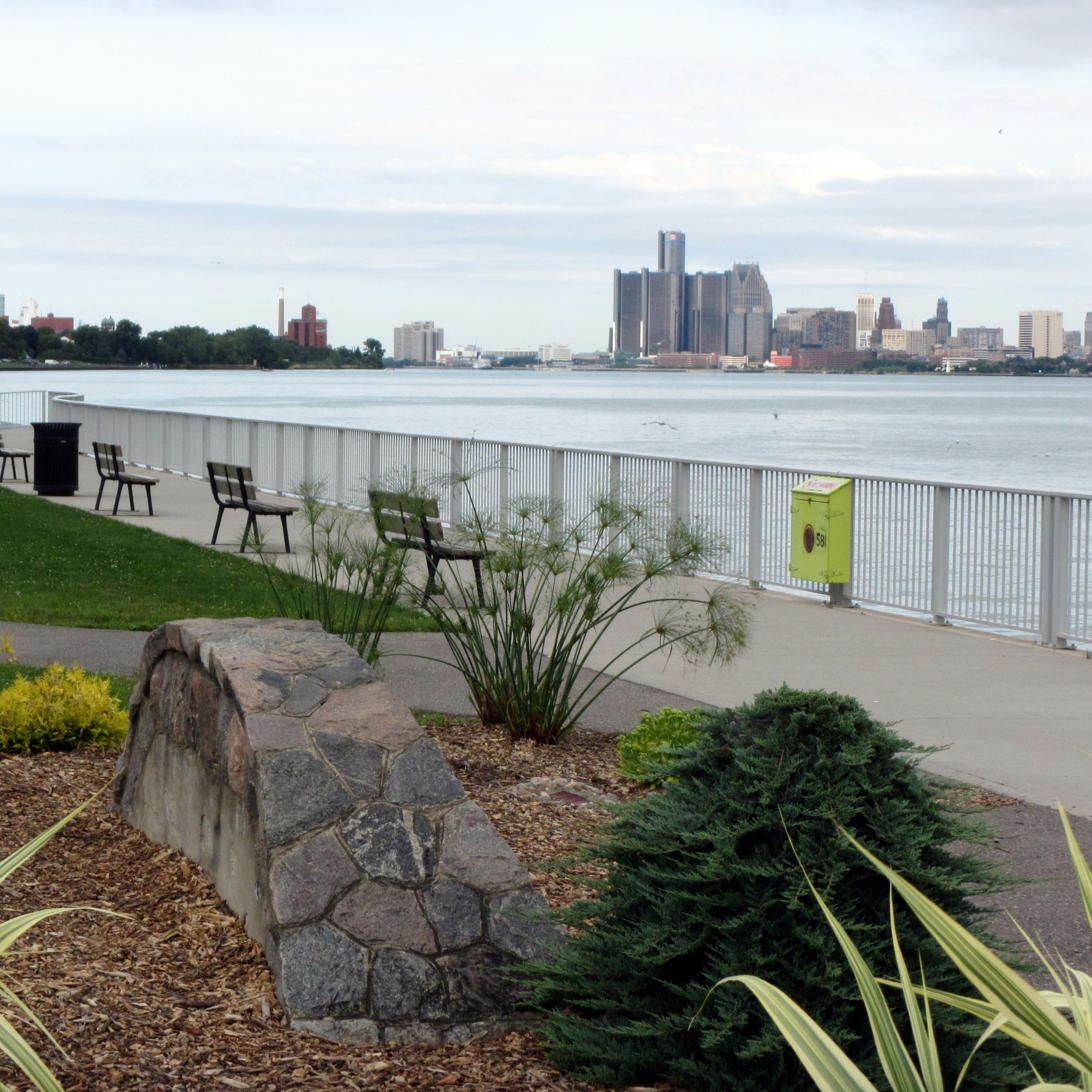
View of Detroit from Coventry Gardens

Coventry Gardens (Reaume Park) is a park in Windsor, Ontario, Canada, on Riverside Drive, in the Pillette Village. It contains the Charles Brooks Peace Fountain that floats on the Detroit River mainly in summer. Across the Detroit river to the north is Detroit's Belle Isle Park (Michigan).

The park is often filled with spectators of the annual fireworks of the Windsor–Detroit International Freedom Festival that usually takes place between July 1, Canada Day and July 4, Independence Day.

The park was completed in 1931 and was named after Joseph L. Reaume, its benefactor. The park has several historic memorials to noted events in the Windsor area. In 1975 the park was expanded from 4.7 acres (19,000 m^{2}) to 7 acres (28,000 m^{2}) of land.

== See also ==
- Parks in the city of Windsor, Ontario
