= Robert Watt (bibliographer) =

Scottish physician and bibliographer

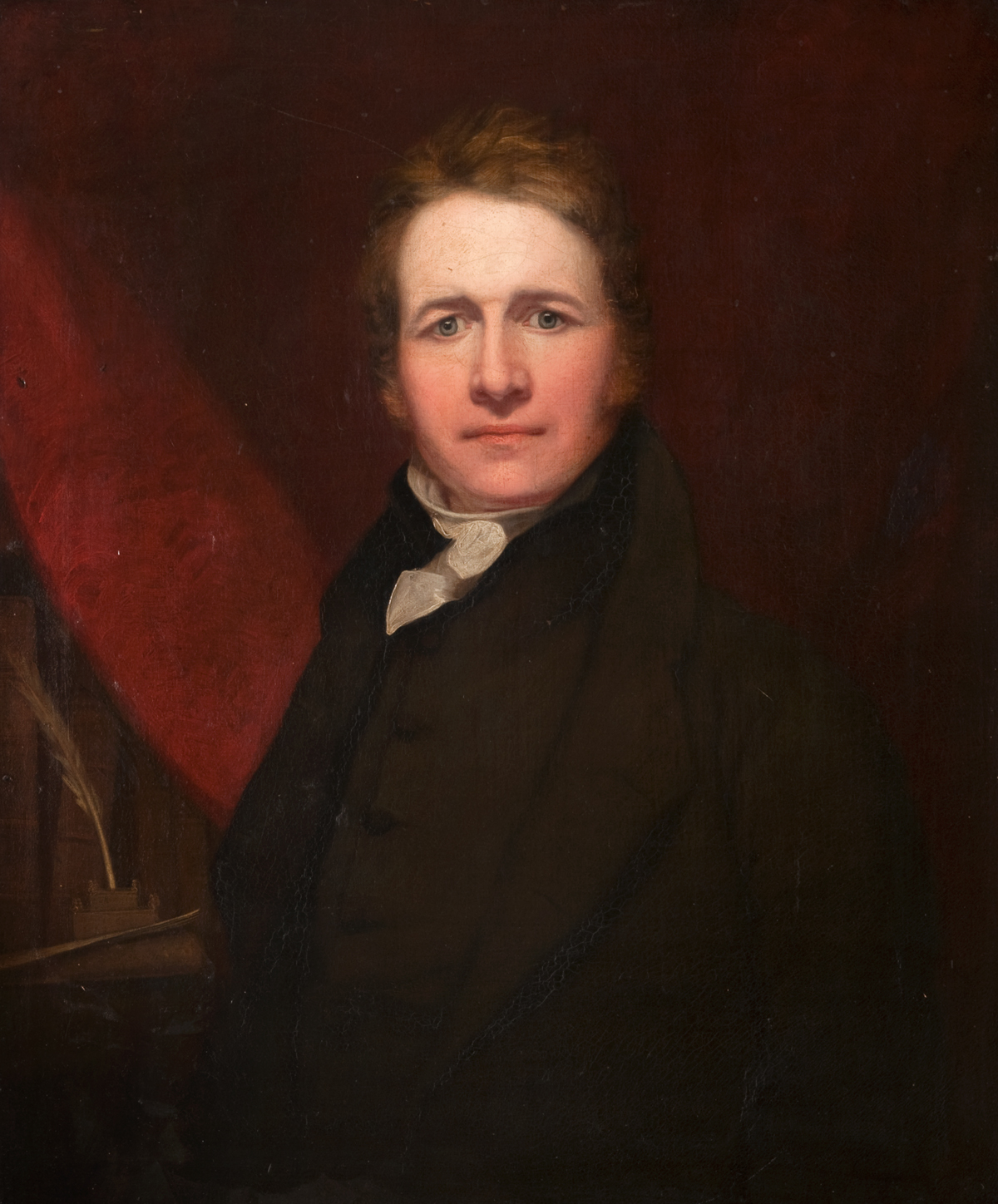
Robert Watt by Henry Raeburn

Robert Watt (bapt. 1 May 1774 – 12 March 1819) was a Scottish physician and bibliographer.

== Early life ==
The son of a small farmer in Bonnyton near Stewarton in Ayrshire, Watt attended school from the age of six to twelve. After working as a ploughman, aged seventeen he went to learn cabinetmaking with his brother. Forming the ambition to go to Glasgow University, Watt was given tuition by a local schoolmaster and managed to enter Glasgow University in 1793, transferring to Edinburgh University in 1795. After briefly considering the ministry, he graduated with a Licence in medicine in 1799 and took up a medical practice in Paisley.

== Medical career ==
By 1800 he was publishing papers in the Medical and Physical Journal, and he continued to publish medical articles until 1814. A founding member of the Paisley Medical Society in 1806, he was admitted a full member of the Glasgow Faculty of Physicians and Surgeons in 1807 and thereafter built his reputation as a Glasgow physician. From 1814 to 1816 he was President of the Faculty, and he was a founding member and first president of the Glasgow Medical Society. Watt published two books and several papers on medicine: his 1813 Inquiry into child mortality (after two of his children had died from whooping cough) concluded that smallpox vaccination had impacted on smallpox mortality, but not on overall child mortality. However, he gave up medical practice due to ill-health in 1817 and his lasting reputation rests on his work as a bibliographer.

== Bibliotheca Britannica ==
Watt's first bibliographical publication was a catalogue (1812) of his own medical library. Bibliotheca Britannica was a much more extravagantly ambitious project: "A General Index on the Literature of Great Britain and Ireland Ancient and Modern including Such Foreign Books as have been translated into English or printed in the British Dominions, as also a copious selection from the writings of the most distinguished authors of all ages and nations."

Watt died in 1819, but lived to see the book mostly completed and printing begun. The support of Thomas Chalmers, James Ewing, George Jardine and Ralph Whitelaw was enlisted to ensure that publication would be completed. A complete edition in four large quarto volumes was seen through the press by 1824: volumes one and two were an alphabetical author index, and volumes three and four a subject index. Over 40,000 authors were covered, and some periodical literature was also indexed. Paisley Public Library holds a manuscript of Bibliotheca Britannica in 57 folio volumes.

== Works ==
- Cases of Diabetes, Consumption, etc., with Observations on the History and Treatment of Disease in General, 1808
- Catalogue of Medical Books for the Use of Students Attending Lectures on the Principles and Practice of Medicine, Glasgow, 1812
- Treatise on the History, Nature and Treatment of Chincough... to which is subjoined an Inquiry into the Relative Mortality of the Principal Diseases of Children, Glasgow, 1813.
- The Rule of Life, 1814
- Bibliotheca Britannica or a general index of British and foreign literature. Edinburgh, Constable, 1824. Four volumes.
