= Harold Brooks =

Harold Brooks may refer to:

- Harold E. Brooks (born 1959), American atmospheric scientist
- Tina Brooks (Harold Brooks, 1932–1974), American hard bop tenor saxophonist and composer
- Slicker Parks (1895–1978), American baseball player, who played under the name Harold Brooks

== See also ==
- Harold Brooks-Baker (1933–2005), American-British financier, journalist and publisher, and self-proclaimed expert on genealogy
- Harold Brook (1921–1998), English footballer
- Harry Brooks (disambiguation)
