= Peace Fountain (disambiguation) =

The Peace Fountain is a sculpture and fountain in the Morningside Heights section of Manhattan in New York City.

Peace Fountain may also refer to:

- Peace Fountain (Hiroshima), in Hiroshima Peace Memorial Park
- Charles Brooks Peace Fountain, in Coventry Gardens, aka Reaume Park, in Windsor, Ontario
