= Henry Brooke (divine) =

Henry Brooke (1694 – 21 August 1757) was an English schoolmaster and cleric.

== Life ==
Brooke was a son of William Brooke, merchant, and his wife Elizabeth Holbrook, who were married at Manchester Church in 1678–9. He was educated at Manchester Grammar School, and gained an exhibition 1715–18. He proceeded to Oriel College, Oxford, where he graduated MA on 30 April 1720. He was DCL in 1727.

Brooke, then a fellow of Oriel, was made headmaster of Manchester Grammar School in September 1727. He obtained a mandamus from the crown to elect him a fellow of the collegiate church, and was elected in 1728, in spite of Tory opposition. He appears to have been on good terms with John Byrom, but he was unsuccessful as a master, and the feoffees of the school reduced his salary from £200 to £10.

In 1730 he received the Oriel College living of Tortworth in Gloucestershire. Here he lived, after resigning the mastership of the school in 1749, until his death on 21 August 1757. He was married, and had one daughter. Brooke left his library for the use of his successors at Tortworth. A portrait of him, as late as 1830, was at Mr. Hulton's, of Blackley.

== Works ==
He published The Usefulness and Necessity of studying the Classicks, a speech spoken at the breaking-up of the Free Grammar School in Manchester, Thursday, 13 Dec. 1744. By Hen. Brooke, A.M., High Master of the said School. Manchester, printed by R. Whitworth, Bookseller, MDCCLXIV (a misprint for 1744). This tract is reprinted by Whatton. Another of his works, The Quack Doctor, published in 1745, is described as very poor doggerel, with ironically laudatory notes, probably written by Robert Thyer or the Rev. John Clayton. A Latin tract, Medicus Circumfaraneus, is perhaps a translation of the preceding. Robert Watt attributed to him two sermons dated to 1746 and 1747. His best known book is A Practical Essay concerning Christian Peaceableness, which went through three editions in 1741. The third edition contains some additional matter.
