= Grange Academy, Kilmarnock =

Grange Academy Acadamaidh Grange
- School badge

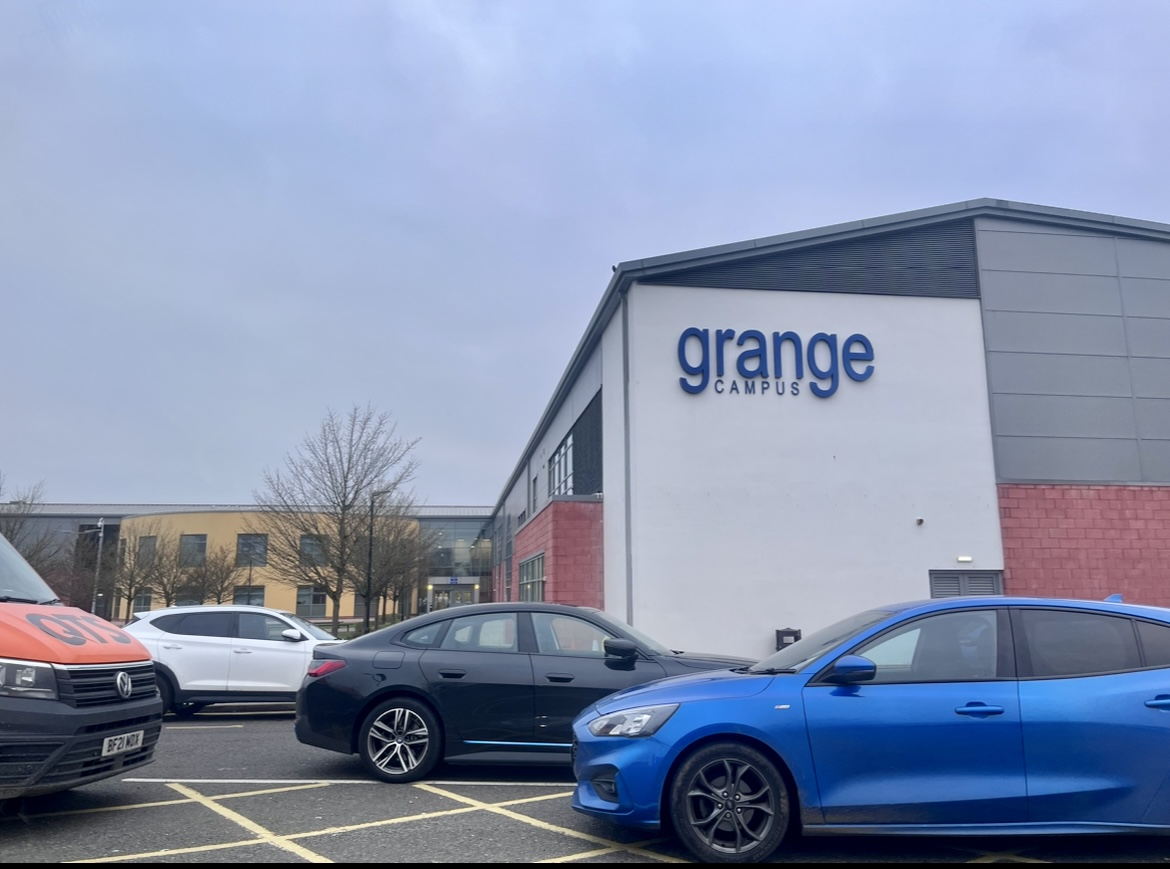
- Front entrance view of Grange Academy, November 2024

Location
- Grange Campus, Beech Avenue, Kilmarnock, East Ayrshire, Scotland, KA1 2EW; 55.60664°N 4.51388°W

Information
- Type: 11–18 non–denominational state-funded comprehensive school
- Motto: Bono Animo Esto (Be Of Good Courage)
- Established: 1966
- Local authority: East Ayrshire Council
- Head Teacher: Scott Robertson
- Secondary years taught: S1–S6
- Gender: Boys and girls
- Age: 11 to 18
- Enrolment: 1,289 as of December 2021
- Houses: Bruce, Douglas, Graham, Hamilton
- Colour
- Website: Grange Academy

Grange Academy (Scottish Gaelic: Acadamaidh Grange) is an 11–18 non-denominational secondary school based in Kilmarnock in East Ayrshire, Scotland. It serves the Bonnyton and town centre areas of the town, with the associated primaries being Crosshouse Primary, Annanhill Primary, Hillhead Primary, Gargieston Primary and Shortlees Primary.

The current school estate was constructed in 2007, with the new campus, Grange Campus, opening in 2008 which also houses Annanhill Primary School and Park School. The current Head Teacher, Scott Robertson, took up post in March 2022 following the retirement of Robert Johnston. Scott Robertson is also the head of the wider Grange Campus.

In 2022, Grange Academy was ranked as 202nd best performing state school in Scotland, an increase from 254th in the 2021 league table rankings.

== History ==
=== Establishment and catchment ===
The original Grange Academy opened to pupils and staff in August 1966 and closed in June 2008 following the construction of a new campus. The new Grange Academy building was temporarily closed for internal renovations in 2013.

Although Grange Academy serves the catchment areas of Bonnyton, town centre, Gargieston, Shortlees, Hillhead, Longpark and Crosshouse areas of Kilmarnock, the school has also served pupils from other areas across Ayrshire from primary schools including Beith (in Beith, North Ayrshire, Moorpark (Irvine, North Ayrshire), Struthers (Troon), Kilmaurs, Onthank (Kilmarnock), West, Kingcase (Prestwick), Sacred Heart (Girvan), Whatriggs (Kilmarnock), Loanhead (Kilmarnock) and St Andrews (Kilmarnock) primaries. These pupils would have been admitted to the school based upon successful placing requests as their residence and primary school is outwith the catchment area of Grange Academy.

=== Grange Campus ===
In September 2008, the new Grange Campus was completed and incorporated Grange Academy, Annanhill Primary School and Park School. The opening of the campus was pushed back from August 2008 to October 2008. The Grange Campus provides home to three schools; namely Annanhill Primary School, Grange Academy and Park School, which educates children with special needs. The teaching spaces are separate, but the games hall, assembly hall and dining area are shared. Built as a public-private partnership, the building was designed by Glasgow-based Archial Architects and constructed by a consortium, led by German contractor Hochtief, with two Paisley-based companies; Barr Construction and McLaughlin & Harvey.

Completed in 2008, the site provides an education for up to 1800 pupils. Grange Academy is a six-year non-denominational secondary school with a roll is 1203 pupils and 80 staff (2015). The campus has its own dedicated police officer.

The former Grange Academy building, opened in 1966, was demolished soon after the completion of the new school building in order to allow the construction and erection of new pitches and open area for pupils.

Grange Academy plays host to a SRU 'School of Rugby'. In 2012, the school was selected as the Ayrshire base for the Scottish Football Association's Performance Schools, a system devised to support the development of the best young talented footballers across the country (there are seven such schools across Scotland). As of 2018, the dedicated coach for the young players at Grange Academy is James Grady.

=== Capacity concerns ===
Despite being a recent educational investment and new programme for building undertaken by East Ayrshire Council, in 2021 there were reports of Grange Academy and the wider Grange Campus being overcrowded and operating above the agreed capacity of students. Pupils in Annanhill Primary, also located within the Grange Campus, have claimed they feel unsafe, with claims of primary pupils having to share toilets with those attending the secondary school (Grange Academy). Due to the overcrowding, pupils from Annanhill Primary had to be taught in four classrooms housed in Grange Academy, meaning they also had to share other facilities such as toilet accommodations. In order to address concerns, East Ayrshire Council, the local authority in charge of the schools operations, have limited the pupil intake at Annanhill Primary in 2021 to address overcrowding and over capacity concerns, and also approved plans for the construction of two new modular classrooms for Annanhill Primary School. The overall Grange campus has a capacity of 1,860 pupils, but in 2021 there were 1,953 pupils across the campus. Annanhill Primary has capacity for 459 pupils but the school had 526 in 2021.

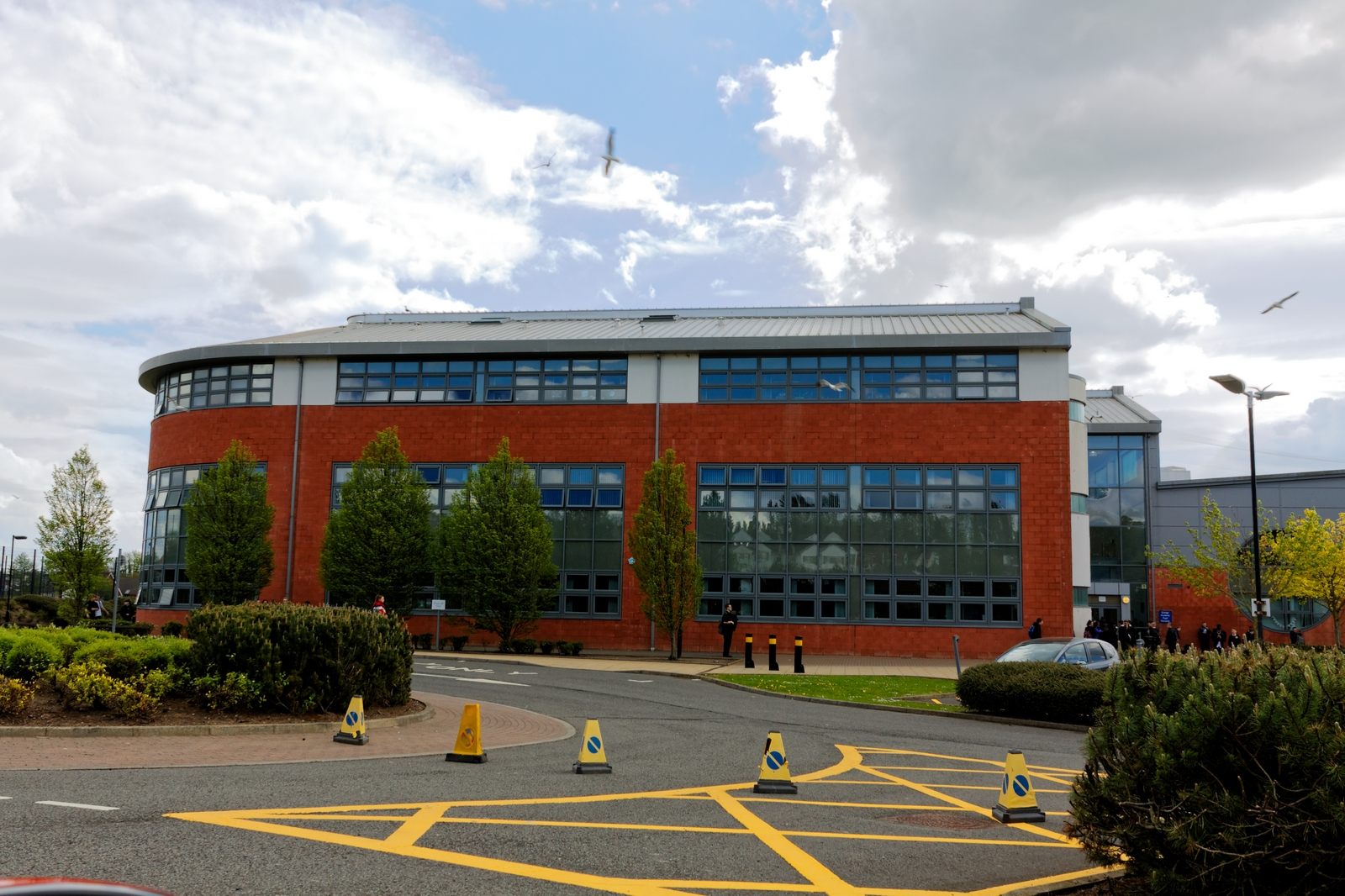
A section of one of the schools main teaching blocks

A spokesperson for East Ayrshire Council addressed the issue, saying "The School Estate Management Plan (SEMP) has highlighted capacity issues within Grange Academy on an annual basis over a number of years, and it would be prudent to consider a more sustainable option, that safeguards the campus occupancy levels in the longer term."

=== Head of Campus post ===
Following the retirement of Robert Johnston from the post of Head Teacher, East Ayrshire Council appointed Scott Robertson, Head Teacher at nearby Loudoun Academy to succeed Johnston in the post of Head Teacher. As part of the appointment, as well as being Head Teacher of Grange Academy, Robertson shall be the Head of Campus, with direct responsibility for the daily operation of Grange Campus which includes Annanhill Primary School and Park School. A similar arrangement is in place at another East Ayrshire school, Robert Burns Academy, where the Head Teacher of the secondary school is also Head of Campus (Barony Campus) in Cumnock.

Scott Robertson was released from his duties as Head Teacher at Loudoun Academy on 5 March 2022 to take up the post at Grange Academy, allowing for a period of transition between him and Johnston before Johnston retired at the start of the Easter holidays.

== Attainment and achievement ==
In 2022, Grange Academy ranked as the second best performing school in East Ayrshire based on the number of pupils attaining five higher SQA qualifications, with 38% of pupils achieving this. The school tied with Kilmarnock Academy who also had 38% of their pupils achieving five or more higher qualifications. In the same year, Grange Academy ranked 202 in the best performing schools in Scotland academically.

== School motto ==
The motto for Grange Academy which is displayed on the school badge is ‘Bono Animo Esto’ which means ‘Be of Good Courage’. This, the school says, is an encouragement for pupils to go about their lives in a spirit of positivity and grit which reflects the school ethos and underpins the core values of the school which are Respect, Responsibility, Resilience, Excellence and Ambition.

== SFA Performance School ==
Grange Academy is home to the Scottish Football Association (SFA) performance school, one of seven schools in Scotland that have been operating since 2012 with the aim to support the development of Scotland's best young footballing talent. The Performance Schools programme is designed to give talented boys and girls, with the best potential to develop their abilities, the opportunity to practise football everyday within an educational environment.

Footballer Billy Gilmour previously attended Grange Academy and the SFA Performance School for four years between 2013 and 2017.

== Notable former pupils ==
- Billy Gilmour, attended the SFA Academy at Grange, currently plays for SSC Napoli
- Harry Cochrane, Scottish footballer
- Zoë Strachan, author
