= Bonnyton, East Ayrshire =

Coordinates: 55.61°N 04.52°W

Bonnyton: Scottish Gaelic: Bonnyton; Scots: Bonnietoun
- Neighbourhood and former village
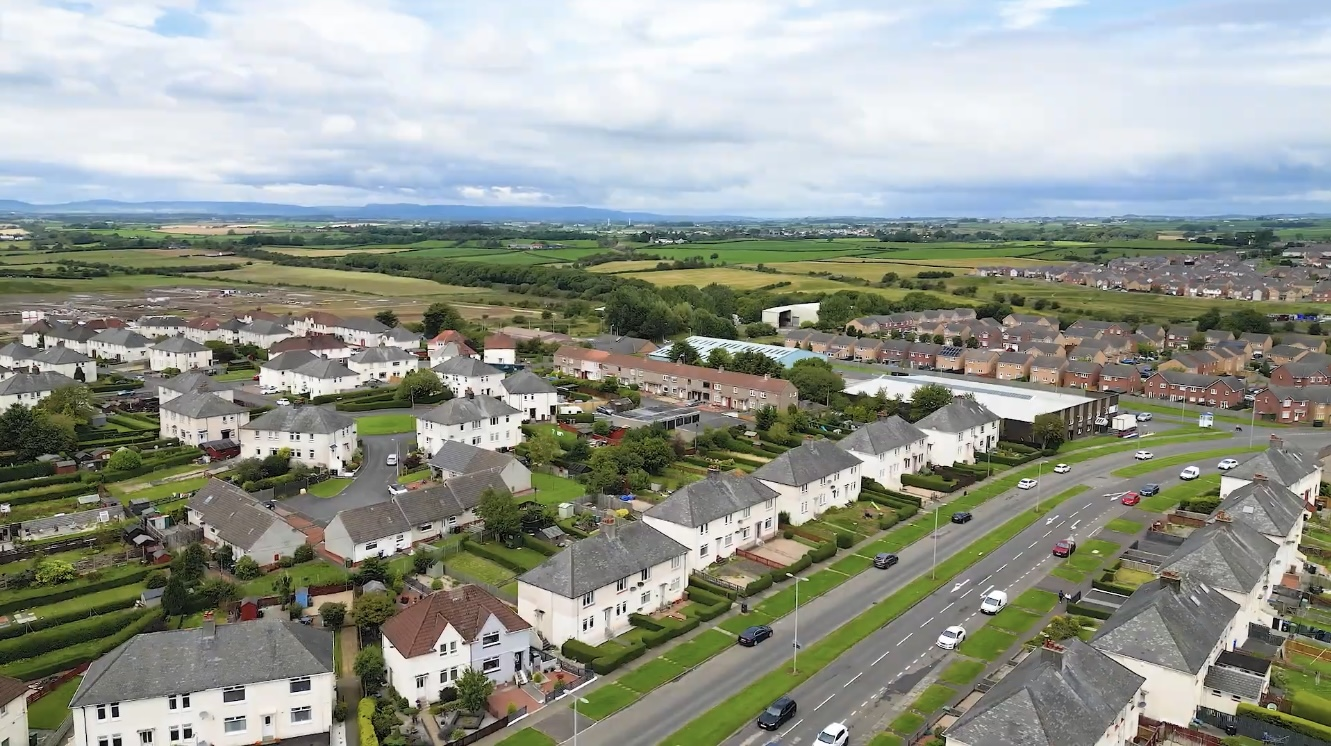
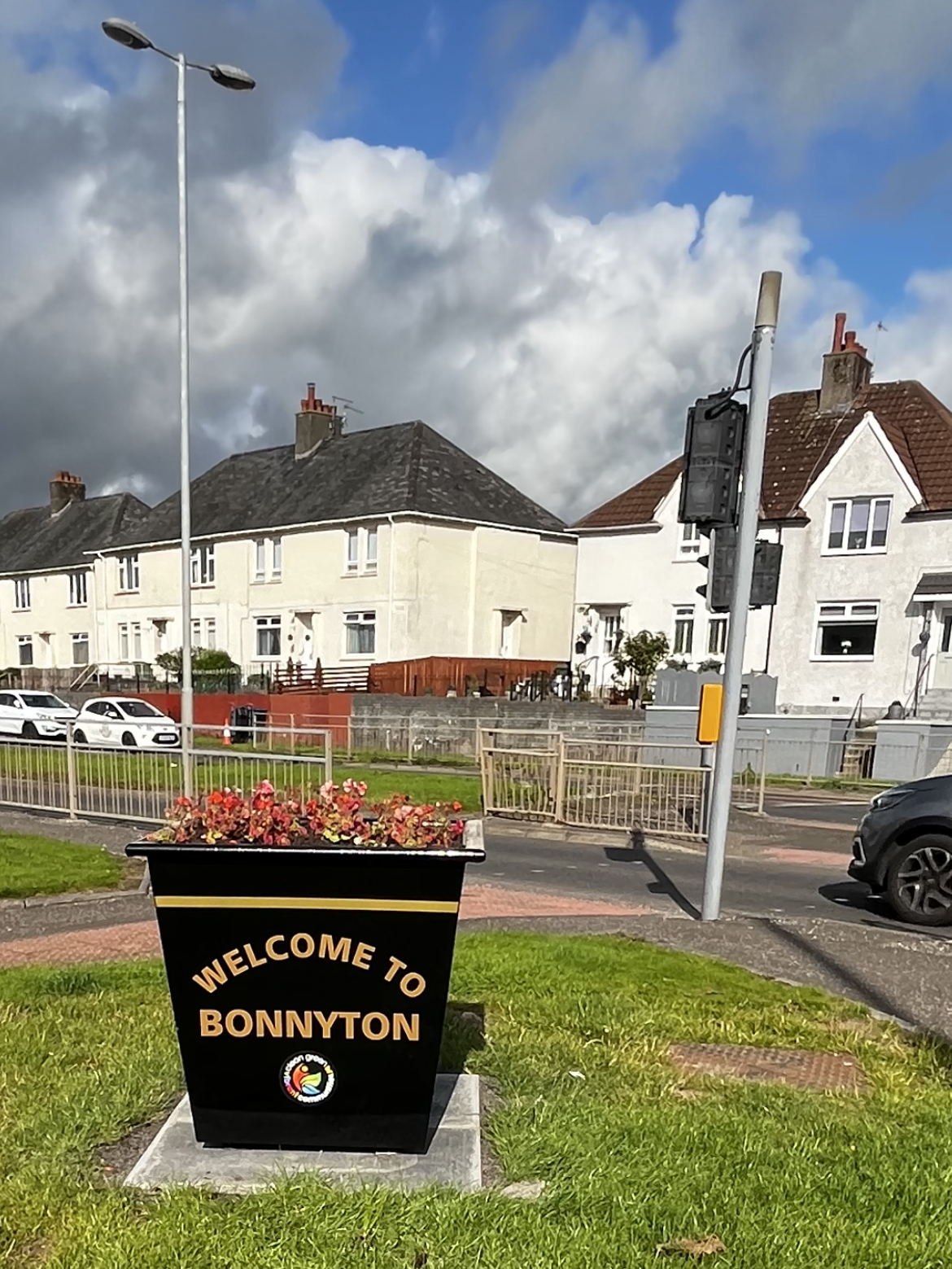
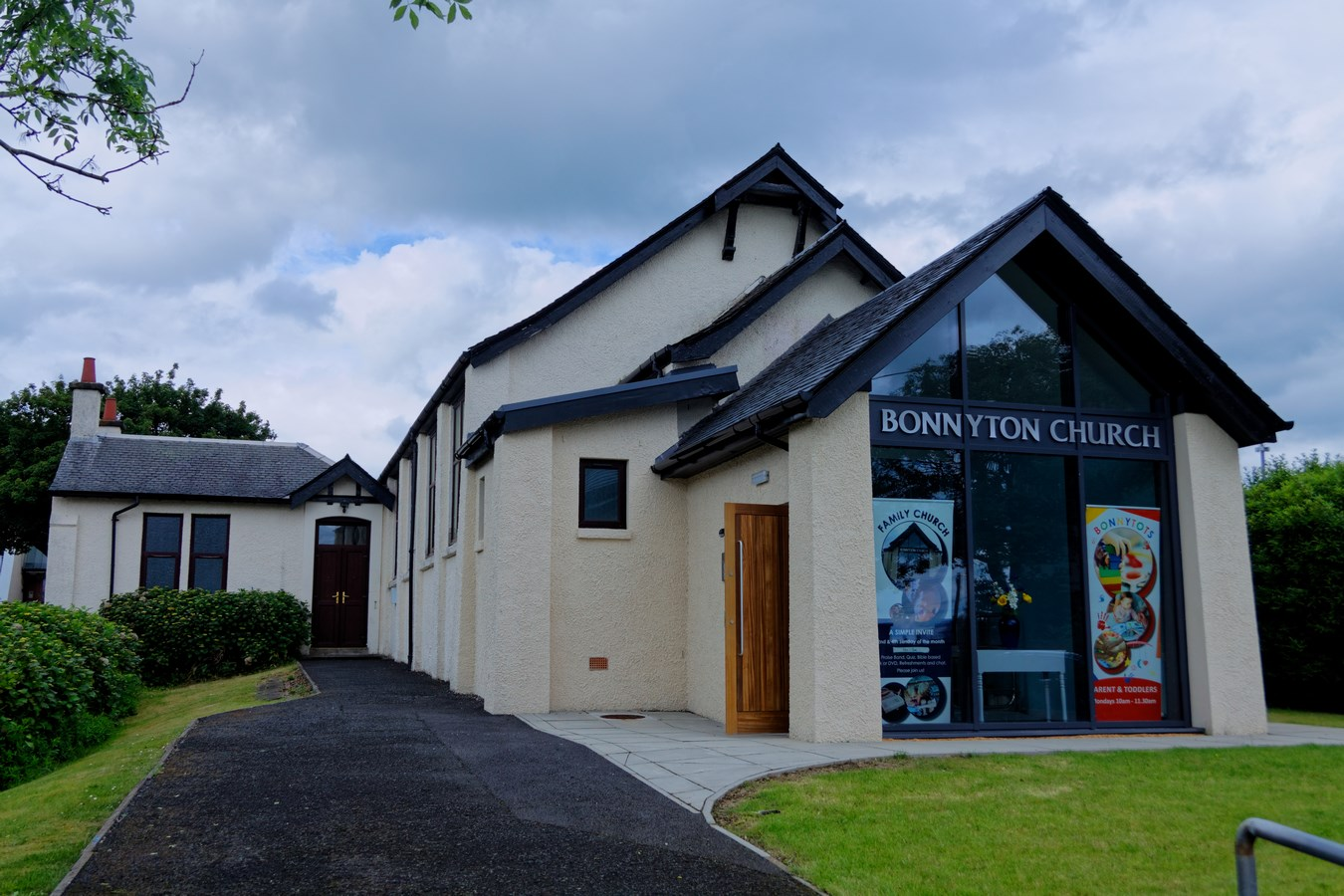
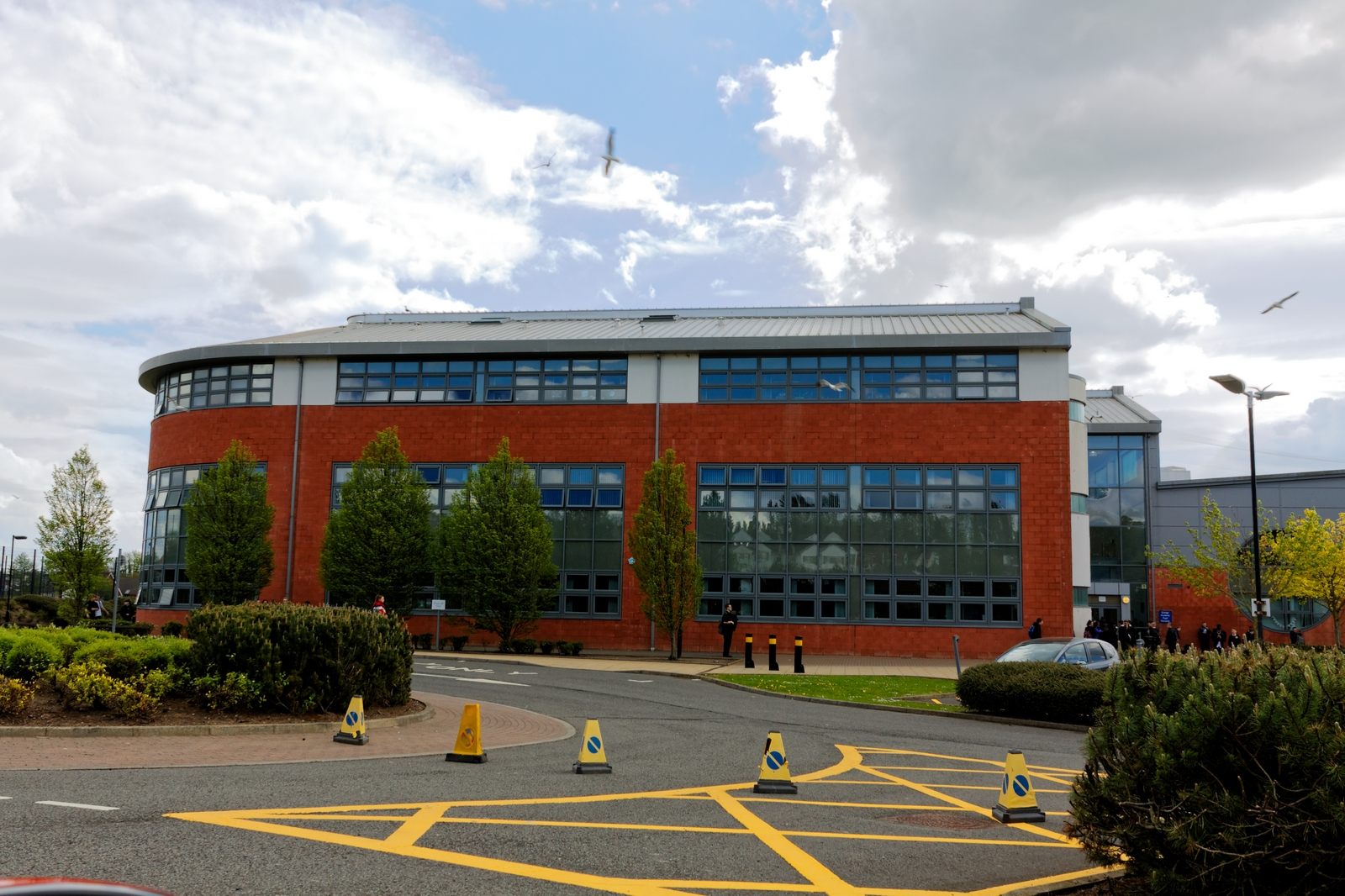
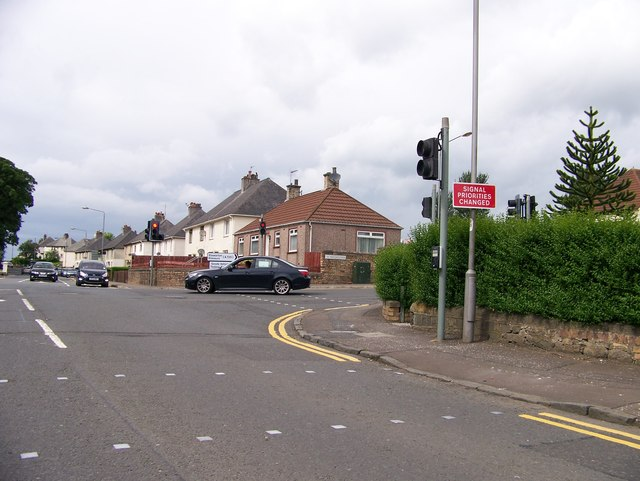
- Munro Avenue Welcome to Bonnyton Bonnyton Church Grange Academy Irvine Road

- Location within East Ayrshire Council area Location within Scotland
- Population: 3,741
- OS grid reference: NS4138
- Council area: East Ayrshire Council
- Shire county: East Ayrshire
- Country: Scotland
- Sovereign state: United Kingdom
- Post town: Kilmarnock
- Postcode district: KA1
- Dialling code: 01563
- Police: Scotland
- Fire: Scottish
- Ambulance: Scottish
- UK Parliament: Kilmarnock and Loudoun
- Scottish Parliament: Kilmarnock and Irvine Valley

Bonnyton (Scots: Bonnietoun, Scottish Gaelic: Bonnyton) is a neighbourhood in western Kilmarnock and former village in East Ayrshire, Scotland. It is home to a mix of residential and commercial properties, centred around estates such as Bonnyton Road, Munro Avenue and Gibson Street. Previously a village in its own right, Bonnyton was subsumed by Kilmarnock during the towns period of rapid growth and expansion in 1871.

In 2020, Bonnyton had a population of 3,741 inhabitants. For the purposes of population gathering, Bonnyton is named as Bonnyton and Town Centre. The area is home to the Bonnyton Industrial Estate, the HQ of both The KLIN Group and Brownings the Bakers, as well as nearby Kilmarnock railway station. The area is also home to Bonnyton Thistle F.C. who became members of the South of Scotland Football League.

== History ==
=== Origins ===
The name Bonnyton derives from the name of the land that the area was built upon which was originally farm land. It is believed to date back to 1316 where it is mentioned in a royal charter when Robert the Bruce, King of Scots, granted Sir Robert Boyd extensive lands at the Dean, including land at Bondington (now Bonnyton) and Hertschaw (now Hereshaw), for the support in the First War of Scottish Independence. In 1665 the Scottish Parliament passed an act to encourage cloth production in Scotland and soon afterwards three wool mills were set up at Ayr, Newmilns and Bonnyton.

=== Subsumed by Kilmarnock ===
The growth of Kilmarnock in population and geographical area swallowed up Bonnyton along with the old separate village communities of Beansburn and Riccarton. As a result, communities and villages around Kilmarnock lost their stature as villages due to the process of rehousing people who were dispersed to the new housing schemes. The new housing areas lacked adequate shopping and recreational facilities, and most of them were not within convenient walking distance of the old town centre. Despite the growth in population of Kilmarnock, the town did not grow in terms of proportion, and construction of new building took place mostly on "gap sites", the construction of houses at Robertson Place by the Kilmarnock Building Company, being an exception. Bonnyton became a part of Kilmarnock in 1871.

This expansion led to Kilmarnock becoming a major centre in the west of Scotland. By 1856, Kilmarnock was widely regarded as a key railway location when the Glasgow and South Western Railway re-located their workshops from Cook Street in Glasgow to Bonnyton. Homes were constructed for the workers of the Glasgow & South Western Railway Company at Bonnyton Square and at other areas in Bonnyton. These houses were later demolished in 1966 and 1967.

=== Recent history ===
The first Morrisons supermarket in Scotland opened in the Bonnyton area of Kilmarnock in West Langlands Street in 2004.

Barclay House is a conversion of the former Caledonia Works, which is a category B listed building of the former Andrew Barclay & Son railway engineers. It is now home to 62 apartments in a contemporary style and the development is considered central to Kilmarnock Town Centre and the bus and railway stations.

The then first minister of Scotland Alex Salmond visited Bonnyton to officially open the Andrew Barclay Railway Heritage Centre which opened in January 2008. The Andrew Barclay Heritage Centre, located on Bonnyton Road, is home to Drake 2086, a locomotive originally built by Andrew Barclay Sons & Co. in 1940.

== Economy ==
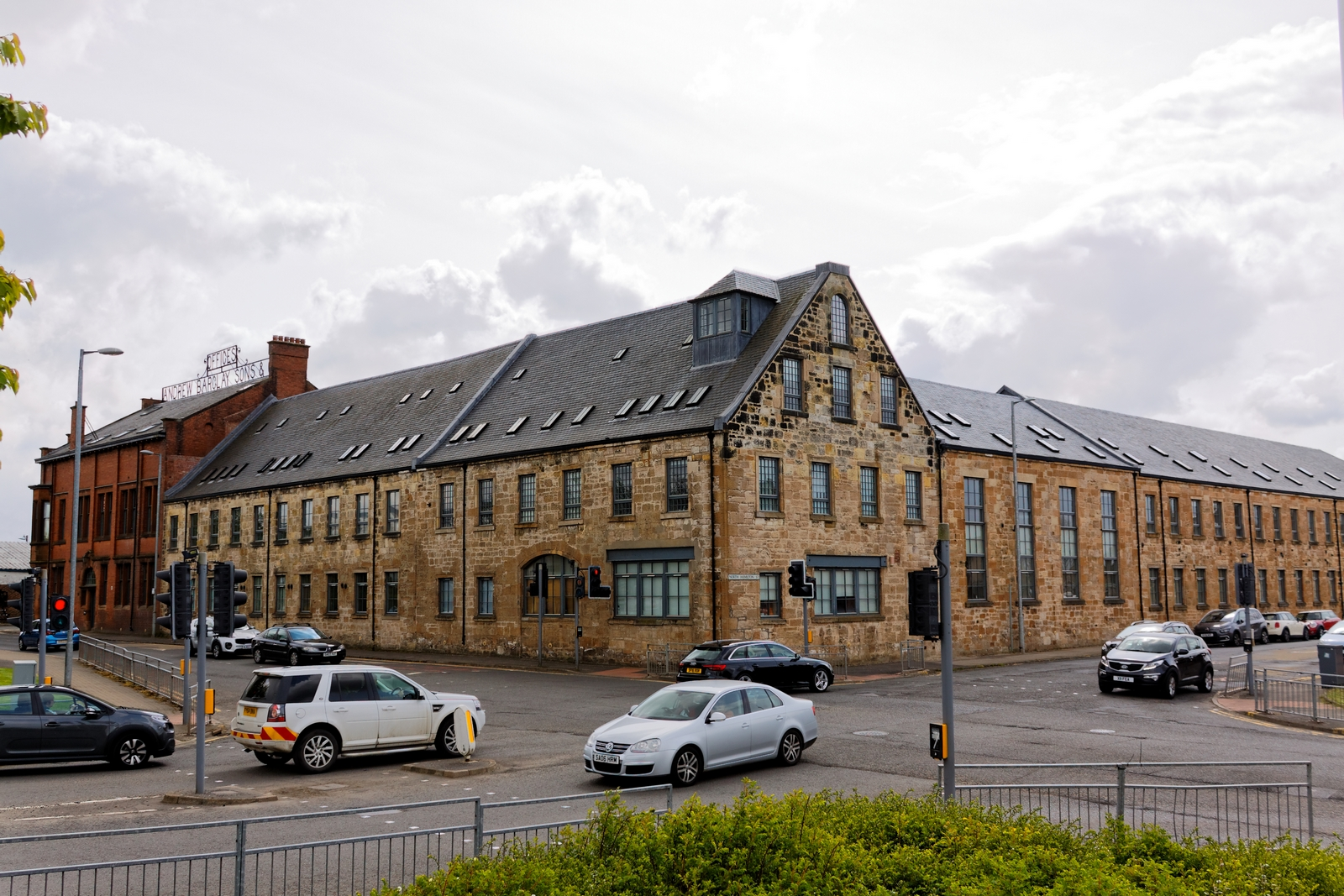
Former Andrew Barclay Sons & Co. offices in Bonnyton, now the HQ of property development firm The KLIN Group

=== Economic history ===
Like much of the town of Kilmarnock, Bonnyton was home to a number of industrial and factory plants. Carpet yarn firm Blackwood Brothers Ltd. was located between Munro Avenue and Western Road. In October 1999, it was announced that Blackwood Brothers Ltd. was being put up for sale, claiming that it is a "loss making business that is continuing to make loses". At the time, the factory in Bonnyton employed 330 people. The factory closed later in 1999. Fashion brand and retailer Jaeger formerly occupied a large unit in the Bonnyton Industrial Estate which closed in 2002. At the time of the closure, 300 people were employed at the factory.

=== Fireclay works ===
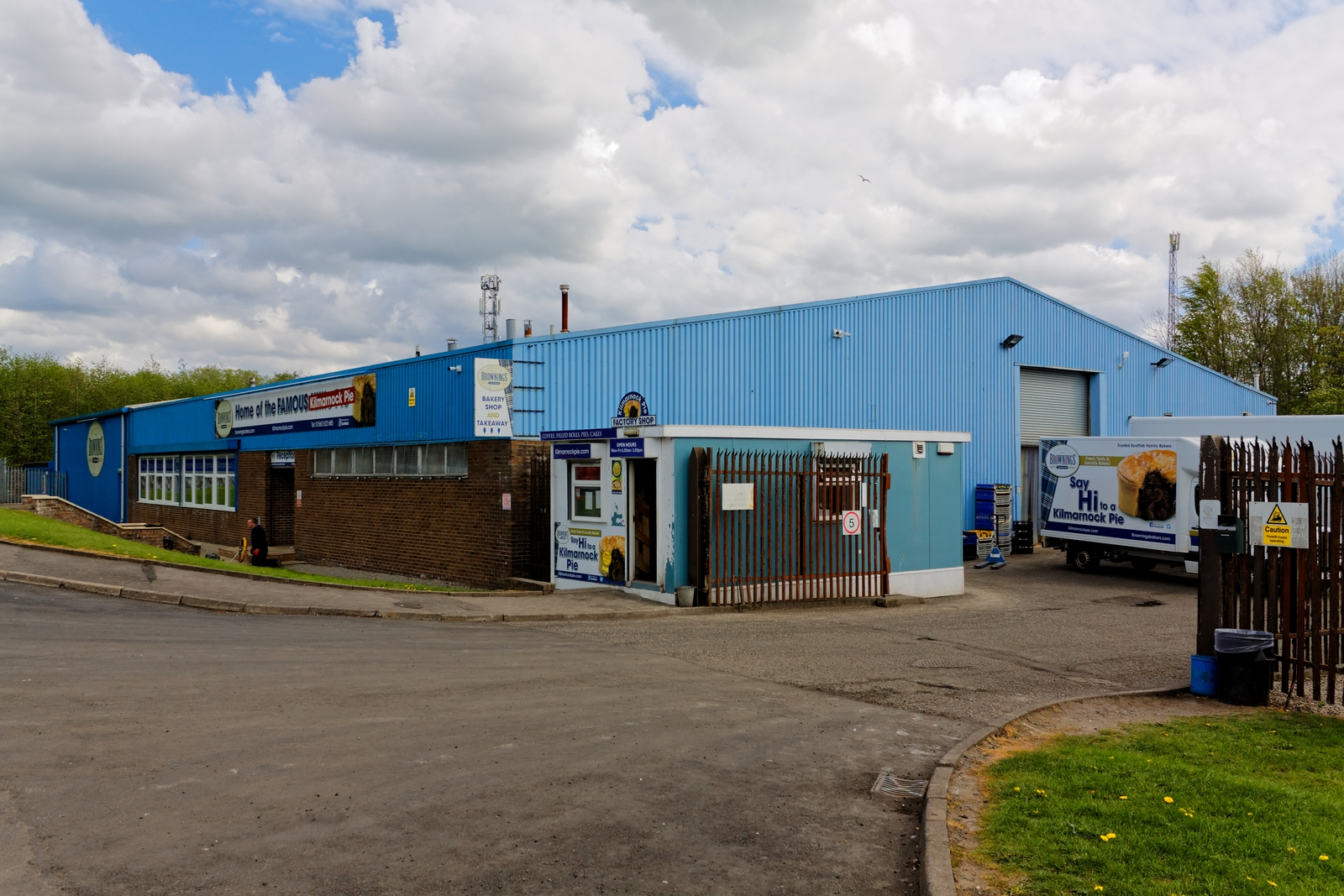
Brownings The Bakers factory located in the Bonnyton Industrial Estate located in Munro Place

The Bonnyton Fireclay Works were established on the west side of the area, south of the Dalry–Kilmarnock railway line. Bonnyton Fireclay Works is thought to have been established around 1876 by John Gilmour & Co. on the site of the Southhook Colliery No. 1 pit. Following bankruptcy in 1883, the company was bought by Anderson, Gilmour & Co., before Gilmour, Morton & Co. took over the business in 1899. In October 1899, the site suffered a serious fire within three drying sheds due to overheating stoves. Liquidation of the company occurred in 1908, at which time the company was in possession of 400,000 enamelled bricks within their stock.

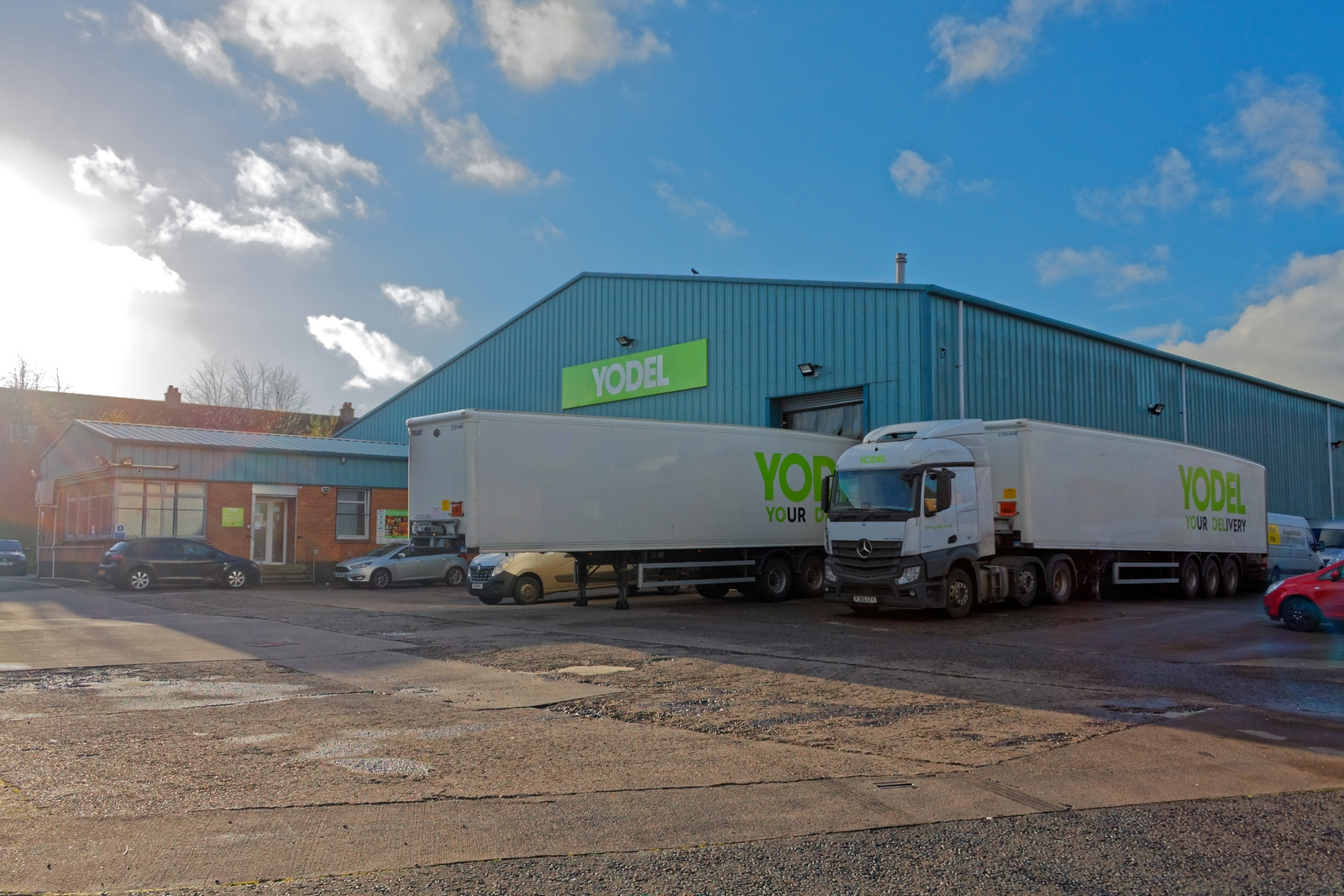
Yodel depot in Bonnyton

Following liquidation, the company was taken over by Southook and Shawsrigg Fire Clay Co. Ltd, and the first rotary gas fired kiln to be installed in Ayrshire was installed at the Bonnyton Works factory in 1925. The company specialised in the production of white glazed sanitary ware, including the popular Espevit closet set, consisting of a toilet pan and water tank. In addition to this, wall mountable sinks and basins were also manufactured at the site, in addition to larger urinals that were commonly installed within men's toilets. One of the last remaining buildings in Kilmarnock to contain Southhook manufactured white glazed bricks is located in the areas North Hamilton Street, incorporated into a terrace of houses that were erected in 1883 and designed by Robert Ingram. Southhook also produced firebricks, sewage pipes, drain pipes and other unglazed goods, and at one time employed around 500 employees. By the early 1970s, the company became known as Howie–Southhook Ltd, before closing shortly after and the site being cleared by 1973. As of 2023, the site of the former Fireclay Works and Southhook factories are occupied by residential housing at Margaret Parker Avenue as well as occupied by the Southhook Industrial Estate.

=== Modern industry ===
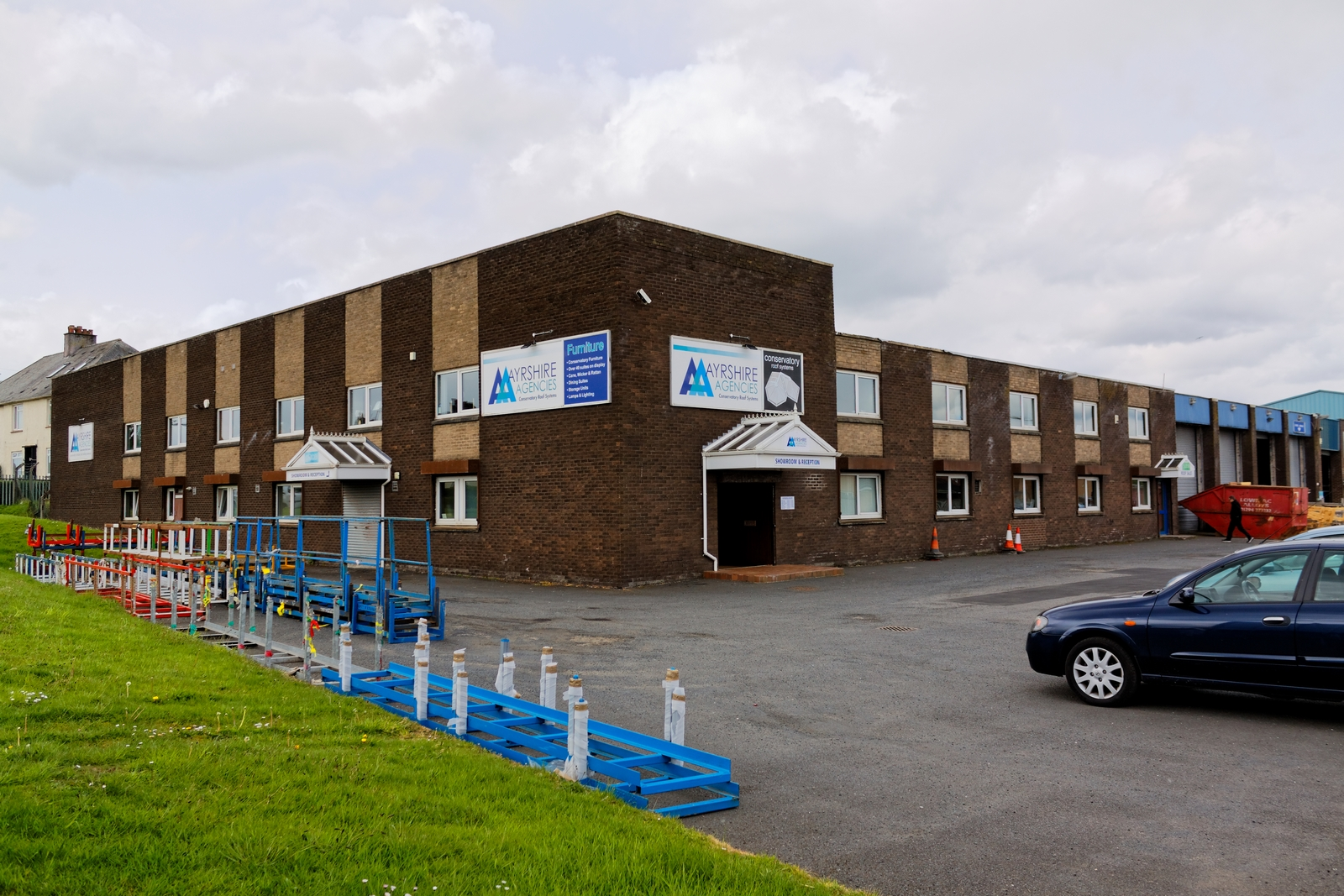
Ayrshire Agencies on Munro Avenue

In 2020, the Scottish Government reported that Bonnyton had 475 business sites currently active and operational, contributing business and operational income towards the Economy of Scotland. Property development and regeneration company The KLIN Group have their main HQ in Bonnyton, housed at Barclay House on West Langlands Street. The area is home to the Bonnyton Industrial Estate situated in Munro Place, just off Munro Avenue. The estate serves as the production base for companies including Brownings the Bakers, All Things Office and The Electrical Network.

Delivery firm Yodel had, until 2021, its main delivery depot in Bonnyton at the Southhook Industrial Estate, just off Munro Avenue. The company left the site in 2021 and moved to the Bonnyton Industrial Estate at nearby Munro Place.

== Geography ==
Previously a village in its own right, Bonnyton was subsumed into Kilmarnock following extensive growth of the Kilmarnock area in 1871. It is situated in the west of Kilmarnock, with the town centre coming under the Bonnyton catchment for the purposes of population census gathering. It is situated closely to the nearby village of Crosshouse which lies just outside Kilmarnock.

Bonnyton is a large geographic area, with an area hectare of 130ha. The majority of its population mostly lives out-with the centre of Bonnyton in areas such as Munro Avenue, Bonnyton Road, Lennox Crescent, Stirling Avenue and Yorke Place. As the majority of Bonnyton now lies within the town centre of Kilmarnock, most housing construction for residential purposes had to be constructed from the centre of the area away from industrial estates, factories and other areas of economic production of which Bonnyton (and Kilmarnock) were common for during the areas period of rapid growth.

To combat concerns over housing shortages in the area, East Ayrshire Council began building new houses within the centre of Bonnyton at Langlands Court, practice that had until 2015 been avoided due to the proximity to economic output areas. The housing project was completed by March 2015, marking the first housing development within the "centre area" of Bonnyton and not out-with the centre.

== Demographics ==
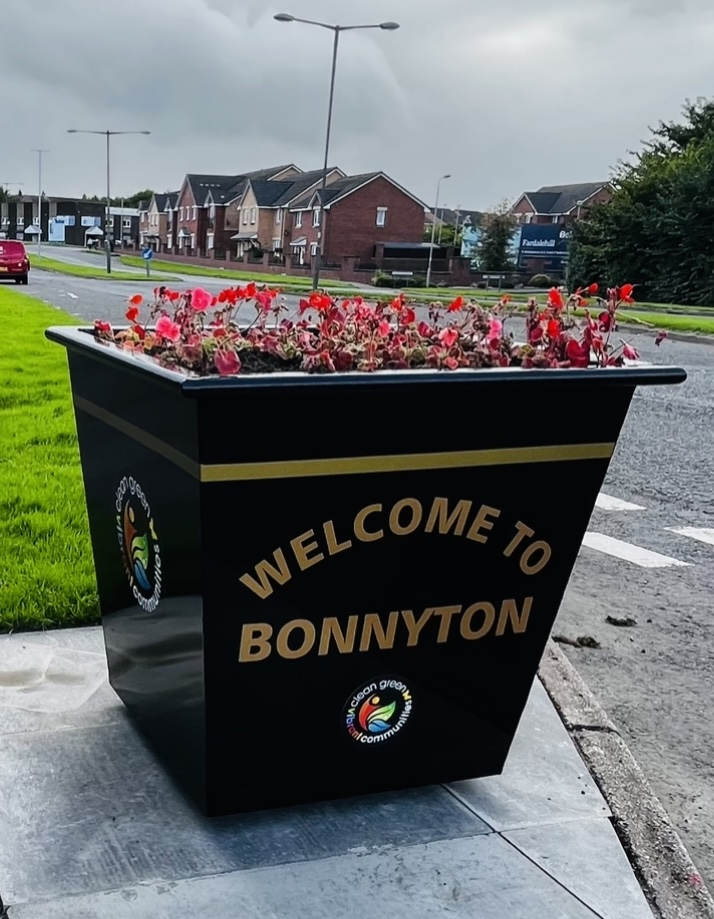
Welcome to Bonnyton floral display

In the 2001 Scottish population census, Bonnyton had an estimated population of 3,722 inhabitants. In 2017, Scottish Government data indicated that within Bonnyton there were 2,325 dwellings, with an average cost in 1997 of £37,784 (£87,000 in 2023) and a median cost of £32,000. By 2018, house prices in Bonnyton had reached an average of £75,000, a decrease from an average of £81,000 in 2014. House prices reached a peak in 2017 when the average cost was estimated at £88,600.

With a 94% attendance rate average across primary schools and the only secondary school, Grange Academy, educational attainment and performance in Bonnyton tends to be high. In 2012/2013, the ratio of secondary school pupils who had achieved 5 SCQF awards by S4 was an average of 39.1% of pupils, above the local authority average within East Ayrshire of 35% of pupils. In the same calculation period, 100% of secondary school pupils at S4 had attained gained awards in English and Maths at SCQF Level 3 or above, against a local authority average of 92.4%.

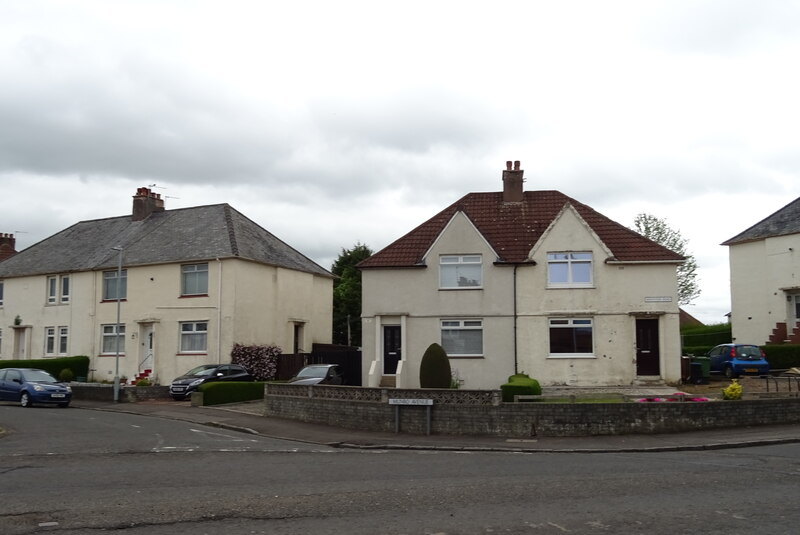
Typical housing in Bonnyton, consisting of four in a block flats and semi-detached houses

In 2008/2009, the Scottish Government indicated that the estimated average median weekly income for households in Bonnyton was £371 per week which was slightly lower than the East Ayrshire average of £431 per week and the national average in Scotland of £468 per week in the same period.

By 2017, Bonnyton's housing consisted of various types of housing, a mixture of social housing provided by the local authority, privately owned housing development and ex-local authority housing bought by tenants under the Right to Buy scheme. The Right to Buy scheme in Scotland ended in July 2016, meaning tenants of council properties were no longer permitted to by their home from the local authority. Data collated in 2017 by the Scottish Government found that within Bonnyton 4.5% were detached houses, 70% flats, 17% semi-detached houses and 9.1% terraced houses. In 2022, East Ayrshire Council granted permission for new social housing in Bonnyton, the councils first net zero housing development in the Bellevue Gardens area.

== Education ==
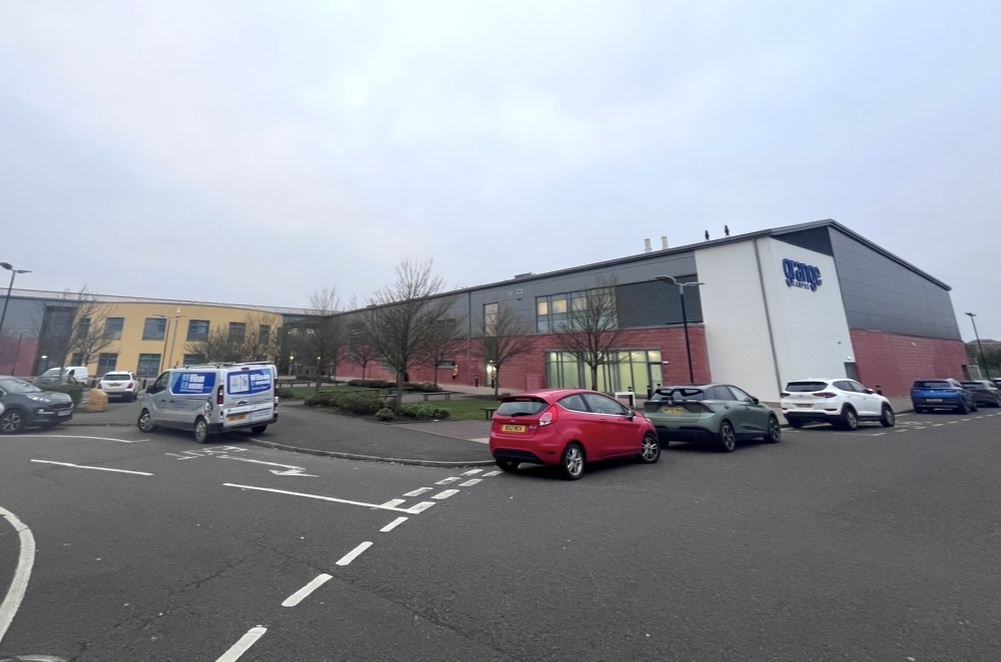
Grange Academy is located within Bonnyton, and the areas only secondary school

In February 2009, a new Grange Campus, housing Grange Academy, Annanhill Primary School and Park School, opened following the closure of the former Grange Academy, Annanhill Primary and Park School buildings. The campus was officially opened by leader of East Ayrshire Council Councillor Douglas Reid and a prayer of dedication by the Very Rev Dr David Lacy. As well as providing primary, secondary and special education, the campus also provides learning and teaching opportunities within Scottish Gaelic and houses hearing impairment and visual impairment units. The site also houses the Grange leisure centre which is opened for use by the public and features amenities including a main hall with eight badminton courts, two gym halls, the assembly hall of Grange Academy as well as dance studio facilities. The construction and opening of the new campus was hailed as "Kilmarnock's showpiece" when opened in 2009.

Grange Academy plays host to a Scottish Rugby Union 'School of Rugby'. In 2012, the school was selected as the Ayrshire base for the Scottish Football Association's Performance Schools, a system devised to support the development of the best young talented footballers across the country (there are seven such schools across Scotland).

Grange Academy is a Scottish Football Association performance school, one of only seven across Scotland, with the aim to support the development of Scotland's best young footballing talent. The Performance Schools programme is designed to give talented boys and girls, with the best potential to develop their abilities, the opportunity to practise football everyday within an educational environment.

== Governance ==
Bonnyton is represented on East Ayrshire Council as Kilmarnock West and Crosshouse (shaded in red, shown within East Ayrshire)

Bonnyton Community Council represents the population within Bonnyton in areas of local importance and concern to residents, as well as raising funds for community projects and initiatives such as gala days, community events and special occasions. The community council is also involved in the planning and verdict of planning applications relating to the Bonnyton area.

Bonnyton is represented on East Ayrshire Council as Ward 3 (Kilmarnock West and Crosshouse). The current political structure consists of four local councillors; Lillian Jones (Scottish Labour Party), Tom Cook (Scottish Conservative and Unionist Party), Ian Linton (Scottish National Party) and Douglas Reid (Scottish National Party, also leader of East Ayrshire Council). In the Scottish Parliament, Bonnyton is represented as part of the Kilmarnock and Irvine Valley constituency. The current MSP for the area is Willie Coffey. In the UK Parliament, Bonnyton is represented as part of the Kilmarnock and Loudoun constituency. The current MP is Alan Brown.

=== 2022 election ===
The SNP (2), Labour (1) and the Conservatives (1) retained the seats they had won at the previous election.

Kilmarnock West and Crosshouse - 4 seats
Party	Candidate	FPv%	Count			
Party	Candidate	FPv%	1	2	3	4
Labour	Lillian Jones (incumbent)	28.2	1,662			
Conservative	James Adams	22.0	1,297			
SNP	Iain Linton (incumbent)	19.8	1,168	1,219		
SNP	Douglas Reid (incumbent)	18.6	1,093	1,142	1,149	1,182
Independent	Frank McNiff	6.3	369	475	516	517
Green	Elizabeth Brown	3.9	228	299	308	312
Alba	Guy Njali Bola	1.2	71	81	82	83
Electorate: 13,347 Valid: 5,888 Spoilt: 70 Quota: 1,178 Turnout: 44.6%

Bonnyton, as part of the Kilmarnock West and Crosshouse ward, voted in the most recent election to East Ayrshire Council.

=== 2024 by–election ===
A by–election was held in November 2024 to replace Lillian Jones who had been elected as the MP for Kilmarnock and Loudoun at the general election in July.

Kilmarnock West and Crosshouse by-election (14 November 2024) – 1 seat
Party	Candidate	FPv%	Count				
Party	Candidate	FPv%	1	2	3	4	5
Labour	Jayne Sangster	39.4	1,213	1,225	1,276	1,468	1,935
SNP	Marie Robertson	33.3	1,025	1,032	1,060	1,127	
Conservative	Allan MacDonald	20.2	623	635	675		
Liberal Democrats	Lee Manley	4.7	145	162			
Independent	Stephen McNamara	2.4	75				
Electorate: 13,260 Valid: 3,081 Spoilt: 28 Quota: 1,541 Turnout: 23.4%

Since the creation of the Kilmarnock West and Crosshouse ward in 2007 in East Ayrshire Council, Bonnyton has been represented by the following councillors.

Election	Councillors			
2007	Ian Linton (SNP)	Douglas Reid (SNP)	Robert Keohone (Labour)	Tom Cook (Conservative)
2012	Ian Linton (SNP)	Douglas Reid (SNP)	Lillian Jones (Labour)	Tom Cook (Conservative)
2017	Ian Linton (SNP)	Douglas Reid (SNP)	Lillian Jones (Labour)	Tom Cook (Conservative)
2022	Ian Linton (SNP)	Douglas Reid (SNP)	Lillian Jones (Labour)	James Adams (Conservative)

== Transport ==
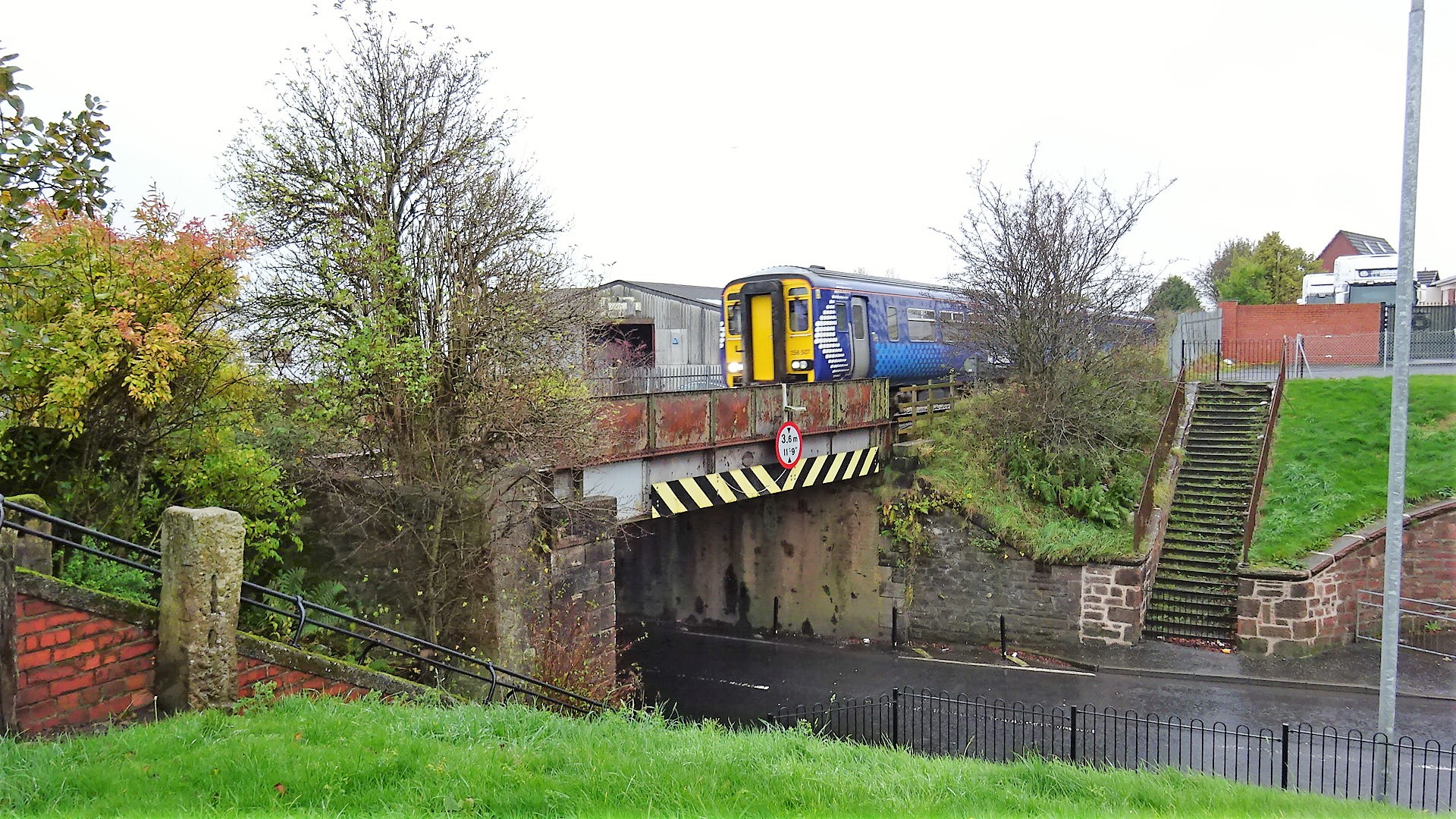
A train bound for Kilmarnock passes through Bonnyton at Bonnyton Road

Given its centralised location in Kilmarnock, Bonnyton has ample transportation services including regular bus services from Kilmarnock bus station to locations such as University Hospital Crosshouse, Irvine and Ardrossan. The area is connected to Troon by a Stagecoach bus service operating between Kilmarnock bus station and Troon, with the bus passing through Bonnyton. The Stagecoach Number 11 bus service passes through Bonnyton at the Irvine road before finally terminating at Ardrossan in North Ayrshire.

The Kilmarnock railway station is located within Bonnyton, with train services from Kilmarnock to Glasgow Central railway station. Bonnyton, and the wider Kilmarnock area, has no international airport. The area is however served by nearby Glasgow Prestwick Airport (14 mi). Ryanair provide a number of flights from Glasgow Prestwick to various destinations across Europe.

== Sports ==
Bonnyton Thistle F.C. became members of the South of Scotland Football League in 2017. Founded in 1912, they were previously a youth and amateur team.

Despite their name referencing Bonnyton, their new home ground is The Synergy Arena, located in the Townholm area of Kilmarnock, which has a capacity of 1,000. It was opened in 2017 to coincide with the club's move into senior football.

The club's previous home ground, located in the Warwickhill Road area of Bonnyton, was vacated by the club in 2017 following their move to Townholm. Their new lease of the Synergy Area in Townholm is for a period of 25 years, lasting until 16 February 2042. During this period, East Ayrshire Council advertised the stadium at Warwickhill Road up for lease.

== See also ==
- Kilmarnock; the town in which Bonnyton is located, having been subsumed by the town's growth in 1871
- East Ayrshire Council; the local authority Bonnyton is governed by
- East Ayrshire; the geographical area of Scotland Bonnyton is located within
