= Charles B. Brooks =

US inventor, including street sweeping truck

- Born: 1865; Virginia, U.S.
- Died: 1908 (aged 42–43)
- Occupation: Inventor

Charles B. Brooks (1865–1908) was a Black American inventor. Born in Virginia in 1865, by the 1890s he was a resident of Newark, New Jersey. Besides inventing, Brooks was a porter for the Pullman Palace Car Company. Unlike other sweepers at that time (1890s), Brooks’ sweeper was the first self-propelled street sweeping truck. His design had revolving brushes attached to the front fender, and the brushes were interchangeable so that when snow fell, scrapers could be attached for snow removal. He received a patent for his invention on March 17, 1896 (US Patent #556,711). A few months later, on May 12, 1896, he patented a dust-proof collection bag for the street sweeper (US Patent #560,154).

Although little information is available about his life, we do know that funding for the production for his sweeper was provided by George M. Hallstead and Plummer S. Page. The production took place in Scranton, Pennsylvania, where each sweeper was priced at around $2,000. It proved to be so successful that the Pennsylvania state government gave a $100,000 contract to the manufacturing company. The maintenance superintendent of Buffalo, New York, was so impressed with Brook's design that he adopted the model for his city.

Brooks also received a third patent for what he called a "ticket punch" on October 31, 1893 (US Patent #507,672), an early example of a paper punch, unique for its time because unlike hole punchers of today, his had a built-in receptacle to catch the round pieces of waste paper there and prevents littering.
