= Clement Writer =

English anti-scripturist and clothier

Clement Writer (fl. 1627–1658), was an English "anti-scripturist" and clothier from Worcester, best known for his attacks on the infallibility of the Bible.

== Life ==
In 1627 "Clement Write, tailor",’ attached Captain Edward Spring's horses for a debt of £8. In 1631 he had a lawsuit with John Racster, who wrote on 19 November to Sir Dudley Carleton, viscount Dorchester, requesting him to use his influence in his behalf with Sir Nathaniel Brent, judge of the prerogative court. He had another lawsuit at a later date against his uncle, George Worfield, in the court of chancery, in which he complained that the lord keeper, Thomas Coventry, 1st Baron Coventry, did him injustice to the extent of some £1,500 on the representations of some Puritan antagonist. On 4 December 1640 he petitioned for redress to "the grand committee of the courts of justice", but before his case could be heard the committee was dissolved.

In February 1645–6 Writer renewed his complaint to the committee of the House of Commons appointed to consider petitions. They on 10 February nominated a sub-committee to examine his case, but before their report was made the committee of petitions was suspended. After this new disappointment he printed and distributed to members of parliament The Sad Case of Clement Writer, who hath waited for reliefe therein since the fourth December 1640. In 1652 the Worcester committee for sequestration were enjoined by Thomas Fowle, solicitor for the Commonwealth, to examine into his case against Lord Coventry, but the dissolution of parliament in December again prevented his obtaining hearing. On 1 October 1656 he petitioned Cromwell on the subject, and the council of state referred his case to a committee. Whether he ultimately obtained satisfaction is uncertain.

While Writer's temporal affairs were far from prosperous, his spiritual condition, according to Thomas Edwards (1599–1647), was continually becoming more dreadful. Originally a Presbyterian, or at least a Puritan, about 1638 he "fell off from the communion of our churches to independency and Brownisme; from that he fell to anabaptisme and Arminianisme and to mortalisme, holding the soul mortal. After that he fell to be a seeker, and is now an anti-scripturist, questionist, and sceptick, and, I fear, an atheist". By 1647, Edwards proceeds to say, he had become "an arch-heretique and fearfull apostate, an old wolf, and a subtile man, who goes about corrupting and venting his errors; he is often in Westminster-Hall and in the Exchange", making it "his businesse to plunder men of their faith; and if he can do that upon any it fattens him—that's meat to him".

== Works ==
Edwards asserted that Writer had a large share in Man's Mortalitie, an anonymous tract usually attributed to Richard Overton, in which heterodox doctrines were propounded concerning the immortality of the soul.

Shortly before 1655 Writer formed the acquaintance of Richard Baxter, who described him as "an ancient man, who professed to be a seeker, but was either a juggling papist or an infidel, more probably the latter." He wrote "a scornful book against the ministry", called Jus Divinum Presbyterii, a treatise which is not extant. Baxter added that in conversation with him Writer urged that "no man is bound to believe in Christ who doth not see confirming miracles with his own eyes", anticipating David Hume's argument. Baxter replied to Writer in the Unreasonableness of Infidelity (London, 1655).

In 1657 appeared Fides Divina: the Ground of True Faith asserted (London), which is probably by Writer, although he refused to acknowledge to Baxter that he was the author. In this treatise he urged the insufficiency of the scriptures as a rule of faith on account of their liability to error in transcription and translation, and on account of the differences of opinion respecting the inspiration of certain of them. Baxter resumed the controversy in A Second Sheet for the Ministry, and in 1658 Writer rejoined with An Apologetical Narration: or a just and necessary Vindication of Clement Writer against a Four-fold Charge laid on him by Richard Baxter (London). The date of Writer's death is not known.
