= Charlie Brooks (footballer) =

English footballer

Personal information
- Full name: Charles Edward Brooks
- Date of birth: 12 January 1911
- Place of birth: Brabourne, England
- Date of death: October 1980 (aged 69)
- Place of death: Folkestone, England
- Height: 5 ft 11 in (1.80 m)
- Position: Right back

Senior career*
| Years | Team | Apps | (Gls) |
| 1930–1931 | Arsenal | 0 | (0) |
| 1931–1932 | Nunhead | | |
| 1932–1936 | Folkestone | | |
| 1937–1938 | Clapton Orient | 4 | (0) |
| 1938–1940 | Crystal Palace | 0 | (0) |
| 1940–1943 | Clapton Orient | 0 | (0) |
- * Club domestic league appearances and goals

Charles Edward Brooks (12 January 1911 – October 1980) was an English professional footballer who played in the Football League for Clapton Orient as a right back.

== Career statistics ==
Appearances and goals by club, season and competition
| Club | Season | League | | | National cup | | Other | | Total | |
| Club | Season | Division | Apps | Goals | Apps | Goals | Apps | Goals | Apps | Goals |
|---|---|---|---|---|---|---|---|---|---|---|
| Clapton Orient | 1937–38 | Third Division South | 4 | 0 | 1 | 0 | 1 (Note: Appearance in Third Division South Cup) | 0 | 6 | 0 |
| Career total | | | 4 | 0 | 1 | 0 | 1 | 0 | 6 | 0 |
