= Killie pie =

Scottish steak and gravy pie

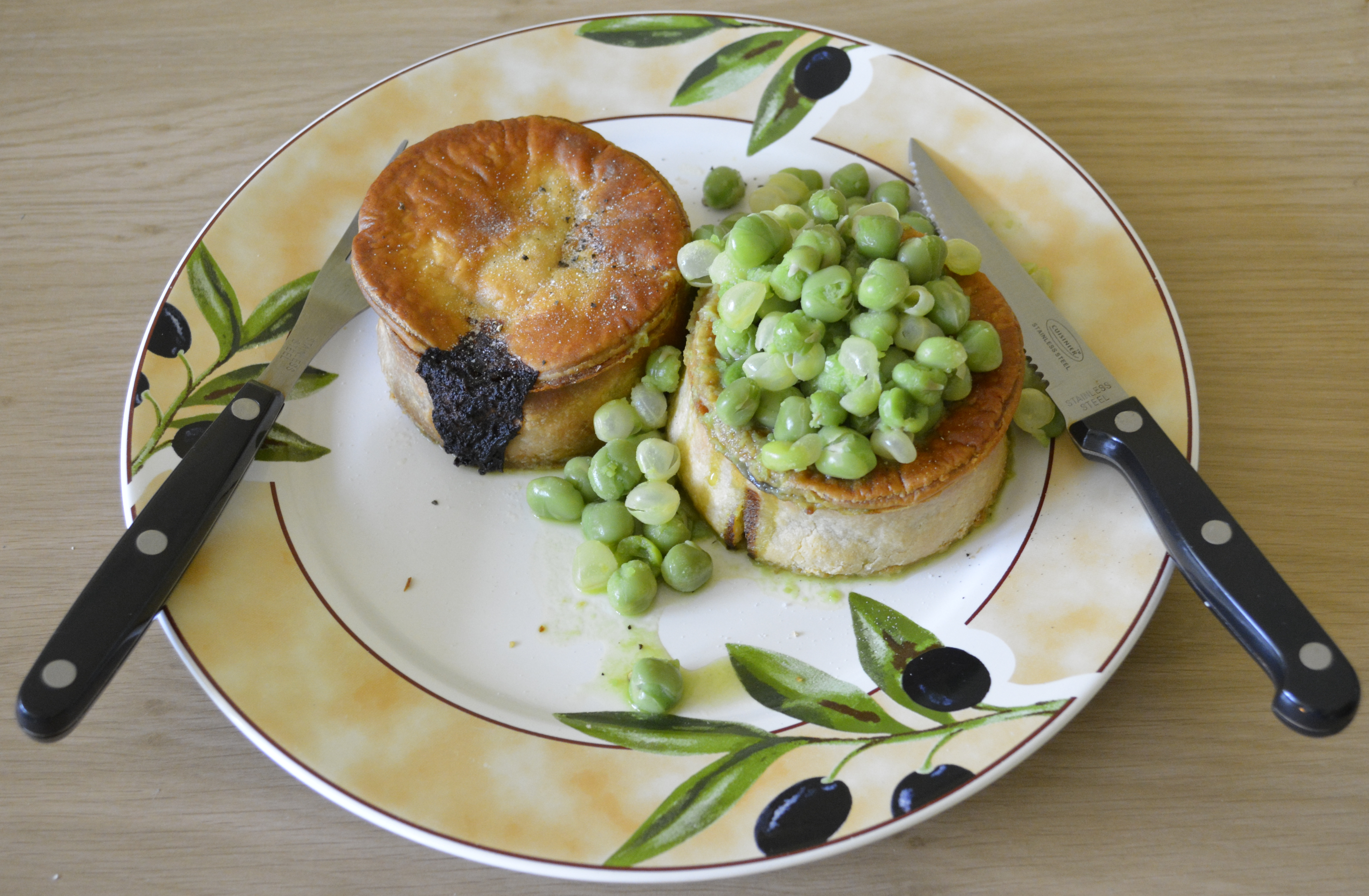
- Killie pies served with peas
- Alternative names: Kilmarnock pie
- Type: Savoury pie
- Place of origin: Scotland
- Region or state: Ayrshire
- Created by: Brownings the Bakers
- Serving temperature: Hot
- Main ingredients: Steak

A Killie pie (or Kilmarnock pie) is a steak and gravy pie, created initially for Kilmarnock Football Club and sold at their stadium, Rugby Park.

Local bakery Brownings has produced the pie for the club since 2003, and it is also sold in Aldi, SPAR and selected Scotmid stores in Scotland. Following a trademark dispute between the bakery and the football club, the bakery’s retail product was renamed to "Kilmarnock Pie" in 2017.

The pie is somewhat unusual for being a steak pie and not a Scotch pie, the type of pie normally associated with football in Scotland.

== History ==
It won the award for best pie in football two years running and is popular among away fans for its quality.

It is made by Brownings the Bakers of Kilmarnock, who sponsored Kilmarnock from 2020–2023.

== See also ==
- List of pies, tarts and flans
