= Humphrey Brooke (physician) =

Englilsh physician (1617–1693)

Humphrey Brooke (1617–1693) was an English physician and political radical.

== Life ==
Brooke was born in London in 1617. He was educated in Merchant Taylors' School, and entered St John's College, Oxford, of which he became a fellow. He proceeded M.B. 1646, M.D. 1659, was elected fellow of the London College of Physicians 1674, and was subsequently several times censor.

In the mid-1640s Brooke was living in the home of William Walwyn, whose daughter he married, in Moorfields, London. He met Clement Writer, and was involved in the margins of the Leveller movement. He was questioned on his activities in 1649 by Thomas Scot.

Brooke died very rich at his house in Leadenhall Street, 9 December 1693.

== Works ==
Brooke was the author of A Conservatory of Health, comprised in a Plain and Practical Discourse upon the Six Particulars necessary for Man's Life, London, 1650, and also a book of paternal advice, addressed to his children, under the title of The Durable Legacy, London, 1681, of which only fifty copies were printed. It contains 250 pages of practical, moral, and religious directions, couched in a simple Christian style.
