= Charles Brook, Newfoundland and Labrador =

Settlement in Newfoundland and Labrador, Canada

Coordinates: 49.334°N 55.249°W

Location of Charles Brook in Newfoundland and Labrador

Charles Brook is a settlement in Newfoundland and Labrador, Canada. Charles Brook is in the electoral district Coast of Bays-Central-Notre Dame. Clifford Small is the MP of this electoral district.
