= William Henry Brooke =

Irish-born British painter and illustrator

- Born: 1772
- Died: 12 January 1860 (aged 87–88)
- Occupations: portrait painter and illustrator
- Parent: Henry Brooke

William Henry Brooke (1772–12 January 1860) was a British portrait painter and illustrator.

== Life ==
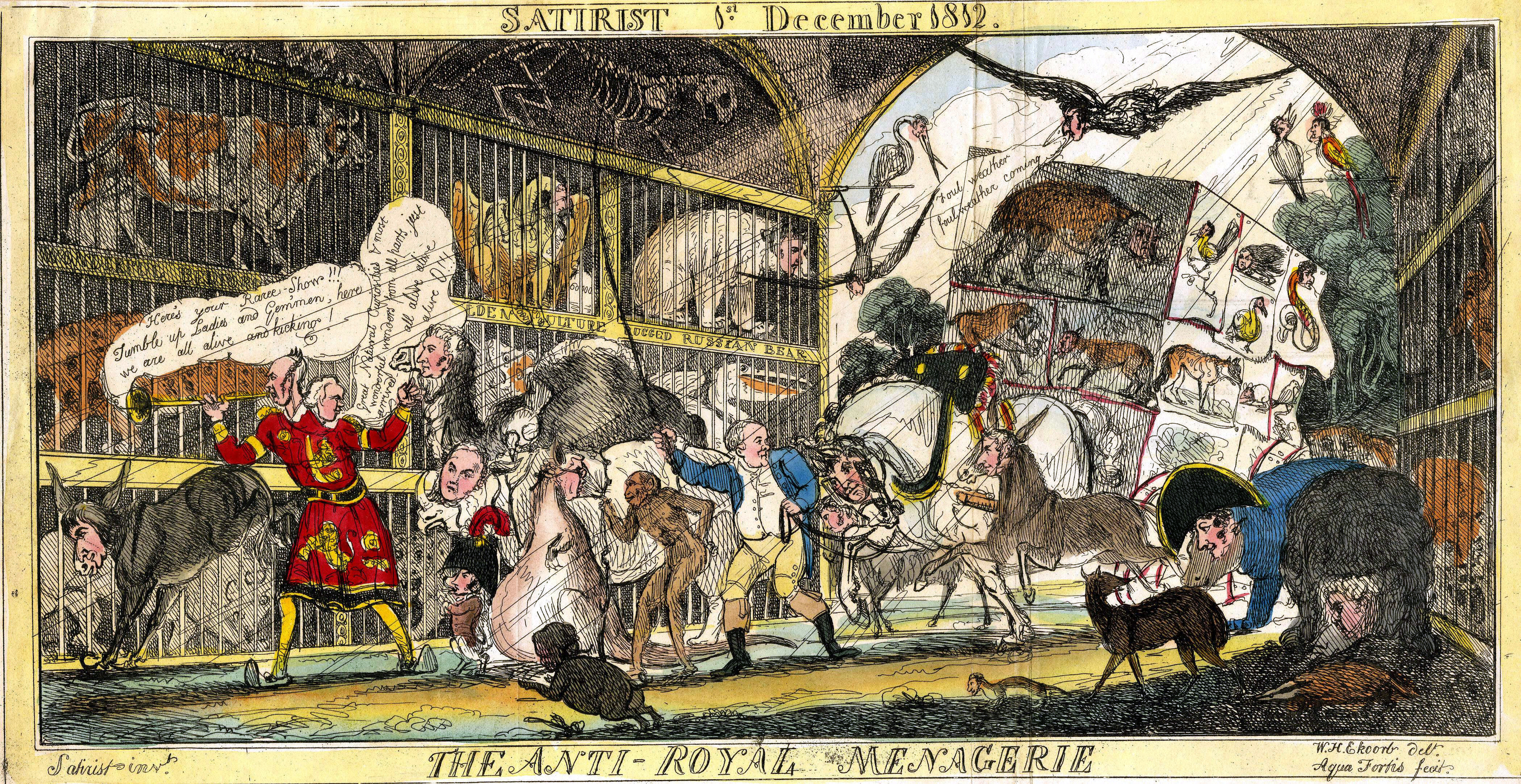
The anti-royal menagerie, from The Satirist, 1812. Print from the collection of the British Museum.

William Henry Brooke was born in 1772, possibly in London. He was the son of the painter Henry Brooke and his wife Anne Kirchoffer. He was grandson of Robert Brooke, and a grandnephew of Henry Brooke, the author of A Fool of Quality.

Initially, Brooke worked in a banker's office but left to become a painter. He was a pupil of Henry or Samuel Drummond, and worked as a portrait painter working from Duke Street, Adelphi. His portraits were popular, as they were reproduced as engravings frequently.

He exhibited portraits and figure subjects at the Royal Academy occasionally between 1810 and 1826, and with the British Institution between 1826 and 1835. He also exhibited with the Royal Hibernian Academy in 1827, 1828, 1829, 1842 and 1846, having been elected Associate in 1828.

From 1812 to 1813 he drew for the monthly London publication, The Satirist. Walter G. Strickland describes his drawings as "witless and vulgar" but they got him further work in book illustration, for which he is best known. As an illustrator, Brooke was influenced by Thomas Stothard, a friend. He contributed to Thomas Moore's Irish Melodies (1822), Izaak Walton's Compleat Angler in the edition by John Major, Thomas Keightley's Mythology (1831), and other works. He also illustrated Persian and Turkish Tales, Gulliver's Travels, Nathaniel Cotton's Vision in Verse, T. Crofton Croker's Annual, The Christmas Box, Legends of Killarney, and William Carleton's Traits and Stories of the Irish Peasantry (1834 and 1835). The majority of these illustrations were designed, etched or engraved by Brooke. Strickland notes that his illustrations "though not of great merit, are well drawn and possessed of a certain grace and character which is pleasing."

He died at Chichester on 12 January 1860 after a long illness. He is buried in the churchyard at Westhampnett, Sussex. Examples of his work are held in the National Portrait Gallery, London, Leeds City Art Gallery, British Museum and the Victoria and Albert Museum.

== Works ==
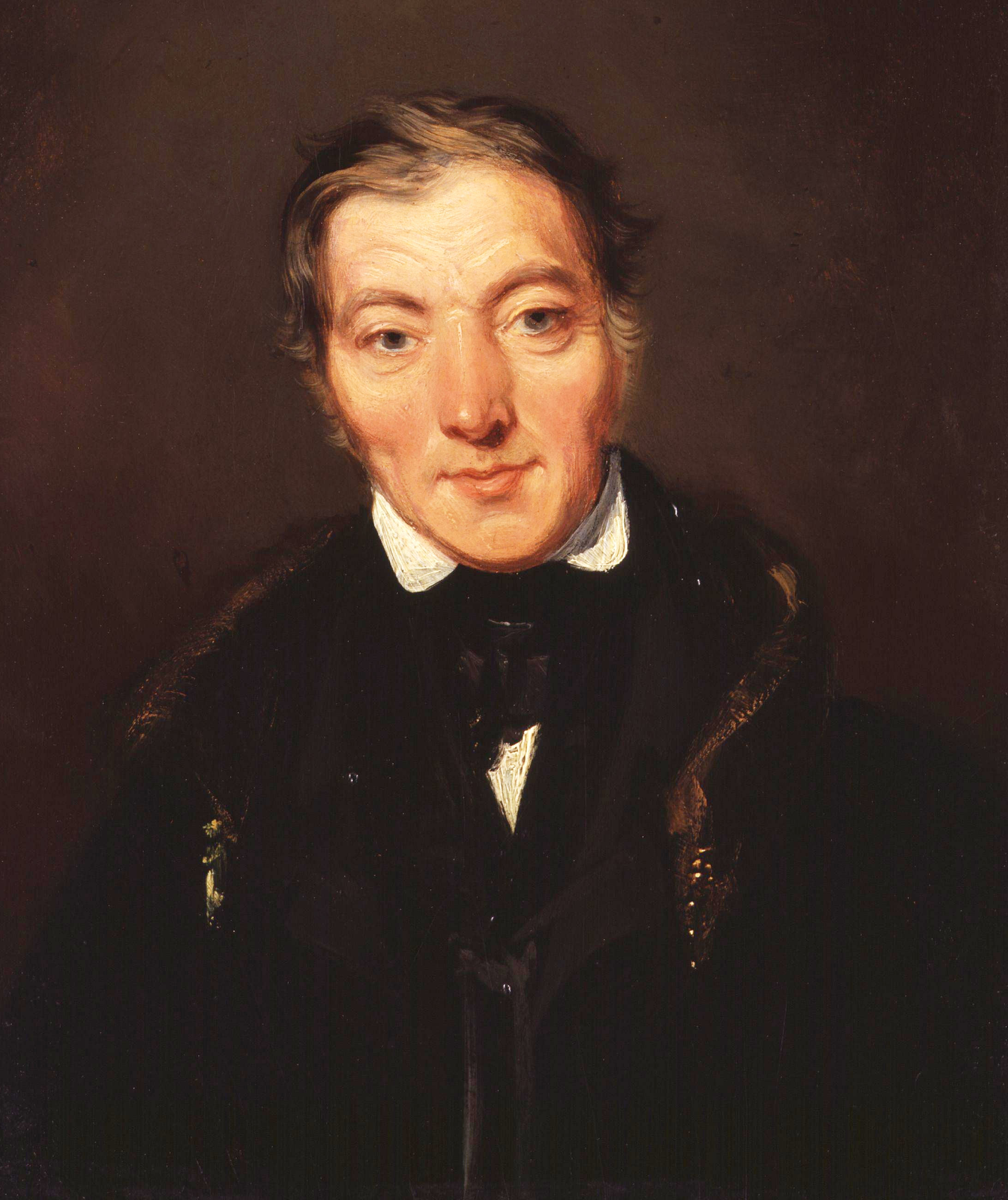
Portrait of Robert Owen, now in the National Portrait Gallery.

- Annette, a portrait (1812)
- Murder of Thomas a' Beckett, a sketch for a large picture (1811)
- Tourists in the South of Ireland ascending the Galtee Mountains (1823)
- Chastity (1826)
- The Battle of Waterloo, a sketch (1826)
- The Nubian Slave at the feet of Edith Plantagenet (1827)
- Study of a Waterman on Porchester Lake (1828)
- Portrait of Robert Owen (1834) now in the National Portrait Gallery
