= Robert Brooke =

Robert Brooke may refer to:

== Military ==
- Robert Greville, 2nd Baron Brooke (1607–1643), English Civil War Parliamentarian general
- Robert Brooke-Popham (1878–1953), British Royal Air Force officer, born Robert Brooke

== Politics ==
- Robert Brooke (MP for Dunwich) (1572–1646), English politician
- Robert Brooke (16th century MP) (1531–1599), MP for City of York
- Robert Brooke Sr. (1602–1655), British Governor of Maryland
- Robert Brooke (died 1669) (1637–1669), British Member of Parliament for Aldeburgh
- Robert Brooke (East India Company officer) (1744–1811), British Governor of St. Helena
- Robert Brooke (Virginia governor) (c. 1751–1800), Governor of Virginia, 1794–1796

== Other ==
- Bob Brooke (born 1960), American ice hockey player
- Robert Brooke (cricket writer) (1940–2025), English cricket writer

== See also ==
- Robert Brooks (disambiguation)
