= Charles Brook (cricketer) =

Argentine cricketer

Personal information
- Full name: Charles Walter Brook
- Born: 2 February 1901; Argentina
- Died: 16 July 1976 (aged 75); Argentina
- Batting: Unknown
- Role: Wicket-keeper

Career statistics
Competition	First-class
Matches	2
Runs scored	10
Batting average	2.50
100s/50s	–/–
Top score	7
Catches/stumpings	5/–
- Source: Cricinfo, 27 January 2022

Charles Walter Brook (2 February 1901 — 16 July 1976) was an Argentine first-class cricketer.

Brook was born in Argentina in February 1901. Brook played first-class cricket for Argentina as a wicket-keeper in January 1927, making two appearances against the touring Marylebone Cricket Club at Buenos Aires. He scored 10 runs in these two matches, with a highest score of 7. In his capacity as wicket-keeper, he took 5 catches. Brook died in Argentina in July 1976.
