= Eileen Brooke =

British statistician

Eileen M. Brooke
- Born: 1905
- Died: 1989 (aged 83–84)
- Scientific career
- Fields: Statistics, public health, mental health
- Institutions: General Register Office (England & Wales), World Health Organization

Eileen Minnie Brooke (1905 – 1989) was a British statistician and health policy professional.

== Education ==
Eileen Minnie Brooke attended East London College, earning a B.Sc. in mathematics in 1926, and an M.Sc. in mathematics in 1929. She completed doctoral studies in 1952.

== In Great Britain, 1940s–1960s ==
In the 1940s, Brooke was based at the Emergency Medical Service Statistical Branch in Norcross, and studied wartime health issues, including battle exhaustion, burns, and gastric ulcers. She was elected a fellow of the Royal Statistical Society in 1943.

In the 1950s, Brooke was a statistician in the Medical Statistics branch of the General Register Office. She attended the Second World Congress of Psychiatry in Zürich in 1957, and presented a paper on schizophrenia. She also attended the International Congress on Mental Health in Paris in 1961.

Brooke was co-author of The survey of sickness, 1943 to 1952 (1957, with W. P. D. Logan), and author of A cohort study of patients first admitted to mental hospitals in 1954 and 1955 (1963) and A census of patients in psychiatric beds, 1963 (1967).

== International work, 1960s–1970s ==
Brooke spoke at a mental health conference in Pennsylvania in 1964. She was chief of the Department of Medical Information and Statistics at the University Institute of Social and Preventive Medicine in Lausanne. She was a collaborating investigator on the World Health Organization's International Pilot Study of Schizophrenia in the late 1960s. In 1977 she spoke at an WHO workshop on "the medico-social risks of alcohol consumption" in Luxembourg.

Brooke wrote and edited policy reports for the World Health Organization and other international bodies, including The methodology of psychiatric out-patient data collection (1973), The current and future use of registers in health information systems (1974), Suicide and attempted suicide (1974), and Activities in the field of drug dependence (European region) (1975).

== Death ==
Brooke died in 1989. A colleague wrote in an obituary that "Miss Brooke was precious to WHO's programmes because she was a statistician who liked to assemble data, enjoyed handling them and had the ability to present them without ever losing sight of the broader context in which these data were gathered." Her papers are held in the Mile End Library, Queen Mary University of London.

== Selected journal publications ==
- "Battle Exhaustion: Review of 500 Cases from Western Europe" British Medical Journal, 1946
- "Trends in the mental hospital population and their effect on future planning", The Lancet, 1961. (with G. C. Tooth)
- "More and More Barbiturates" Medicine, Science and the Law, 1964. (with M. M. Glatt)
- "Problems in determining the needs for mental health facilities in Britain" Journal of Clinical Epidemiology, 1964. (with John H. Mabry)
- "Some Aspects of Suicide in Psychiatric Patients in Southend" The British Journal of Psychiatry, 1968. (with A. A. Robin and Dorothy L. Freeman-Browne)
- "Judgments of trained observers on adverse drug reactions" Clinical Pharmacology & Therapeutics, 1979. (with Sylviane Blanc, Philippe Leuenberg, and Jean-Louis Schelling)
- "Drug-addiction in the canton of Vaud, 1974–8" Sozial- und Präventivmedizin, 1980. (with A. Delachaux and E. Haller)
