= Henry Brooke (artist) =

Irish artist

- Born: November 1738; County Cavan
- Died: 6 October 1806 (aged 67); Dublin
- Occupation: history painter
- Children: William Henry Brooke
- Parent: Robert Brooke

Henry Brooke (November 1738-6 October 1806) was an Irish history painter who was active in London from 1761 till 1767. Later in life, he was a prominent Methodist in Dublin.

== Life ==
Engraving of Brooke's portrait of his uncle, Henry Brooke.

Henry Brooke was born in County Cavan in November 1738. His parents were Robert, an artist, and Honor Brooke. Brooke's parents were the son and daughter of two brothers, both clergymen of the established church. He had three brothers and one sister. His paternal grandfather, the Revd William Brooke of Rantavan was the rector of the Union of Mullogh, in the diocese of Kilmore. After the death of his younger brother, Brooke was very religious as a child. He was sent to Dublin to study painting at the age of 15, returning home 4 years later, though Walter G. Strickland places his early training with his father. In 1758, the Brooke family moved to Killibegs, County Kildare.

Brooke moved to London in 1761, where he cultivated a reputation as an artist. Following a period away from the church, he became evangelical after a visit to the Tabernacle at Moorfields. Having corresponded with John Wesley from 1762, he became a Methodist in April 1765, hosting Wesley in Dublin years later. He opposed the separation of the Methodist Church from the Church of England.

On 20 April 1767, he married Anne Kirchoffer, in St Paul's Church, Dublin. The couple had 11 children including the portrait painter and illustrator, William Henry Brooke. Brooke had stopped painting, but financial circumstances led to him taking up the profession again.

The Continence of Scipio (circa 1771) National Gallery of Ireland

He became a drawing master working from Stafford Street, Dublin in 1770, and in the same year he exhibited The Raising of Lazarus at the Society of Artists, William Street, Dublin. The majority of his work was used to decorate Catholic chapels. He sent a mythological painting to the Society of Artists, London in 1776. Brooke's portrait of his uncle, Henry Brooke, was reproduced as an engraving for Effigies poeticae (1824). His cousin was the author, Charlotte Brooke.

He died on 6 October 1806 in Dublin. Isaac D'Olier, his son-in-law, noted that he "was a giant in the spiritual combat, whose strength was daily renewed by his continual waiting upon God."

The National Gallery of Ireland hold his only known surviving painting, The Continence of Scipio.
