= Henry James Brooke =

English crystallographer

Henry James Brooke (1771–1857) was an English crystallographer.

== Life ==
Brooke was the son of a broadcloth manufacturer, born in Exeter on 25 May 1771. He studied for the bar, but went into business in the Spanish wool trade, South American mining companies, and the London Life Assurance Association successively.

Brooke's hobbies were mineralogy, geology, and botany. His large collections of shells and of minerals were presented to the University of Cambridge, while a portion of his collection of engravings was given by him to the British Museum. He was elected a Fellow of the Geological Society in 1815, Fellow of the Linnean Society in 1818, Fellow of the Royal Society in 1819, and a Foreign Honorary Member of the American Academy of Arts and Sciences in 1825. . He discovered thirteen new mineral species.

Brooke died at Clapham Rise on 26 June 1857 and was buried at West Norwood Cemetery. The surgeon Charles Brooke was his son.

== Works ==
Brooke published a Familiar Introduction to Crystallography, London, 1823; and contributed the articles on "Crystallography" and "Mineralogy" in the Encyclopædia Metropolitana, in which he first introduced six primary crystalline systems.

== See also ==
- Brookite
- Geometrical crystallography before X-rays
