= Charles Brooke (Jesuit) =

British priest

- Born: 8 August 1777; Exeter, England
- Died: 6 October 1852 (aged 75); Exeter, England

Charles Brooke (8 August 1777–6 October 1852), was an English Jesuit.

Brooke was born at Exeter, Devon, England, on 8 August 1777. He received his education at the English academy at Liège and at Stonyhurst, where he entered the Society of Jesus, of which he became a professed father (1818).

== Career ==
He was provincial of his order from 1826 to 1832, and subsequently made the superior of the seminary at Stonyhurst College. After filling the office of rector of the Lancashire district, he was sent with ill health to Exeter, in 1845, to gather materials for a continuation of the history of the English province from the year 1635, to which period Father Henry More's 'Historia Missionis Anglicanæ Societatis Jesu' extends. The documents and information he collected were afterwards of much service in the compilation of Brother Henry Foley's valuable 'Records of the English Province of the Society of Jesus,' 8 vols. Lond. 1870–83.

== Death ==
Father Brooke died at Exeter on 6 October 1852.
