= Charles Brooks (trade unionist) =

Canadian trade unionist (1915–1977)

- Born: 1915; Windsor, Ontario, Canada
- Died: 1977 (aged 61–62)
- Occupations: union activist, union leader

Charles E. Brooks (1915–1977) was a Canadian labour union activist, the first president of the United Auto Workers Local 444, who was assassinated by an upset employee of Chrysler Motors.

Brooks was born in Windsor, Ontario. Growing up during the Great Depression, he witnessed first-hand the devastation that the Windsor citizens endured at that time, and these experiences brought him into the trade union movement.

== CAW Local 444 ==
Brooks played a key role in the foundation of CAW Local 444, one of the largest locals of the United Auto Workers in Canada. He served as its president for 21 years, from 1956 until his death in 1977, during which time he fought for greater wages and benefits for Chrysler workers. This helped to improve the quality of life and standard of living in Windsor, which was a city that was economically fuelled by the Chrysler, Ford and General Motors plants located in the city. After his death, Local 444 became part of the Canadian Auto Workers in 1985.

== Social programs ==
Brooks also focused much of his time as president pushing social programs as funded by the government including health care, education, housing programs and income support plans. Brooks was instrumental in introducing drug plans through Green Shield and coverage through S. & A. Windsor Medical and Ontario Hospital Plan In addition to these programs, he was also a supporter of the United Way charity organization. Brooks led by personal example and helped raise labour participation to a higher level than anywhere else in Canada.

== Death and legacy ==
In 1977, Brooks was shot dead by a disgruntled Chrysler worker who was disillusioned when Local 444 was unable to get the man's job back after a third discharge. After his death, Brooks' legacy continues to live on in Windsor-Essex County. The Peace Fountain, located in the Detroit River, was erected in honour of him for his efforts toward world peace. The Charles E. Brooks Labour Community Service Award, which is awarded yearly to a citizen for their work in the community, was also created in memory of Brooks.
