= Charles Brooke (surgeon) =

English surgeon and inventor

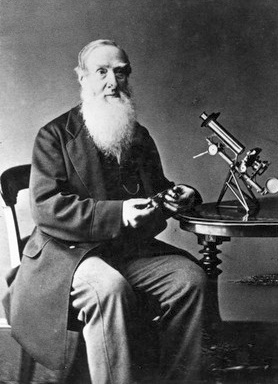
Charles Brooke

Charles Brooke FRMS FRS (30 June 1804 – 17 May 1879) was an English surgeon and inventor.

== Surgical career ==
Brooke, son of the well-known mineralogist, Henry James Brooke, was born 30 June 1804. His early education was carried on at Chiswick, under Dr. Turner. After this he was entered at Rugby School in 1819 and St John's College, Cambridge, where he remained five years. He was twenty-third wrangler and B.A. 1827, B.M. 1828, and M.A. in 1853. During a part of this period he studied medicine, and his professional education was completed at St. Bartholomew's Hospital. He passed the Royal College of Surgeons examination on 3 September 1834, and became a fellow of that institution 26 August 1844. He lectured for one or two sessions on surgery at Dermott's School, and afterwards held positions on the surgical staff of the Metropolitan Free Hospital and the Westminster Hospital, which latter appointment he resigned in 1869.

He is known as the inventor of the bead suture, which was a great step in advance in the scientific treatment of deep wounds. On 4 March 1847 he was elected a Fellow of the Royal Society. He belonged to the Royal Meteorological Society (president 1865–1866) and the Royal Microscopical Society. He also at various times served on the management of the Royal Institution and on the council of the Royal Botanical Society. In addition to these he was connected with many philanthropic and religious societies, and was a very active member of the Victoria Institute and Christian Medical Association.

== Inventions ==
His public papers and lectures generally pertained to the department of physics, mathematical and experimental, and his more special work was the inventing or improving of apparatus and especially of self-recording instruments for scientific use.

Brooke also studied the theory of the microscope, and was the author of some inventions which facilitated the shifting of lenses, and improved the illumination of the bodies observed. He applied his improved methods to the investigation of some of the best known test-objects of the microscope. His name is, however, most popularly known by means of the Elements of Natural Philosophy, originally compiled by Dr. Golding Bird in 1839, who alone brought out the second and third editions. After his death in 1854, Brooke edited a fourth edition, revised and greatly enlarged, followed by a fifth in 1860. In 1867 he entirely rewrote the work for the sixth edition.

== Death ==
He died at Weymouth, 17 May 1879, and his widow died at 3 Gordon Square, London, 12 Feb. 1885, aged 86.

== Automatic registration of instruments by photography ==
Between 1846 and 1852 Charles Brooke invented a series of self-recording instruments for the automatic registration of measurements using a light-source, mirrors and optics to amplify readings and a clockwork drum covered in photographic paper to record the results. These instruments included barometers, thermometers, psychrometers, and magnetometers, which registered their variations by means of photography. Charles Brooke's inventions obtained an award from the British Admiralty as well as a medal from the jurors of the Great Exhibition. The account of the perfecting of these apparatus is detailed in the British Association Reports from 1846 to 1849, and in the Philosophical Transactions of the Royal Society of 1847, 1850, and 1852. These self-recording instruments were adopted at the Royal Observatories of Greenwich and Paris. In 1859 a self-recording magnetometer of United States manufacture, based on the designed of Charles Brooke, was built by the United States Coast Survey and the Smithsonian Institution at a magnetic observatory on the grounds of the Smithsonian Institution in Washington DC. The Smithsonian report also noted that the Toronto Magnetic and Meteorological Observatory had a self-registering magnetograph in 1850, which was described by General John Henry Lefroy, in Silliman's Journal, May, 1850.

A somewhat similar self-registering system invented a little earlier by Francis Ronalds, inaugural Honorary Director at the Kew Observatory, was also deployed to Toronto as well as numerous other observatories around the world. Ronalds' cameras were adopted by the new UK Meteorological Office from the 1860s to assist in weather forecasting and continued in use for many years.

== Published works ==
- Elements of Natural Philosophy, editor of the fourth edition (1854) and fifth edition (1860), rewrote entirely for the sixth edition (1867)
- The Evidence afforded by the Order and Adaptations in Nature to the Existence of a God. A Christian Evidence lecture, 1872, which was three times printed,
- A Synopsis of the Principal Formulæ and Results of Pure Mathematics, 1829.
- Books by Charles Brooke available in the Internet Archive
- Books by Charles Brooke available in Google Books
- Papers by Charles Brooke available in Google Scholar
