= James Brooks =

James, Jim, or Jimmy Brooks may refer to:

== Arts and entertainment ==
- James Brooks (musician) (1760–1809), English violinist and composer
- James Brooks (painter) (1906–1992), American painter
- James Brooks, guitarist with British post-rock band Appliance
- James Brooks Jr. or Stephen Brooks (1942–1999), American actor
- James G. Brooks (1801–1841), American newspaper editor and poet
- James L. Brooks (born 1940), American producer, writer and film director
- Jimmy Brooks, fictional character on Degrassi: The Next Generation

== Government ==
- James Brooks (civil servant) (1863–1941), British Admiralty Director of Victualling
- James Brooks (politician) (1810–1873), United States Representative from New York
- James Brooks (Texas Ranger) (1855–1944), American lawman

== Sports ==
- James Brooks (defensive end) (born 1988), American football player and coach
- James Brooks (running back) (born 1958), American football player
- James Brooks (rugby union) (born 1980), English rugby player
- Jim Brooks, co-owner of the Lehigh Valley Phantoms ice hockey team

== Others ==
- James Brooks (architect) (1825–1901), English architect
- James Brooks (bishop) (1512–1558), Bishop of Gloucester
- James Brooks (priest) (1704–1763), Anglican clergyman
- James F. Brooks (born 1955), American historian
- James S. Brooks (1944–2014), American physicist

== See also ==
- James Brooks House (disambiguation)
- James Brook (1897–1989), English cricketer
- James Brooke (disambiguation)
- James Hall Brookes (1830–1897), American religious writer
- Jamie Brooks (born 1983), English football player
