= James Brooke (disambiguation) =

James Brooke (1803–1868) was the first White Rajah of Sarawak.

James Brooke may also refer to:

- James Brooke (journalist) (born 1955), American journalist
- James Anson Otho Brooke (1884–1914), Scottish recipient of the Victoria Cross
- James Brooke (Montgomery County, Maryland), Quaker, see Brookeville, Maryland
- James Brooke (DJ) (born 1986), Australian DJ & radio host

== See also ==
- James Brook (1897–1989), English cricketer
- James Brooks (disambiguation)
