= Anthony Shaw =

Anthony or Tony Shaw may refer to:

- Anthony Shaw (violinist) (1747–1792), English violinist
- Anthony Shaw (British Army officer) (1930–2015), director general of the Army Medical Services
- Tony Shaw (Australian rules footballer) (born 1960), Australian rules footballer
- Tony Shaw (rugby union) (born 1953), Australian rugby union player
- Antony Shaw, New Zealand barrister and law professor
