= James Brooks (musician) =

English violinist and composer of the second half of the 18th century

- Born: c.1760 Bath, Somerset, England
- Died: December 1809 (aged 49); London, England
- Resting place: unknown
- Occupations: Violinist; Composer
- Spouse: Ann Barnard Brooks (c.1760-1821)
- Children: Caroline Brooks (born probably c.1782)
- Parent(s): John Brooks (father, violinist); Sarah Brooks (mother)

James Brooks was an English violinist and composer who was born in Bath c. 1760 and died in London in December 1809.

== Early life ==
James Brooks must have been born around 1760 as he was declared to be 23 years old when he was recommended for admission to the Royal Society of Musicians in March 1783.

His father, John Brooks, was a violinist in Thomas Linley's band, in the band of the theatre and a music teacher in Bath, where he died before 1787.

At eleven years old James was already playing alongside his father at the New Assembly Rooms under Linley, however, according to the recommendation for his admission to the Royal Society of Musicians in March 1783, he started his fully fledged professional career as a musician around 1776.

== Career as a musician ==
It seems that James Brooks took over from Thomas Shaw as first violin, once the latter had moved to London, in the concerts organised by Herschel. For instance, on 12 October 1778, the Salisbury and Winchester Journal advertises as follows:

MUSIC MEETING.
ON Thurſday the 15th of October inſtant, will be a SACRED PERFORMANCE of Vocal and Inſtrumental MUSIC, in the Church at Trowbridge. — The muſic taken from the Oratorio of the Meſſhiah, with Mr. Handel's Coronation Anthems The King ſhall rejoice, and Zadock the Prieſt. 
The principal Vocal Parts by Miſs CANTELO, and Mr. CORFE from Saliſbury. The Firſt Violin by Mr. BROOKS, junr. The other parts of the inſtrumental band by the moſt approved performers in Bath, &c, and the Choruſes will be particularly full. The whole to be conducted Mr. HERSCHEL. —Service will begin at eleven o'clock. 
Particulars of the performance will be expreſſed in the bills and given with the tickets. — Tickets 2s. 6d. each to be had at the George Inn, at Trowbridge, and of Mr. BROOKS, King's-mead-ſtreet, Bath.

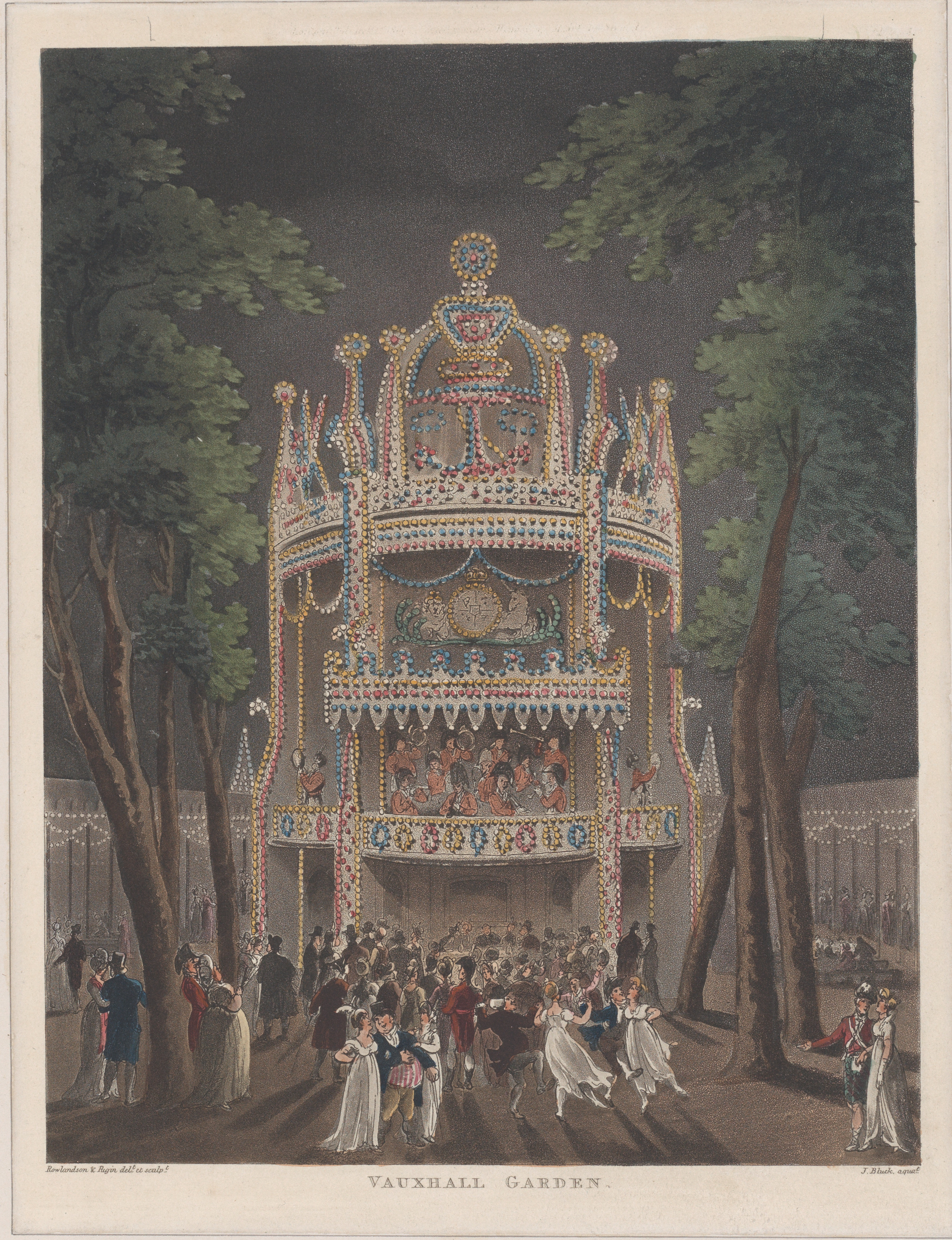
Vauxhall Garden c. 1809 by Thomas Rowlandson. "Tree-lined walks were adorned with statues and architectural elements and pavilions offered refreshment and entertainment [...] buildings were brilliantly lit and nightly attractions included concerts and fireworks. Here, a military band plays on the balcony of a [...] pavilion, as people dine below and couples dance outside. By the early 19th century it cost 3s. 6d. to enter Vauxhall [...] the season [...] lasted from May to August."

And on Thursday 27 May 1779, the Bath Chronicle and Weekly Gazette has the following advertisement for the premiere of a series of shows in Bath in the style of the Vauxhall Pleasure Gardens of London:

BATH SPRING-GARDENS VAUXHALL. 
ON Wednesday next, the 2d of June, will be the Firſt MUSICAL EVENING's ENTERTAINMENT, with illuminations and improvements, after the manner of Vauxhall, London. The principal vocal part by Miſs Cantelo, Mrs. Higgins, and Mr. Du-Bellamy; the firſt violin by Mr. Brooks, jun. a concerto on the clarionet [sic.] by Mr. Alexander Herſchel, and the direction of the muſic by Mr. Herſchel, fen. 
This entertainment will be divided into three acts, the firſt of which will begin it ſeven o'clock. 
Ticket! to be had it the gate of the Gardens, and at Miſs Purdie's Perfume-ſhop, top of the North Parade, at 1s. each.
Public Tea and Spring-Gardens every Saturday Evening when the wheather is fine, attended with French-Horns and Clarionets [sic.]. 
Admittance 1s. which entitles the bearer to Tea or Coffee.

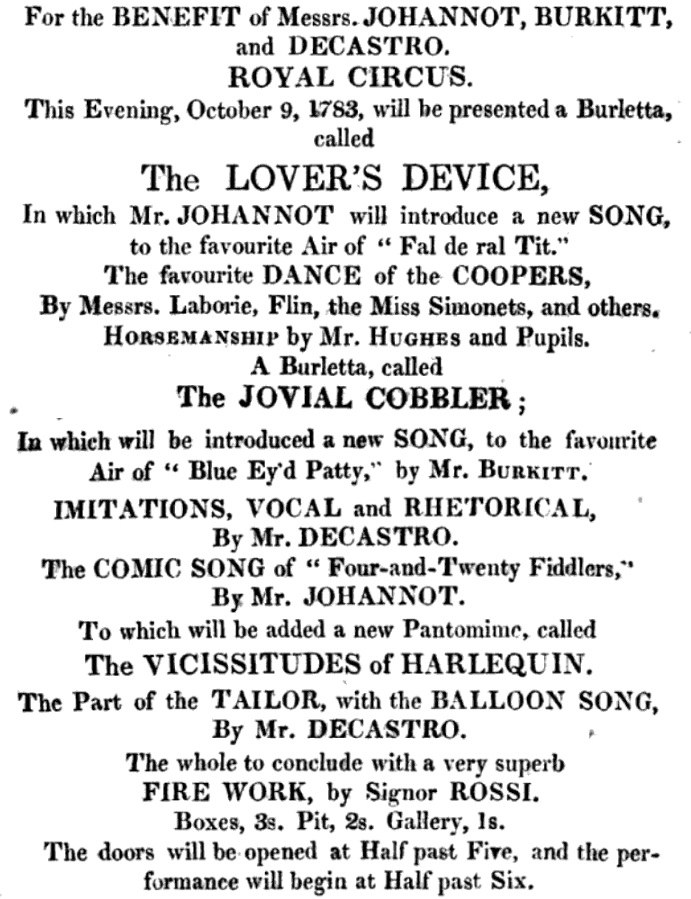
Bill for the burletta The Lovers' Device (Royal Circus, London, 1783)

By his twenties, James Brooks, it seems, had already made quite a place for himself in the community of Bathonian musicians. On Thursday 11 May 1780 he is once again listed as band leader in a special event, as advertised by the Bath Chronicle and Weekly Gazette:

Miſs CANTELO moſt reſpectfully informs the Nobility, Gentry, and her Friends in particular, that her BREAKFAST CONCERT of Vocal and Inſtrumental MUSIC, will be at Mr. Gyde's Rooms on Monday the 15th May inſtant. The vocal parts by Miſs Cantelo, Mr. Griffin, Mr Stevens, &c. the firſt violin by Mr. Brooks, jun. and the harpſichord by Mr. Markordt.
The words of the songs, glees and catches, will be given at the door the morning of performance. Clarinets and Horns during breakfast, which will be on the table at ten o'clock; the Concert to begin at half paſt eleven. Tickets to be had at Mr Gyde's Rooms, Pump-Room, and of Miſs Cantelo in Orchard-ſtreet, at 3s. 6d. each, Breakfast included.

He played a concerto of his own composition in a concert in Bath on 23 April 1782 or 1783, but in March 1783, as per the recommendation for his admission to the Royal Society of Musicians, James Brooks is "engaged at the opera &c", in London. Indeed, on Saturday 9 October 1783 is represented at the Royal Circus the burletta A Lover's Device, which includes two songs composed by Brooks: As when some Maiden in her Teens, sung by Mr Burkitt, and Now Home again from foreign Climes, sung by Mr Burkitt and Miss Romanzini.

He is likely to be the "Mr Brooks" who played first violin at the Commemoration of Handel (Handel Memorial Concerts at Westminster Abbey and the Pantheon from 26 May to 5 June 1784) for which a total of 493 performers were gathered together.

In 1792 and 1794 he plays at the annual spring concerts at St Paul's for the benefit of the clergy, but in parallel is listed in the bills for a concert in Bristol in the 1790s and carries on playing at concerts there in 1791, 1792 and 1798.

In 1800 he became the band leader at Vauxhall, "in the place of Mr Mountain". This gave him the opportunity to further compose and publish songs, and most probably also instrumental music, for the pleasure gardens there, for instance William and Ann, Damon and Phillis, Ere my dear Laddie gade to Sea, When Britain's Sons to Arms are led and How sweetly did the Moments pass sung by popular singers such as the tenor Charles Dignum and the likes. He is employed again at Vauxhall Gardens, as band leader, in 1807 and 1808. He may have worked there many more times, but the sources are patchy and unlikely to reflect the true extend of his activities there. He received positive reviews during his time there; the writer John Feltham for instance said of Brooks that:

[He] select[ed] his music with great taste and judgment, and perform[ed] with much éclat

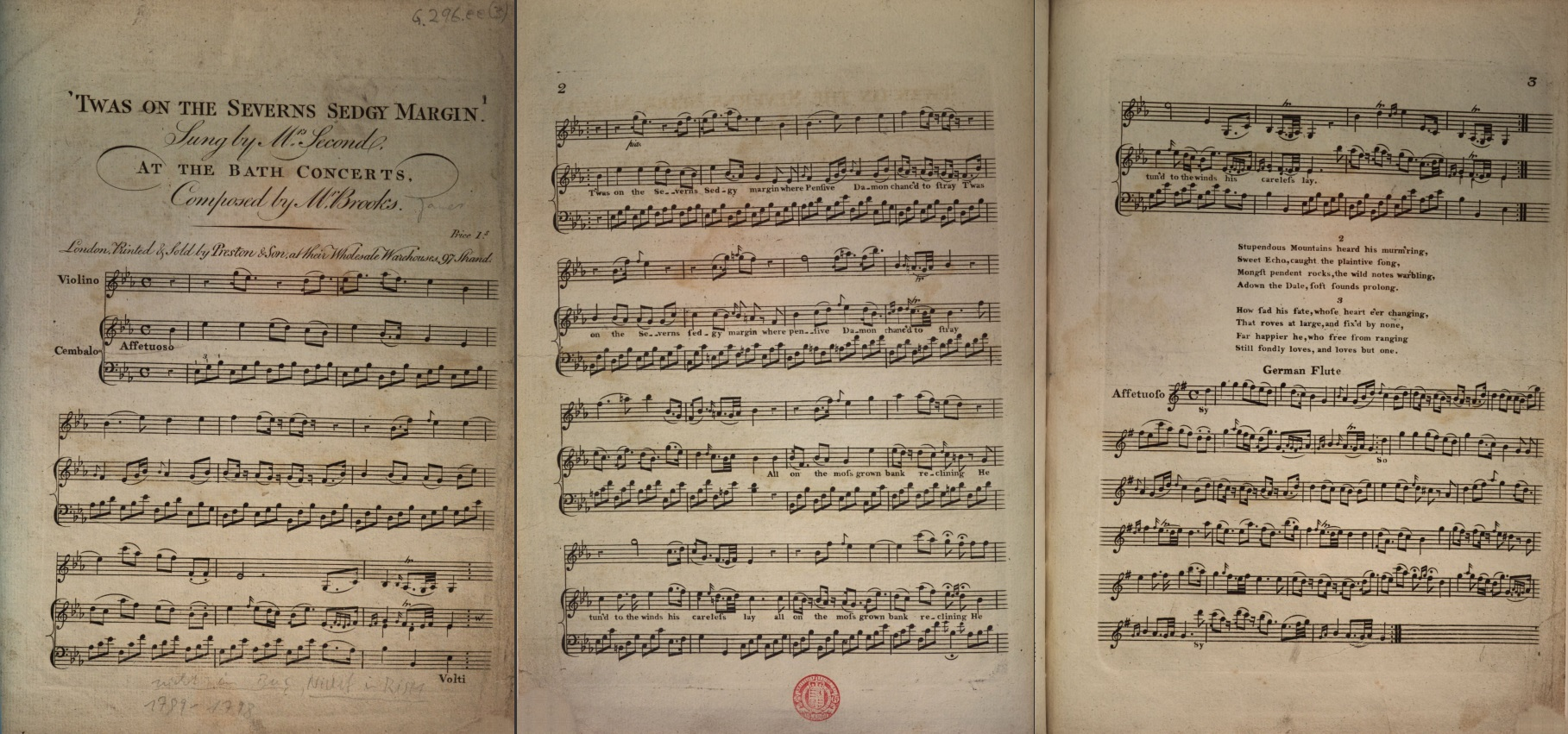
The score of the song "'Twas on the Severn Sedgy Margin." Sung by Mrs. Seconds. At the Bath Concerts. Composed by Mr. Brooks. Price 1s. London, Printed and Sold by Preston & Son, at their Wholesale Warehouses, 97 Strand., including a separate part for "German Flute" (i.e., transverse flute).

In 1804, when George III suffered another bout of his illness, James Brooks composed an hymn for the sovereign's recovery.

He may also have played under Thomas Shaw at the Drury Lane theatre for the 1807–08 season.

== Illness and death ==
James seems to have fallen ill in the second half of 1809 and eventually died in December of the same year. The Royal Society of Musicians had granted him 5 guineas "on account of his illness" in October. After his death, his widow was granted £8 for the funeral costs (£372.20 in today's money) and £2 12s 6d monthly (£122.13 in today's money) as a support allowance.

== Works ==
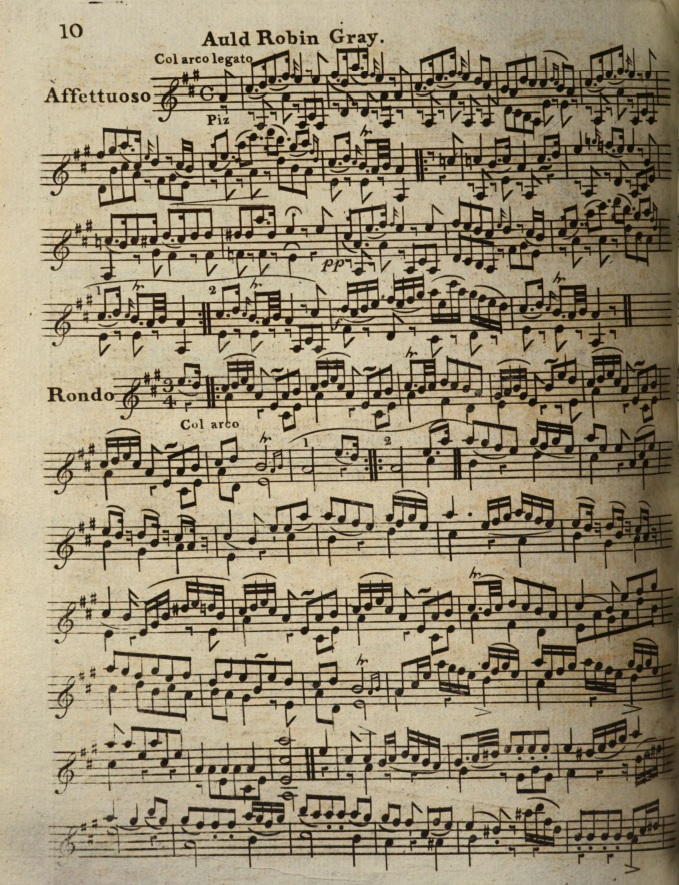
Affetuoso, based on the Scots ballad Auld Robin Gray, and beginning of the Rondo, from Duett II in Two Duetts for One Performer on the Violin, op.4 by James Brooks (page 10). The virtuoso writing includes, among other things, left-hand pizzicati, and a partial descending scale of 10ths.

=== Instrumental music ===
Violin Concerto No.1 in D major ("No.1: A Concerto for the Violin in Nine parts", published in London c.1785 and again in c.1792)
Thirty six select Pieces for a military band (c.1796) (possibly composed for Vauxhall)

=== Chamber music ===
Three duets for two violins, op.3
Two Duetts for One Performer on the Violin, op.4 (c.1802)
Twelve English Ballads, adapted for the Piano Forte, & Harp, with an Accompaniment (ad libitum) for a Flute or Violin, op.5 (published c.1800 or 1805)
Nocturne for the Pianoforte and Violoncello, Violin or Flute. (published posthumously)
Sonata, for the Piano Forte in which is introduced the favorite air of "When forc'd from dear Hebe to go" (by Thomas Arne) with an accompaniment for the violin (c.1805)

=== Vocal music ===
Glees and Madrigals:
- Twelve Glees for Three & Four Voices (c.1796)
- A Second Sett of Twelve Glees for Three & Four Voices. (c.1798)
- Dimpled Pleasure
Songs and ballads, including:
- 'Twas on the Severn's sedgy margin (Bath, c.1795)
- The Shepherd's daughter Sally
- Three cheers to the man who first planted the vine (published posthumously)
- Louisa (1788)
- Young Damon was a Shepherd Boy (c.1800)
- The Tambourine (c.1800)
- A bonny soldier's bride I'll be (1803)
- Our King and ourselves (1803)
- Henry
- The Vine, a favorite Bacchanalian Song (1808)
for Vauxhall Gardens:
- William and Ann (published by Lewis, Houston & Hyde, c.1795 or 1797)
- Damon and Phillis. Pastoral Dialogue (c.1800)
- Ere my dear Laddie gade to Sea (c.1800)
- When Britains Sons to Arms are led (c.1800)
- How sweetly did the Moments pass. (c.1800)
Stage works:
- In The Lovers Device, the songs: Now Home again from foreign Climes, As when some Maiden in her Teens.
- When the trumpet to battle shall call (c.1800-05)

=== Religious music ===
Hymn supplicating the Restoration of our Beloved Sovereign's Health (1804)

== Discography ==
- The Violin Concerto No.1 in D is available on:

English Classical Violin Concertos, Elizabeth Wallfisch, The Parley of Instruments, Peter Holman (Helios, CDH55260, 2008)

== Sources ==
- Highfill, Philip H.; Burnim, Kalman A.; Langhans, Edward A. (1973). A Biographical Dictionary of Actors, Actresses, Musicians, Dancers, Managers & Other Stage Personnel in London, 1660-1800. SIU Press. p. 355.
- European Magazine and London Review.
- British Newspaper Archive
