= Alfred Swaine Taylor =

English toxicologist and medical writer (1806–1880)

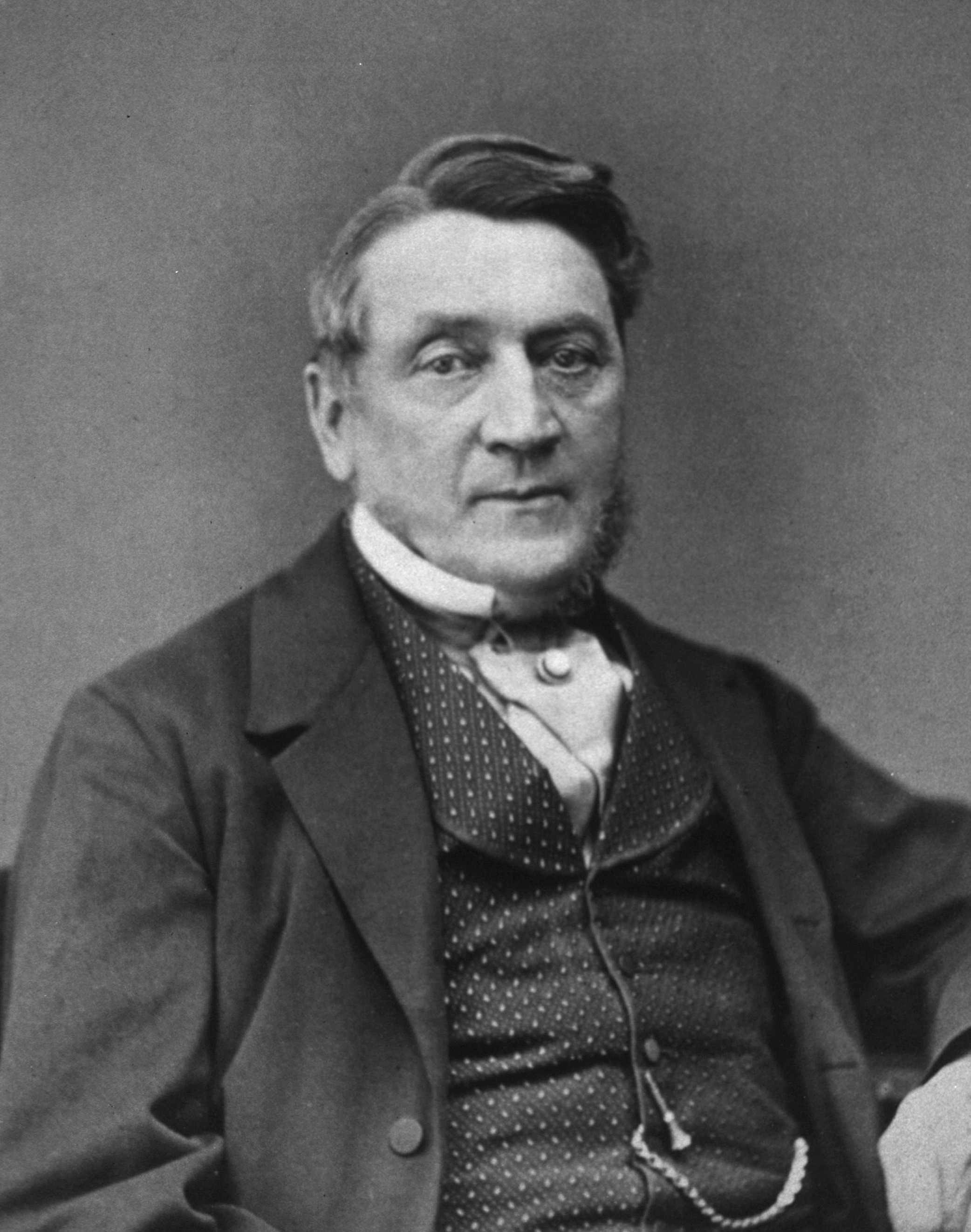
- Born: 11 December 1806; Northfleet, Kent, UK
- Died: 27 May 1880 (aged 73); London, England
- Burial place: Highgate Cemetery
- Occupations: Toxicologist, Surgeon, Chemist, Forensic Scientist, Expert witness, Author
- Years active: 1831–1870
- Spouse: Caroline Cancellor (m. 1834; died 1876)
- Children: 2

Alfred Swaine Taylor (11 December 1806 in Northfleet, Kent – 27 May 1880 in London) was an English toxicologist and medical writer, who has been called the "father of British forensic medicine". He was also an early experimenter in photography.

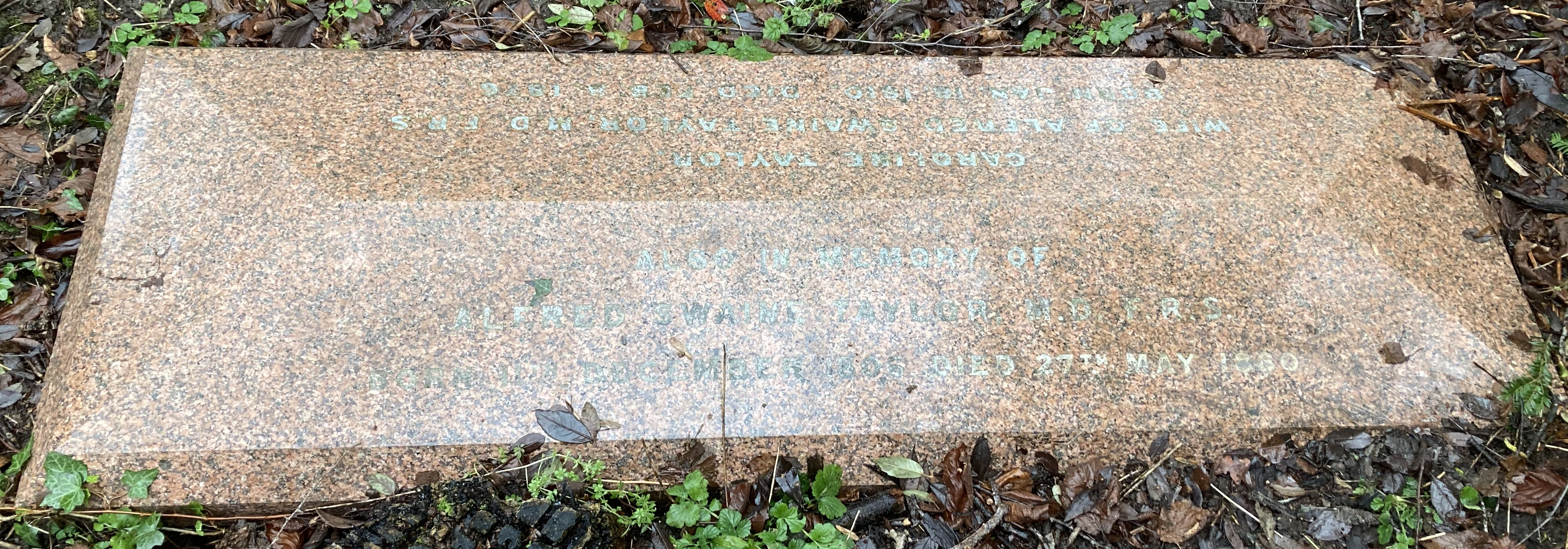
Grave of Alfred Swaine Taylor in Highgate Cemetery (west side)

== Career ==
Taylor studied medicine at Guy's Hospital and St Thomas's Hospital and was appointed Lecturer in Medical Jurisprudence at Guy's Hospital in 1831. In 1832 he succeeded Alexander Barry as joint Lecturer on Chemistry with Arthur Aitken. He published textbooks on medical jurisprudence and toxicology, contributed to the Dublin Quarterly Journal and medical periodicals, and edited the Medical Gazette. He was the main dissector of Lavinia Edwards's body, a woman who was determined to have been born male, and he wrote extensively about her. He appeared as expert witness in several widely reported murder cases such as that of Thomas Smethurst for the murder of Isabella Bankes. He also developed the use of hyposulphate of lime as a fixing agent for photography.

He is buried at Highgate Cemetery.

== Works ==
- On the Art of Photogenic Drawing, 1840
- The Elements of Medical Jurisprudence Interspersed with a copious selection of curious and instructive cases and analyses of opinions delivered at coroners' inquests, 1843
- Manual of Medical Jurisprudence, 1844
- Medical jurisprudence, 1845
- A thermometric table on the scales of fahrenheit, centigrade and Reaumur, compressing the most remarkable phenomena connected with temperature, 1845
- On the Temperature of the Earth and Sea in Reference to the Theory of Central Heat, 1846
- On poisons in relation to medical jurisprudence and medicine, 1848
- On poisoning by strychnia, with comments on the medical evidence at the trial of William Palmer for the murder of John Parsons Cook, 1856
- The principles and practice of medical jurisprudence, 1865
