= James S. Brooks =

American experimental physicist (1944–2014)

- Born: July 18, 1944; Chicago, Illinois, United States
- Died: September 27, 2014 (aged 70); Alligator Point, Florida, United States
- Education: University of California, Berkeley (BA); University of Oregon (PhD)
- Awards: APS Fellow (1999)
- Scientific career
- Workplaces: Florida State University; National High Magnetic Field Laboratory; Boston University
- Doctoral advisor: Russell J. Donnelly

James Stephen Brooks (July 18, 1944 – September 27, 2014) was an American physicist who specialized in experimental physics at high magnetic fields and cryogenic temperatures. He was a professor at Florida State University and director of the Condensed Matter Experimental Group at the National High Magnetic Field Laboratory.

== Biography ==
Brooks was born in Chicago, Illinois, on July 18, 1944, and was raised in Los Alamos, New Mexico, where the Los Alamos National Laboratory is located. His father was a chemical engineer who participated in the Manhattan Project.

He graduated from the University of California, Berkeley, in 1966, and earned his PhD from the University of Oregon under the supervision of Russell J. Donnelly in 1973.

He was a postdoctoral researcher at the University of Minnesota and then at the University of Massachusetts Amherst. In 1979, he took up a position as an assistant professor at Boston University, being promoted to professor in 1991. In 1994, he moved to Florida State University, where he was the Grace and William Moulton Professor of Physics and Chair of the Department of Physics. He also served as a director of the Condensed Matter Experimental Group at the National High Magnetic Field Laboratory until his death.

In 1999, he was elected a Fellow of the American Physical Society for his "experiments measuring magneto-transport properties in organic conductors".

He died on September 27, 2014, at his home in Alligator Point, Florida.

== Research ==
Brooks specialized in experimental physics at high magnetic fields and cryogenic temperatures. He enabled studies in this field by constructing experimental environments combining high-field resistive magnets and dilution refrigerators, which he used to conduct research on superfluidity, heavy fermion materials, organic conductors, and organic superconductors.

== Selected publications ==
- Schrieffer, J. Robert; Brooks, James S., eds. (2007). Handbook of High-Temperature Superconductivity Theory and Experiment. Springer New York, NY. doi:10.1007/978-0-387-68734-6. ISBN 9780387350714.
