= Thomas Shaw (composer) =

English musician and composer of the second half of the 18th century

- Born: c. 1752 probably Bath, Somerset, England
- Died: 28 June 1827 (aged 74) or c.1830 probably Paris, France
- Resting place: unknown
- Citizenship: English, British
- Occupations: Violinist; Violist; Clarinettist; Composer
- Spouse: Mrs "Thomas Shaw Jun." (actress)
- Parent(s): Thomas Shaw (father, 1715–92, Contrabassist)
- Relatives: Anthony Shaw (brother, 1747–92, violinist)

Thomas Shaw, also known as Thomas Shaw Jr, was an English violinist, violist, clarinettist and composer who was born c.1752, probably in Bath. His earliest performances took place in Bath and Bristol, but the majority of his career was spent at the Drury Lane theatre in London as an instrumentalist, violin soloist, band leader, musical director and in-house composer. He later moved to Paris and probably died there on 28 June 1827 or c.1830.

== Early life ==
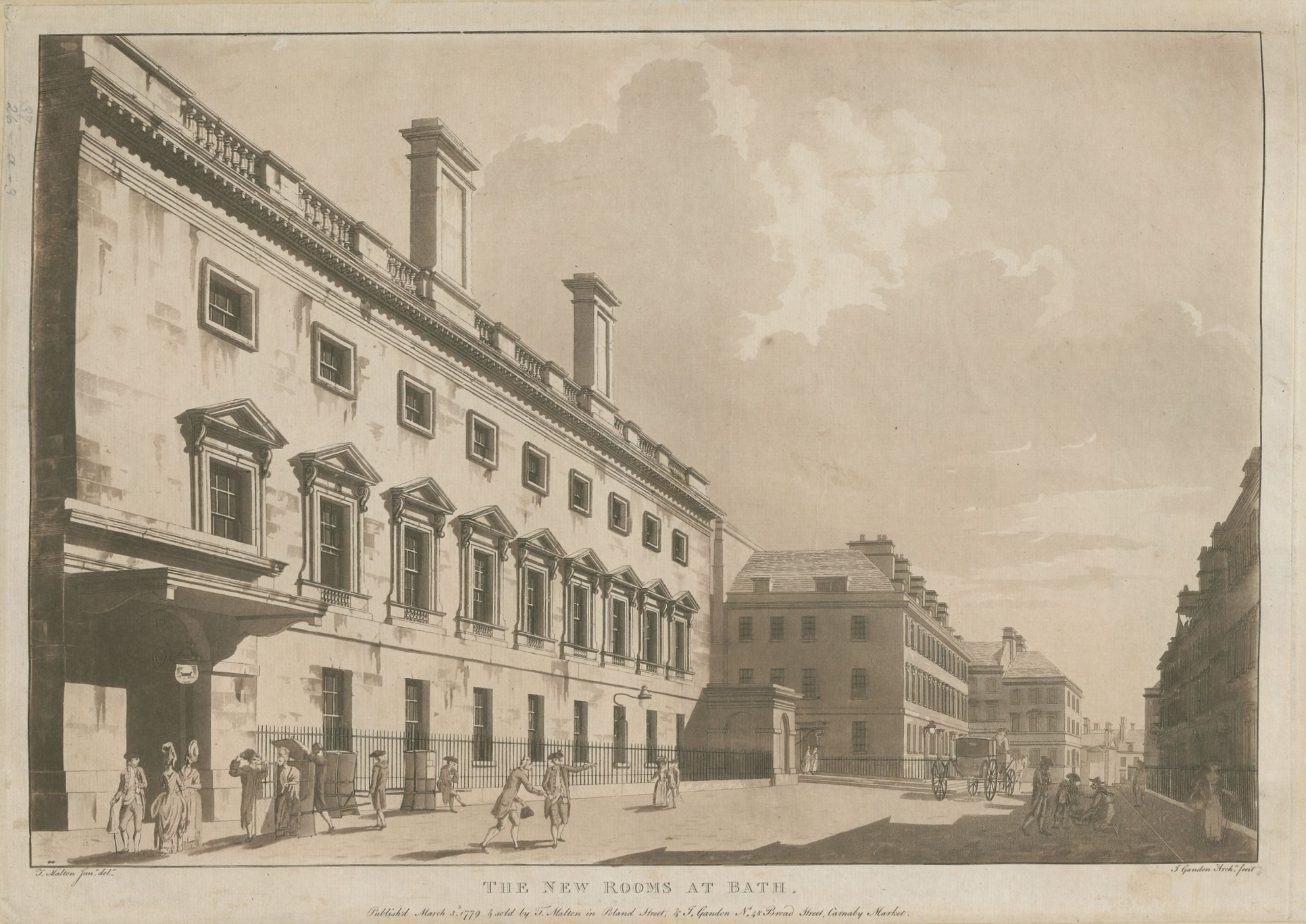
The New Rooms at Bath. Publish'd March 3d 1779 & sold by T. Malton in Poland Street, & J. Gandon No. 48 Broad Street, Carnaby Market. (James Gandon, 1779, The BL King's Topographical Collection, British Library shelfmark: Maps K.Top.37.26.a.3.)

Born around 1752, Thomas Shaw Jr was the son of Thomas Shaw of Bath, musician, concert director and member of the Royal Society of Musicians. Shaw Jr's elder brother was the violinist Anthony Shaw. Their father appears to have lived a long life, being described as superannuated in his obituary.

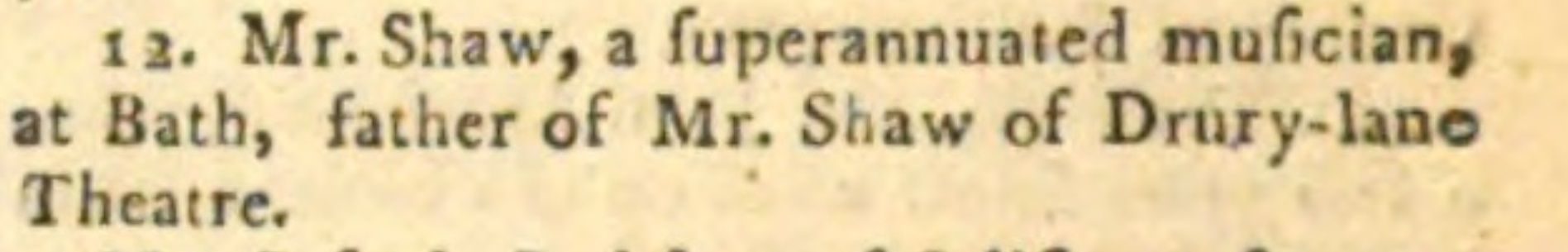
Obituary of Thomas Shaw Sr, Jan 1792, European Magazine and London Review

== Career ==
=== Early performances ===
Shaw Jr gave his earliest known performance in Bath in April 1769 when he was about seventeen. Around this time, he led the orchestra in Thomas Linley's subscription concerts of the autumn 1769 and spring 1770, and was a member of the theatre band in 1771. In addition, his music was being performed and published; an overture composed by him was played in a concert at the end of December 1771 and by 1772 he was playing his own compositions in Bath and Bristol.

He performed in the area until 1774, with his last known local performances in Bristol and Bath. According to musicologist Peter Holman, Shaw remained active as a violinist there until 1776–77.

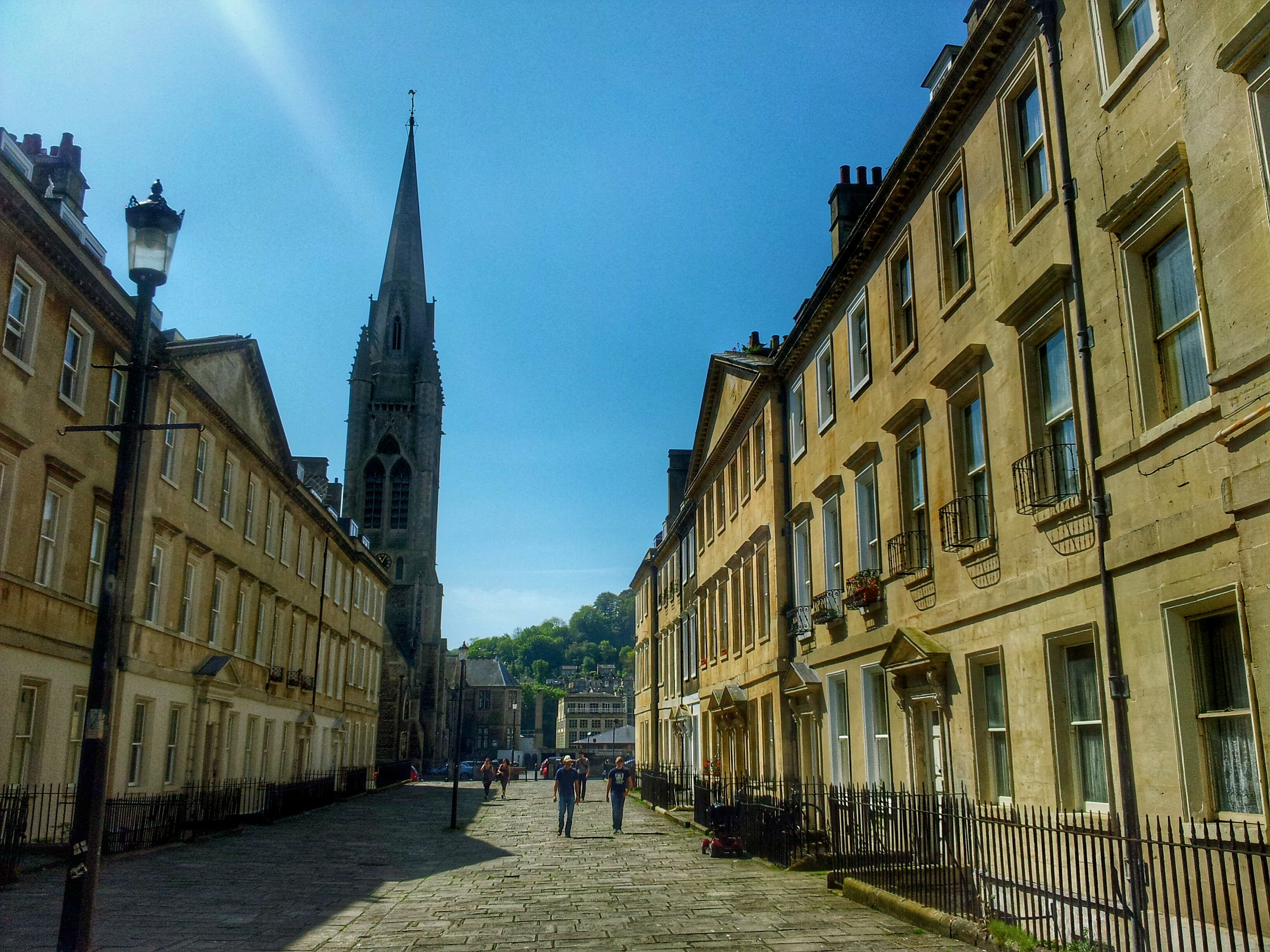
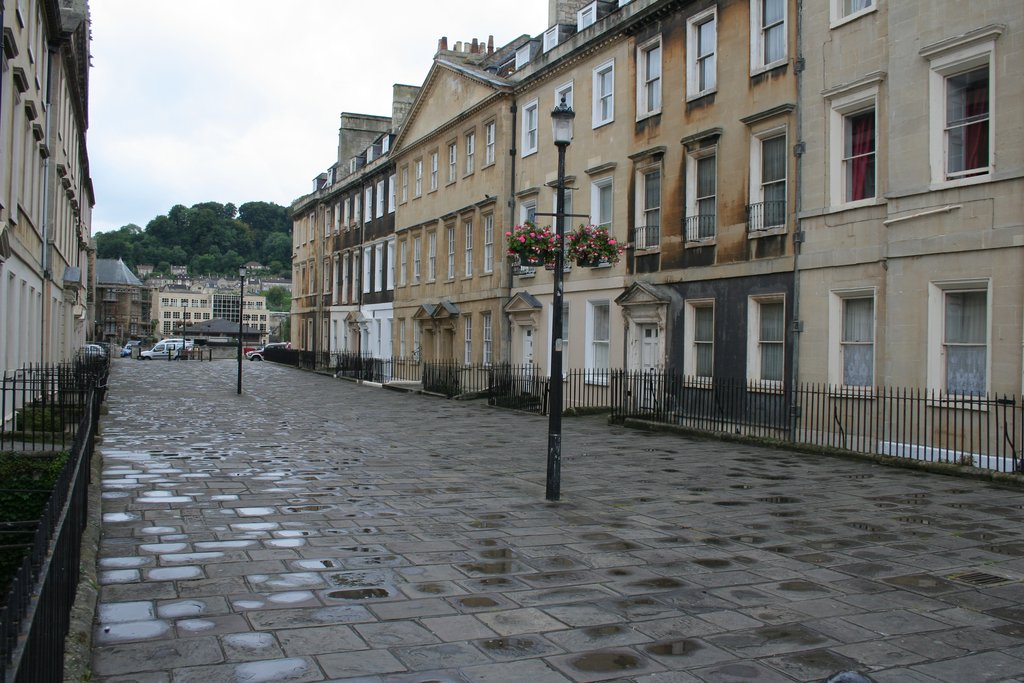
Duke Street (Bath, Somerset), where Thomas Shaw lived c. December 1772

=== Tension with Thomas Linley ===
Shaw was described by the press as a talented instrumentalist who played the violin "in a very masterly Manner and with much Taste". This allegedly led to competition with Thomas Linley (junior), with the press comparing the two violinists. While Shaw was considered 'the most perfect Master of the Fingerboard", Linley was deemed to have "a graceful Manner of bowing" and "a 'Polish' of Tone and Manner".

Allegedly, the underlying tension was due to the quasi-monopoly the Linley family had over concert life in Bath and Bristol. According to historians, Shaw joined the ranks and became a leading member of the breakaway group of musicians headed by William Herschel, which began to challenge the Linleys' hold. During the spring of 1772, Herschel and Shaw gave a certain number of concerts together, Shaw on the violin and Herschel on the fortepiano.

On Thursday 4 June 1772 and on Thursday 11 June 1772 the Bath Chronicle and Weekly Gazette advertised the following:

BRISTOL. AT the Aſſembly-Room in Princeſs-Street, on Thurſday Evening the 11th of June, under the Conduct of Mr. HERSCHEL and Mr. SHAW, jun. will be a CONCERTO SPIRITUALE Or, SACRED PERFORMANCE. Conſiſting of the famous MISERERE of Signior Gregorio Allegri, ſung at the Pope's Chapel in Rome on good Friday, with the ſolemn POPULE MEUS of Petrus Aloyſius Preneſtinus (performed but once in England). Also Part of the celebrated STABAT MATER of Signior Auriſchio and Pergoleſi. with Choruſes from the Psalms of Sig. Benedetto Marcello, with Inſtrumental Accompaniments, by Mr. Herſchell. The principal Vocal Parts by the two Signora's Farinelli; a Concerto on the Hautboy by Mr. Herſchel; the firſt Violin, and a Solo by Mr. Shaw, jun. The Chorus from Bath, Wells, Bristol, &c – To begin at Half paſt Six o'Clock. Tickets, at 5s. each, to be had at the American, Exchange, and Aſſembly Coffee-Houſes; where alſo may be had, Books of the Performance, with an English Tranſlation of the Latin Part, at 6d. each.

On Thursday 17 December 1772 the Bath Chronicle and Weekly Gazette published an advertisement for another concert by the Herschel/Shaw duo in Bath; this time, for the benefit of the 20 year old Shaw himself:

AT the Old Aſſembly Rooms, on TUESDAY, Dec. 22, will be a CONCERT of Vocal and Inſtrumental Muſic, for Mr. SHAW, Jun. The Vocal Part by Signora FARINELLI, and Maſter PECK. The Firſt Violin by Mr. SHAW, Jun. The Hautboy by Mr. FISCHER. And the Harpſichord by Mr. HERSCHEL. To begin at a Quarter paſt Six o'Clock. - Particulars of the Concert will be inſerted in the Bills. Tickets to be had of Mr. SHAW, Jun. in Duke-Street, at Mr. Gydes Rooms, the Bookſellers and Coffee-Houſes, at Five Shillings each.

Around 1776, Shaw decided to seek a more promising future in London, his brother Anthony was already working there as a musician. Shaw was then still in his early 20s and had already been in contact with London audiences when he played some of his music at the Vauxhall Gardens in 1773.

The tensions and difficulties with the Linleys might have played a part in his decision to leave Bath; though, even in London, he would be employed by them and would be working alongside them (especially Linley Sen., William Linley and Sheridan).

By 1778, Shaw Jr was a regular London player, performing in the band at Drury Lane theatre and the Haymarket. In September 1780, aged 28, he was recommended for membership of the Royal Society of Musicians.

== Career in London ==
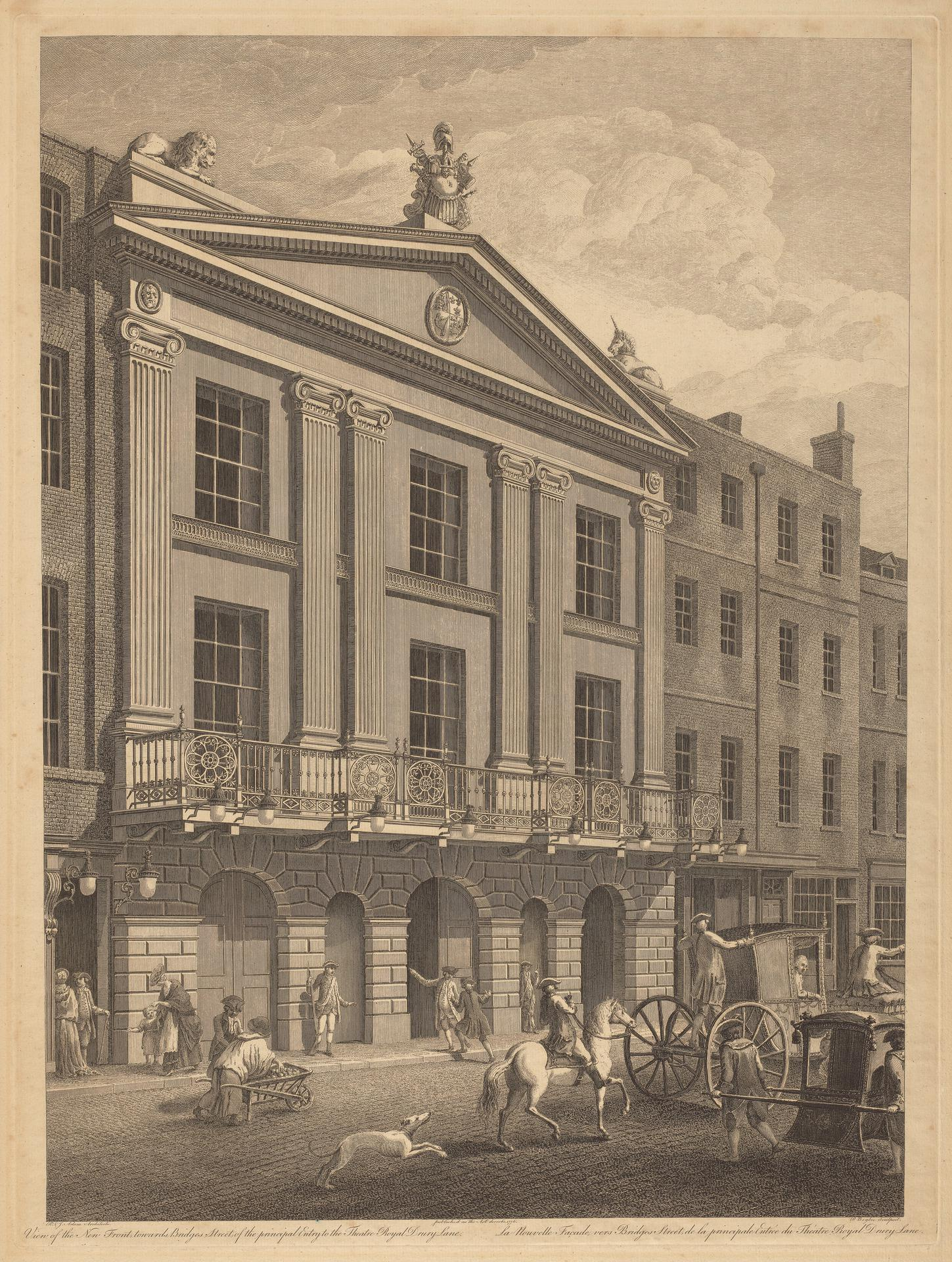
View of Theatre Royal, Drury Lane, c. 1776

Documents show that during the early 1790s, Shaw was employed a few times at the Vauxhall Gardens as musician and composer. He may have worked there many more times, but the sources are patchy and may not reflect the true extent of his activities there.

Shaw was employed as leader of the band for "A Grand Selection" concert on Friday 15 February 1793 at the King's Opera House Haymarket. As per its title, the event, conducted by Linley Sr and Arnold, included a vast array of music from Purcell to Mozart, and including Handel, Vinci, Paisiello, T. Arne, Linley, Arnold.

Shaw played on the violin the obbligato part, originally for transverse flute, in the aria Sweet Bird from Handel's L'Allegro, il Penseroso ed il Moderato, accompanying Mrs Ferguson's first performance on Wednesday 6 March 1793 at the Theatre Royal, Haymarket. At the same theatre during August and September 1793, his violin skills were once again put on show as he accompanied, for her first appearance on the London stage, singer Miss Gopell of Bath, by playing the obbligato part in the aria Sweet Echo from the afterpiece Comus.

=== At the Drury Lane ===
By 1778, Shaw had joined the band at the Drury Lane theatre in London. He started leading the band in March 1786, at the occasion of the premiere of Redemption (a pasticcio oratorio made out of works by Handel and Samuel Arnold), and he seems to have retained that post for about 23 years, until 1809.

His violin playing was put on show regularly there, playing, for instance, the obligato parts accompanying the singers in pieces like Handel's L'Allegro, il Penseroso ed il Moderato or executing fully fledged violin concertos in between parts of entertainments or oratorios like Messiah.

As early as 1786, Shaw's role, beyond leading the band and playing solos, involved overall musical direction; indeed, in his Reminiscences, Michael Kelly recounts how during a rehearsal for the English adaptation of Grétry's Richard Coeur-de-lion, in which the celebrated tragedian John Philip Kemble sang the main character, Shaw "called out from the orchestra", reproaching "dear Mr Kemble" for "murdering the time", to which the latter, "calmly, and coolly taking a pinch of snuff," replied that "it [was] better for [him] to murder time at once than be continually beating him as [Shaw] did". Roger Fiske remarks though that Charles Dibdin "thought him a much better leader than Covent Garden's Baumgarten".

In addition to the above roles of soloist, band leader and musical director, Shaw composed music for the Drury Lane theatre's productions. His first such work appears to have been the 1789 afterpiece opera The Island of Saint Marguerite, whose music was partly composed and partly compiled by Shaw.

Other music composed by Shaw for Drury Lane includes chamber music, piano sonatas, a violin concerto as well as various pieces of operatic music (overtures, airs, songs, choruses, marches, vocal duets and trios). His operatic music was either composed as incidental music to new productions, used in lieu of older numbers in reprisal of works by other composers, or inserted in pasticcios.

He wrote an overture and other instrumental interludes for the revival of Michael Arne's Cymon in 1791. According to advertisements both the overture to The Island of Saint Marguerite and the instrumental pieces for Cymon were published in parts, but they seem to have mostly survived in keyboard arrangements, except for a Spiritoso interlude and the Marches in the Procession for which a full score still exists. Thereafter Shaw composed only the occasional song for Drury Lane, even though he later became one of the theatre's proprietors. In 1792, Shaw was still employed by the theatre as 'leader of the band', whilst Linley Sr. was the official 'composer to theatre' and one of the proprietors, and, as late as 1797–1800, Shaw was still employed in the same capacity, whilst, by then, William Linley, had succeeded his father as 'composer to theatre'.

A Grand Selection of Sacred Music from the Works of Handel concert took place on Wednesday 12 March 1794 at the Drury Lane theatre, the stage of which, for the occasion, was decorated to resemble "a Gothic Cathedral, with illuminated stained glass windows". As per his employment status, Shaw took part as leader of the band, playing under the direction of Linley Sr and Stephen Storace. Among the vocal soloists was the internationally known soprano Nancy Storace.

Due to his tenure with the Drury Lane, Shaw was mentioned in The Pin-basket, to the Children of Thespis. A satire, a satirical poem about Londonian theatre life by the critic John Williams whose alter ego, Anthony Pasquin, wonders "who can go see" or "endure" the Drury Lane's plays, actors, and singers [...]

[...] and SHAW* on catgut scrape his sharps and flats,
To moral mice and sentimental rats. [...]
* a Violent Democrat, leader of the Drury-Lane band, and one of the Dictators of that Republic.

== The Island of St Marguerite ==
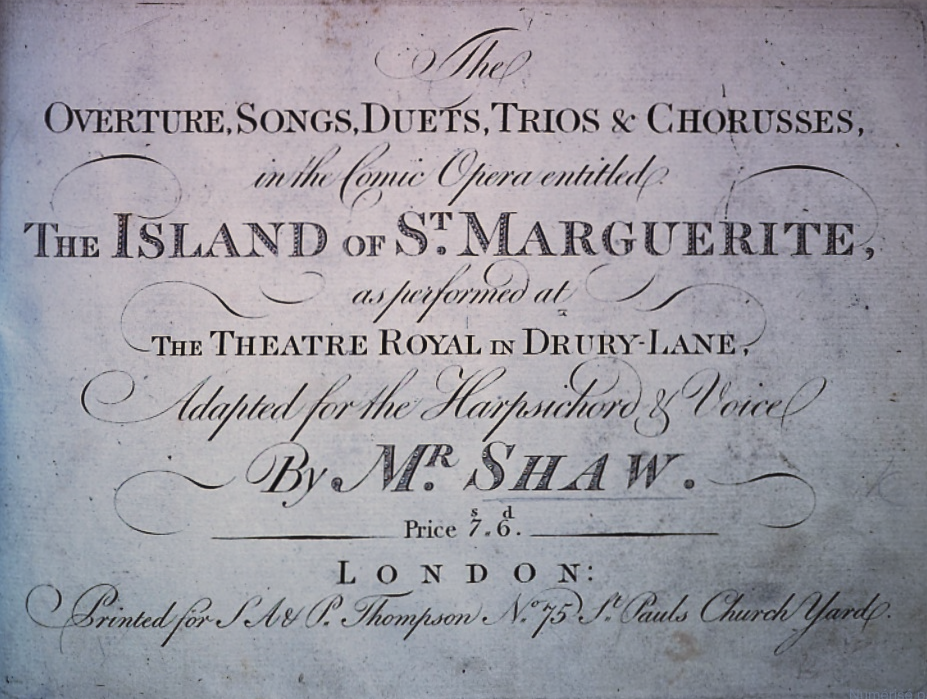
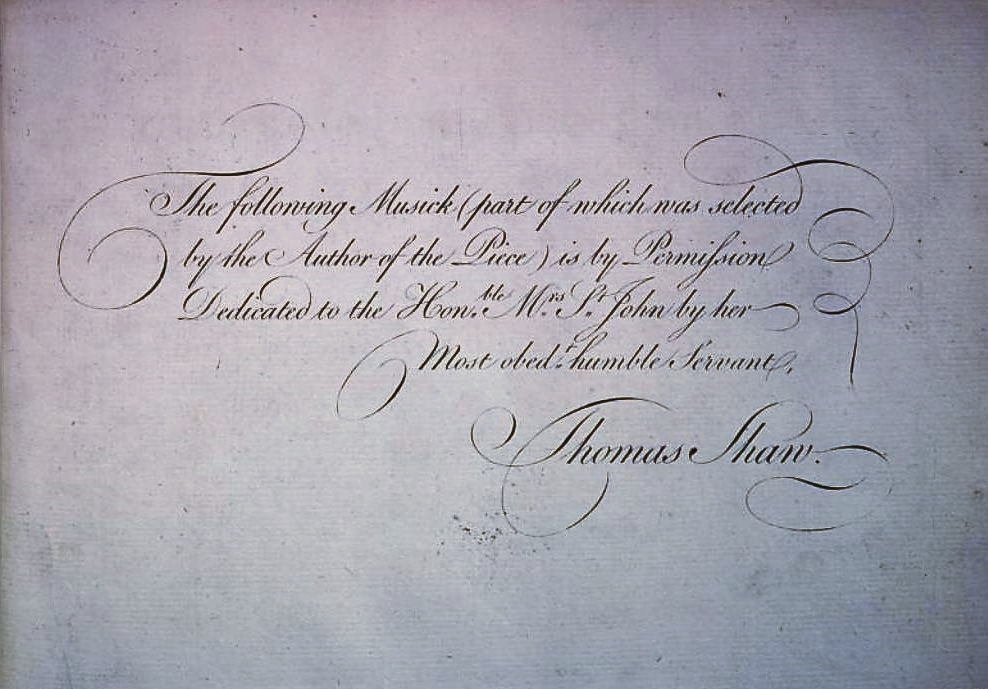
Vocal score of Thomas Shaw 's The Island of Saint Marguerite (S.A.&P.Thompson, London, 1789.): Cover page and dedication.

The various events that constitute the French Revolution, from the fall of the Bastille to the imprisonment and subsequent execution of the royal couple, as well as the contemporary Anglo-French wars, were a source of both dread and fascination in Britain, and, as such, inspired musical responses by British composers. Shaw's and John St John's The Island of Saint Marguerite (aka The Island of St Marguerite or The Island of Marguerite ) may have been one of the first such works as it premiered on 13 November 1789, barely four months after the storming of the Bastille which is the event that inspired it.

According to musicologist Mary Térey-Smith, Shaw's opera was meant to be called "The Iron Mask" in reference to the Bastille prison (the famous mysterious prisoner died there in 1703), but "the Lord Chamberlain's Office objected to the political content." However, as explained in the review of the show's premiere by the European Magazine and London Review of December 1789, much more than the originally intended title was changed and indeed all references to the recent events in France were censored and removed from the piece:

This perſormance, we are told, was originally deſigned for a repreſentation oſ the aſſault and deſtruction oſ the Baſtile, with which was blended the ſtory of the Iron Maſk; but when it came beſore the Licencer, every part oſ the piece that bore immediate reſemblance to the late popular events in Paris, was from political conſiderations forbidden, and therefore is unavoidably brought forward a maimed and mutilated ſtate.

In response to the censorship the authors seem to have resorted to selecting a less obvious, if not less known, reference to French prisons and to the Prisoner in the Iron Mask and fixed their choice on Sainte-Marguerite whose Fort Royal was one of the State prisons where the very man was held prisoner from 1687 to 1698 before being transferred to the Bastille. Not much, if anything at all, remained of the original idea as is shown by the synopsis written by the European Magazine and London Review. And the review concludes by stating:

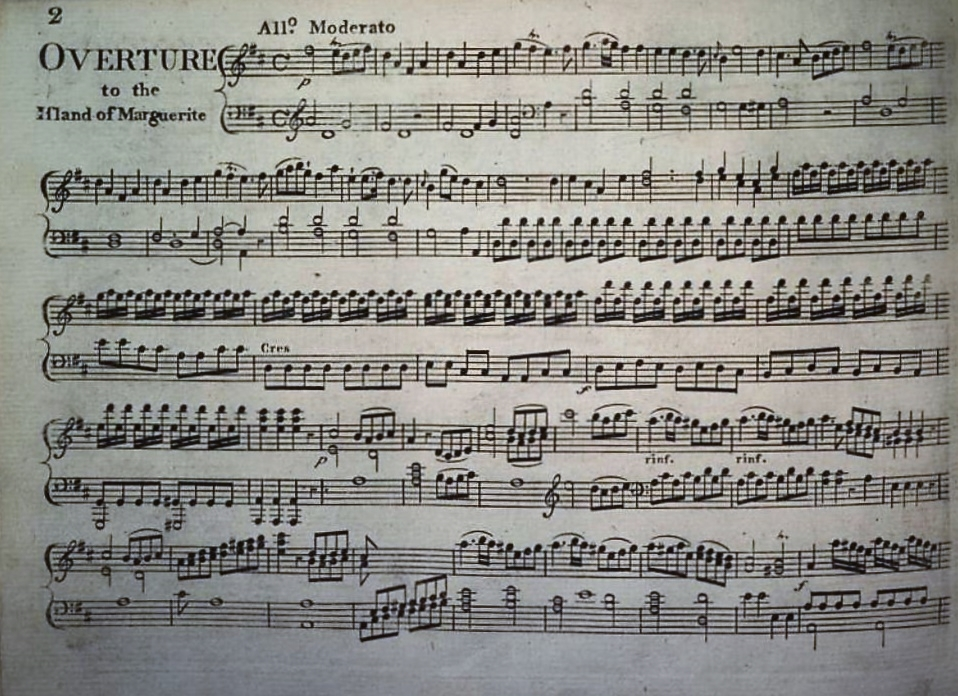
The first page of the Overture to The Island of Saint Marguerite, composed by Thomas Shaw.

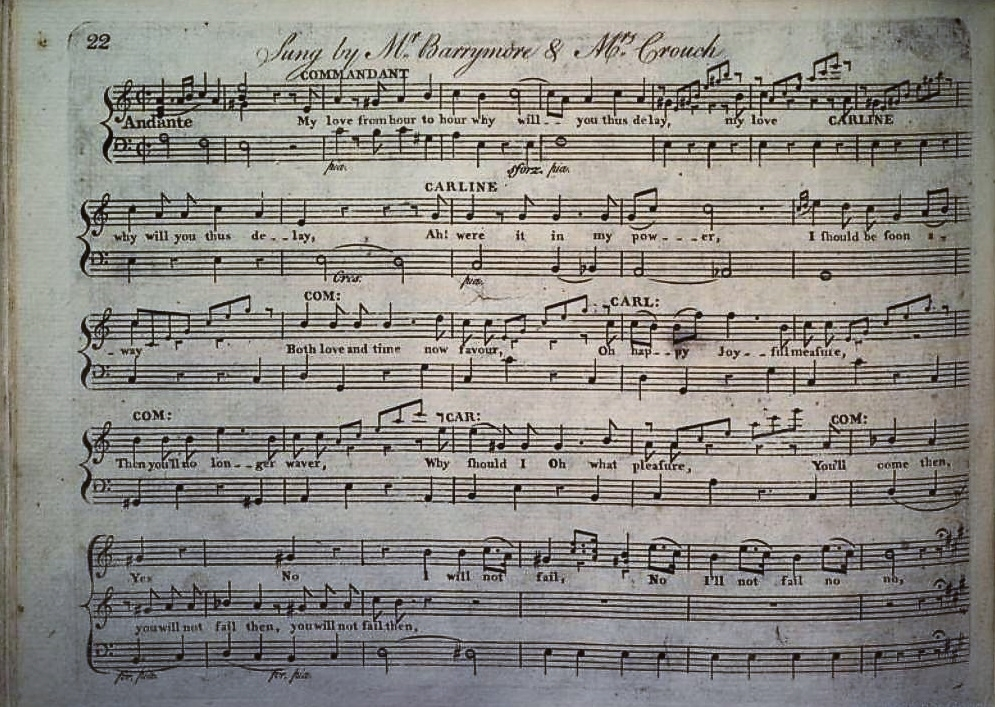
"My love, from hour to hour", duet between the Commandant and Carline (Act I, finale) borrowed from Mozart's Le Nozze di Figaro ("Crudel! perché finora", duet between the Count and Susanna, Act III). Page 1.(Vocal score of T. Shaw's The Island of Saint Marguerite, S.A.&P.Thompson, London, 1789)

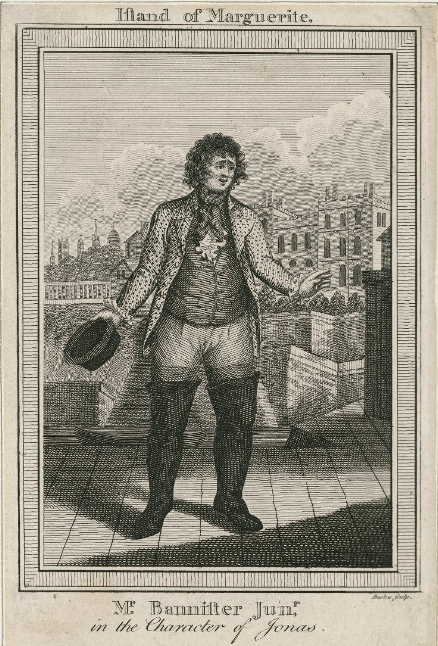
Bannister junior as Jonas in The Island of Saint Marguerite. c. 1789 (I. Barlow)

All therefore that can be ſaid of the preſent performance is, that the ſcenery is beautitul, the actors did juſtice to their parts, and the muſic is well ſelected.

Part of the music (including the overture, some arias, duets and choruses) was composed by Shaw himself. However, in his dedication inside the published vocal score of 1789, Shaw advises that the librettist St John actually selected some other pieces of music, which probably include the opening chorus "Welcome all who sigh with Truth" whose music is borrowed from Geminiani and the Act I finale ("My love, from hour to hour", duet between the Commandant and Carline) borrowed from Mozart's Le nozze di Figaro (Act III opening duet "Crudel! perché finora" between the Count and Susanna). The latter, according to Robert Fiske, had just been published in London.

The European Magazine and London Review published a synopsis:

The ſtory of this Opera is as follows: Carline, a beautiful young lady, having experienced misfortunes, determines in diſguſt to enter a Convent; but being ſoon tired of that life reſolves on an eſcape, which ſhe has hopes to accompliſh by means of the Commandant, who had bribed his way into the Convent on amorous purpoſes. The priſon, over which the Commandant preſides, contains a young man, who, to prevent diſcovery, is concealed by an iron malk. This young man, in hopes of effecting his delivery, writes his name on a ſilver plate, and throws it into the moat that ſurrounds his priſon. Jonas, a fiſherman, finds the plate, and being ſeen by the Turnkey is immediately ſecured, and doomed to the torture. The Commandant however, hearing that nobody had ſeen the plate but the fiſherman, and that he could not read, orders his releaſe, particularly on finding that he ſells fiſh to the Nuns, and consequently can aſſiſt him in his views upon Carline. The fiſherman, who is in love with Nannette, a ſervant in the Convent, procures a ladder, intending to accompany the Commandant into the houſe; but while he is singing, the Commandant enters, and takes the ladder in with him. It had been determined between the Commandant and Carline, that ſhe ſhould aſſume the male attire, under which ſhe eſcapes. After her delivery, hearing the Commandant mention his priſoner, her curioſity is excited, and ſhe prevails on the Commandant to let her ſee the unhappy captive. An interview takes place between Carline and the Priſoner, who proves her own brother. The Commandant, on finding his priſoner was diſcovered, orders him and Carline to cloſe confinement; but at this time the people of the town, underſtanding that the priſoner was of Royal birth, determined to ſet him free, which, after a conteſt with the Commandant and his ſoldiers, they effect, and the piece concludes.

Original cast of November 1789
Role	Singer/Actor
Mask (i.e. the prisoner in the iron mask)	Michael Kelly
Commandant	Mr Barrymore
Turnkey	Mr Suett
Lawyer	Mr Waldron
Officer	Mr Sedgewick
Thomas	Mr Banks
Jonas	Mr Bannister jun.
Carline	Anna Maria Crouch
Nannette	Miss Romanzini (aka Maria Bland)
Abbess	Mrs Eliza Edwards
Teresa	Mrs Fox
Nuns	Miss Hagley, Miss Stageldoir, Miss Barnes
Mob	Mr Hollingsworth, Mr Jones, Mr Phillimore, Mr Maddocks, Mr Lyons, Mr Fairbrother, Mr Webb
Extras	Mr Fawcett, Mr Wilson, Mr Alfred, Mr Danby, Mr Shaw, Mr Vincent, Mr Boyer, Mr Stageldoir, Mr Horsfall, Mr Dorion, Mr Capon. Mrs Edwin, Miss Palmer, Mrs Shaw, Mrs Davies, Mrs Butler, Mrs Gawdry
Narrator	Mr Bannister Jun.

The piece must have had some success as it was at the Drury Lane during 3 seasons and had a total of 38 performances (12 in 1789, 20 in 1790, 4 in 1791, and finally 2 in 1793).

== Financial difficulties ==
The Drury Lane books show that, as of January 1802, Shaw was to be paid £8 a week (about £350 in today's money) in addition to which he would receive money for his compositions. Three years later his wages had increased to £10 weekly (about £440 in today's money).

Shockingly in September 1807 his salary had been almost halved to £6 a week. In truth, it did not make a great deal of difference because Sheridan, who was manager of the Drury Lane, never paid Shaw in full whatever he was due. And, even though Shaw had acquired a small share of Drury Lane at the beginning of the 1795–96 season, he ended being in serious financial difficulties at the beginning 1798 solely because Sheridan kept failing to pay him.

Though Sheridan had promised to "settle Shaw's business" in a letter to Richard Peake, he obviously did not keep his word as, at some point, Shaw was arrested for his debts. Ten years later, in July 1808, Shaw was still owed £7983.00 by Sheridan, equivalent to over £360,000.00 in today's money.

When the Drury Lane theatre burned down in 1809, Sheridan, who had still not settled his debt with Shaw, was financially ruined. To deal with the theatre's complex debts (Shaw was in fact one of the many claimants against the management of the Drury Lane Theatre), Sheridan turned to politician Samuel Whitbread. Whitbread would head the company's management, deal with the theatre's debts and oversee the rebuilding.

In May 1810, Sheridan, maybe seeking investors or trying to lure Shaw back, offered him a £3000 share in the proprietorship of Drury Lane, in addition to the renter's share of £500 Shaw already own, advising him that he "could do well" with it.

A year later, in May 1811, Sheridan was still promising Shaw to pay half of his debt to him "in a fortnight", even though Sheridan was now without resources as Shaw later found out through Samuel Whitbread who had obtained Sheridan's resignation from the Drury Lane management. As the new head of Drury Lane's management, Whitbread offered Shaw to pay him £1000 outright for his £3000 share, £12 10s per annum for his £500 share as well as 5s on the pound for the arrears in salary. This settlement offer was refused by Shaw in his letter dated 15 July 1811.

Four years later, in 1815, Shaw and Sheridan were still in bitter conflict; Shaw was a "hostile witness against Sheridan and Sheridan's income from the fruit office at Drury Lane". This affair is the last trace there is of Shaw in London.

== Later life and career ==
In March 1811, George Colman, who had taken over the management of the Little Theatre in the Hay from his father and bought the theatre, offered Shaw the post of "President of the Orchestra", adding that his responsibilities in this role would need clarification since there had been misunderstandings in the past. There is no evidence that Shaw accepted the offer.

In the Autumn of 1811, Shaw applied for the post of leader of the band at the Lyceum Theatre in Wellington Street off the Strand but was unsuccessful. Writing to Samuel Whitbread in October 1811, he expresses how he feels that "[...] Calumnies [...are being] spread abroad against [his] Name and Character [...]". Without naming them openly in his letter, Shaw directly accuses Thomas Sheridan (son of the Sheridan manager of Drury Lane referred to earlier in this article) and Samuel James Arnold who were both involved in the Lyceum's management at the time.

In 1816, he returned to the Vauxhall Gardens, employed as leader.

It is unclear why Shaw eventually left England between the end of 1816 and 1817, though, amongst other things, he might have gone to flee his debtors.

In 1817, Shaw is in Paris where he composes and publishes the Anthem "Heavenly choir, assist our strain" played at the funeral service given on 16 November 1817 at the Eglise de l'Oratoire Saint-Honoré ou du Louvre, upon request of the British citizens living in Paris, for the memory for Princess Charlotte of Wales who had died 10 days earlier giving birth to a still born son. The title of the piece in its published version of 1817 leaves no doubt about the identity of its composer ("composed by Thomas Shaw, late Leader of the Band at the Theatre Royal Drury Lane and Vauxhall.") or the place where it was performed (in the Church of the Oratoire, Rue St-Honoré à Paris).

A few years later, a young Fanny Kemp, who had been sent to school in Paris, found him teaching music there in the 1820s. Her witness account is the last record there is of Shaw.

== Death ==
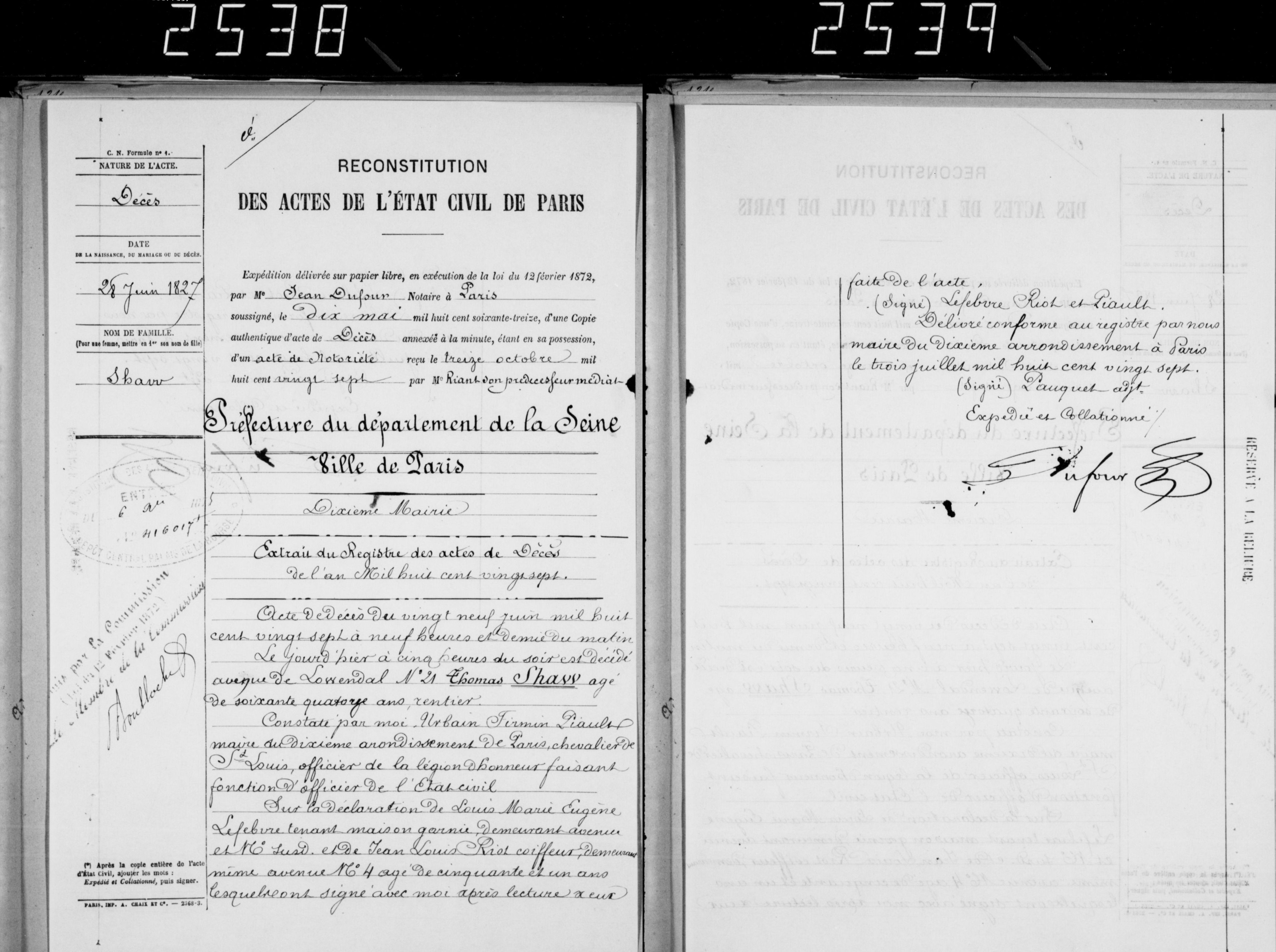
Death certificate of a certain Thomas Shaw, who died in Paris on 28 June 1827, at 74 years old.

Based on his last location and his age, most agree with the high probability that Shaw died in Paris around 1830.

Unfortunately the civil records of Paris were destroyed during the Commune in May 1871. Two thirds of the civil records dating prior to 1860 are completely lost. The remaining third is made of painstakingly reconstructed documents, but most of those are lacking information paramount in successfully identifying the individuals mentioned in them.

There is a death registration among the reconstructed civil records of the Paris archives:

The act is backdated to 29 June 1827 and states that on the previous day (28 June 1827) at 5 pm, at number 21 avenue de Lowendal, died a 74 year old individual named Shaw. His activity, indicated as "rentier".

The date of birth of Shaw (musician and composer) is unknown but is estimated to be around 1752, which would have made him about 74 or 75 years old in June 1827, depending on the month of his birth. This makes him a candidate for being the Thomas Shaw in the Paris Archives death certificate mentioned above.

The only additional information the death certificate gives us about the individual is that he was a "rentier". However, "rentier" was a rather unprecise term that encompassed about everyone who lived off money that did not come from wages per se but who may have owned some property or received some sort of annuity (from very modest pensioners to big freeholders). Because we know next to nothing about Shaw's life and state of affairs after he left England (he could well have kept shares in Drury Lane, Margate, etc., and received money for them), the additional information of "rentier" neither validates nor invalidates the hypothesis that the Paris death certificate might be our Thomas Shaw's.

Because of the state of the Paris civil records dating prior to 1860, there does not seem to be other surviving documents regarding the Shaw mentioned in the death certificate.

== Private life ==
=== Reported 1786 death ===
In their edition of July–December 1786, The European Magazine and London Review erroneously list in their obituaries "Mr. Thomas Shaw, muſician at Drury-Lane Theatre" as deceased on 16 October 1786. A namesake may have passed away on that day and may have been identified as or assumed to be the composer by mistake.

=== Haydn ===
In his second London notebook, Haydn recounts his visit for lunch at Shaw's on 17 September 1791. It seems Shaw would have been quite a fan of Haydn, welcoming him directly at the door wearing a coat with the name Haydn "worked into the very ends of both his collars in the finest steel beads". Haydn adds that Shaw's wife and his two daughters wore headpieces with his name embroidered in gold. He remembers how, to have a souvenir from him, Shaw asked for his tobacco box in exchange for his, and how a few days later the said box had been put in a silver case engraved with "Ex dono Celeberrimi Josephi Haydn" ("gift from the most famous Joseph Haydn"). Finally Haydn writes that, as a souvenir, he received a stick-pin from Mrs Shaw who he deemed to be "the most beautiful woman [he] ever saw".

=== Margate ===
Upon the death of his brother Anthony in August 1792, Shaw received an eighth interest in the Margate theatre. According to Cecil Price, his association with it continued until 1813.

== Works ==
=== Instrumental music ===
Violin Concerto in G Major (published in London c.1785 as "A Violin Concerto in Nine parts")

=== Chamber music ===
Six Favourite Minuets (published by Thomas Whitehead in Bath, 1774)
String Trio in g minor (c.1805)
Solo for flute op.12 (1819)

=== Music for keyboard ===
Three Sonatas for the Harpsichord or the Piano Forte, 1787
3 Keyboard Sonatas, 1790
3 Pianoforte Sonatas op.9 (c.1803-04)
3 Pianoforte Sonatas op.13 (1805–14)

=== Stage works ===
The Island of St Marguerite (1789)

Two-act afterpiece comic opera. Libretto by John St. John and Sheridan. Music by Thomas Shaw, with some borrowed from Geminiani and Mozart.

Cymon (1792)

Libretto by David Garrick. Original music by Michael Arne, but with new overture and additional music by Stephen Storace, Thomas Shaw, Charles Dibdin, "and other Eminent Masters." Shaw wrote the overture and some instrumental interludes, including the Marches in the Procession.

The Merchant of Venice (1792–9)

Duet In Vows of Everlasting Truth (Lorenzo & Jessica) composed by Thomas Shaw.

THE MERCHANT OF VENICE as 16 Dec. 1796, but omitted: Gobbo, Leo- Saturday 11 nardo, Balthazar, Pietro, Stephano. Also A FRIEND IN NEED. As 9 Feb. SINGING. In Act III of mainpiece a new Duett (composed by Shaw;) [In rows of everlasting truth (BUC, 942)] by Dignum and Mrs Bland; In afterpiece, as 10 Feb

The Mariners (1793)

Music principally composed by Thomas Attwood, with selections from Mozart, Martin y Soler, Ferrari, Linley Sen., Dittersdorf. Thomas Shaw composed the overture

The Chimney Corner (1797) Songs composed by Kelly. Overture composed by Thomas Shaw.
The Stranger (1798–1799)

Libretto by John Grubb,1798. Thomas Shaw's music includes the songs: To Welcome Mirth and Harmless Glee and I Have a Silent Sorrow Here (full authorship of the music to this last song is disputed as it is likely to be an adaptation of a melody attributed to Georgiana Cavendish)

Cambro-Britons (1798)

The end of the 2nd act borrows the song I Have a Silent Sorrow Here, originally from The Stranger.

The Shipwreck (1798)

This work borrows the song There Stood Jonas, originally from The Island of St Marguerite.

De Montfort (1800):

Libretto by John Philip Kemble, adapted from Joanna Baillie's play. Epilogue by Georgiana Cavendish. The music to the 3rd act composed by Thomas Shaw and the music to the 2nd and 4th acts composed by Kelly.

other pasticcios:
- Love and Magic
- Pizzaro (c.1799): Libretto by Sheridan. Music by Kelly, Thomas Shaw, Sacchini, Cherubini
- The Camp
- Emily

=== Songs ===
The Happy Milkmaid (1775)
The Four Saints (1801)

=== Sacred music ===
"Heavenly choir, assist our strain", An Anthem on the lamented Death of Her Royal Highness, The Princess Charlotte of Wales. As performed at the Funeral Service in the Church of the Oratoire, Rue St-Honoré à Paris.The words by W. H. Ireland, and composed by Thomas Shaw, late Leader of the Band at the Theatre Royal Drury Lane and Vauxhall. London, 1817.

== Discography ==
The overture to The Island of St. Marguerite is available on:

Great Britain Triumphant! Stefanie True, Caroline Schiller, Zoltán Megyesi, Mária Zádori, Reid Spencer. Capella Savaria, Mary Térey-Smith. (Centaur Records, CRC3073, 2011).

The Violin Concerto in G is available on:

English Classical Violin Concertos, Elizabeth Wallfisch, The Parley of Instruments, Peter Holman (Helios, CDH55260, 2008)

== Sources ==
- Fiske, Roger; James, Kenneth E. (2001). "Shaw, Thomas". New Grove Dictionary. Oxford University Press. ISBN 0-333-73432-7 and ISBN 1-56159-228-5
- Highfill, Philip H.; Burnim, Kalman A.; Langhans, Edward A. (1973). A Biographical Dictionary of Actors, Actresses, Musicians, Dancers, Managers & Other Stage Personnel in London, 1660–1800. Vol. 13. SIU Press. pp. 294–298.
- English operas : [bound volume of 18th. century selections, Sacred Harmonic Society catalogue number 815.] / Arne; Arnold; Bates; Shaw. London: Longman & Broderip. 1798. pp. 197–200. Royal College of Music Library: D1391/6.
- British Newspaper Archives
- The London Stage Database
- European Magazine and London Review
- Archives de Paris
- Kelly, Michael (1968). Reminiscences of Michael Kelly of the King's theatre and Theatre Royal Drury Lane. New York, Da Capo Press.
- Woodfield, Ian (1977). The Celebrated Quarrel between Thomas Linley (Senior) and William Herschel: an Episode in the Musical Life of 18th-Century Bath. Bath: University of Bath Music Monographs.
- Whitbread, Samuel. "Samuel Whitbread correspondence concerning the Drury Lane Theatre". Harvard College Library and Houghton Library.
- Price, Cecil J. L. (1966). The Letters of Richard Brinsley Sheridan. Oxford: Clarendon Press.
- Pasquin, Anthony (1796). The pin-basket, to the children of Thespis. A satire. London.
- Shaw, Thomas (1789). The Overture, Songs, Duets, Trios & Choruses in the Comic Opera entitled The Island of St Marguerite, [the words written and the music partly selected by the Hon. J. St. John] ... adapted for the Harpsichord & Voice by Mr. Shaw. London: S. A.&P. Thompson. The British Library: Music Collections DRT Digital Store D.282.(8.).
- New Grove Dictionary of Music and Musicians, 2nd ed. (2001)
