= Anthony Shaw (violinist) =

English violinist of the second half of the 18th century

- Born: 1747 probably Bath, Somerset, England
- Died: 26 August 1792 (aged 45); Margate, Kent, England
- Resting place: St John's, Margate
- Occupation: Violinist
- Spouse: Rachael Collier (m. 1768)
- Parent(s): Thomas Shaw (father, 1715-92, Contrabassist)
- Relatives: Thomas Shaw (brother, 1752-1827, violinist, violist, clarinettist, composer)

Anthony Shaw was born in 1747, probably in Bath, and died aged 45 on 26 August 1792 in Margate. He was a violinist and was the band leader at the Covent Garden Theatre until his death. Anthony Shaw was the son of Bathonian musician Thomas Shaw (1715–92) and was the older brother of the composer Thomas Shaw.

== Early life ==
There is virtually no information about Anthony Shaw's early life and his career prior to going to London. Through elements of his brother's biography, we know that he was the son of a musician born in 1715 called Thomas Shaw who was a double-bass player active in Bath and London for many years as a leading string player and concert director, including in music festivals in Westminster and at Covent Garden, and who had become a member of the Royal Society of Musicians in 1754. Anthony's father was a "superannuated musician" according to the European Magazine and London Review when he died in Bath in 1792.

By 1768, Anthony was already living in London; indeed he is likely to be the Anthony Shaw, a Saint-Augustine parish resident, marrying Rachael Collier, a spinster of the same parish, on 30 May 1768.

== Career in London ==
The first known fact about Anthony's career is that he played first violin at the Commemoration of Handel (Handel Memorial Concerts at Westminster Abbey and the Pantheon from 26 May to 5 June 1784) for which a total of 493 performers were gathered together.

By this time, however, he must have already been well established as a musician as he became a member of The Royal Society of Musicians about 7 years earlier in 1776 or 1777.

By 1788, he had joined and become the leader of the band at Covent Garden, whilst his brother, Thomas Shaw, held the same post at the rival Drury Lane theatre.

Anthony Shaw was in charge of selecting the music of the instrumental interludes inserted in William Shield's and John O'Keeffe's pasticcio afterpiece Aladin, or the Wonderful Lamp which premiered on 26 December 1788 at Covent Garden.

In November 1790, Anthony lived at 10 Bow Street in London, at a short walking distance (in fact just across the road) from his working place: the Theatre Royal at Covent Garden.

He is known to have played in the oratorio concert at the King's Theatre on 24 February 1792.

In October 1792 the pasticcio afterpiece Harlequin Chaplet with "music selected [by Shaw] from Pepusch, Dr Arne, Arnold, Fischer, Michael Arne, Vincent, Dibdin, Reeve, and Shield" was produced at Covent Garden. Although there is no details about who this "Shaw" was, it is plausible that Anthony could have put the piece together and that it was produced after his death. It is less likely that his brother Thomas was involved as he was then officially employed by the Drury Lane theatre, Covent Garden's direct competitor.)

== Margate ==
During the Georgian era, the town of Margate (also known by its parish name "St. John's") was transformed from a small fishing village into one of the first sea-side resorts. The Kentish Gazette of 31 August 1792 thus comments the sea bathing season:

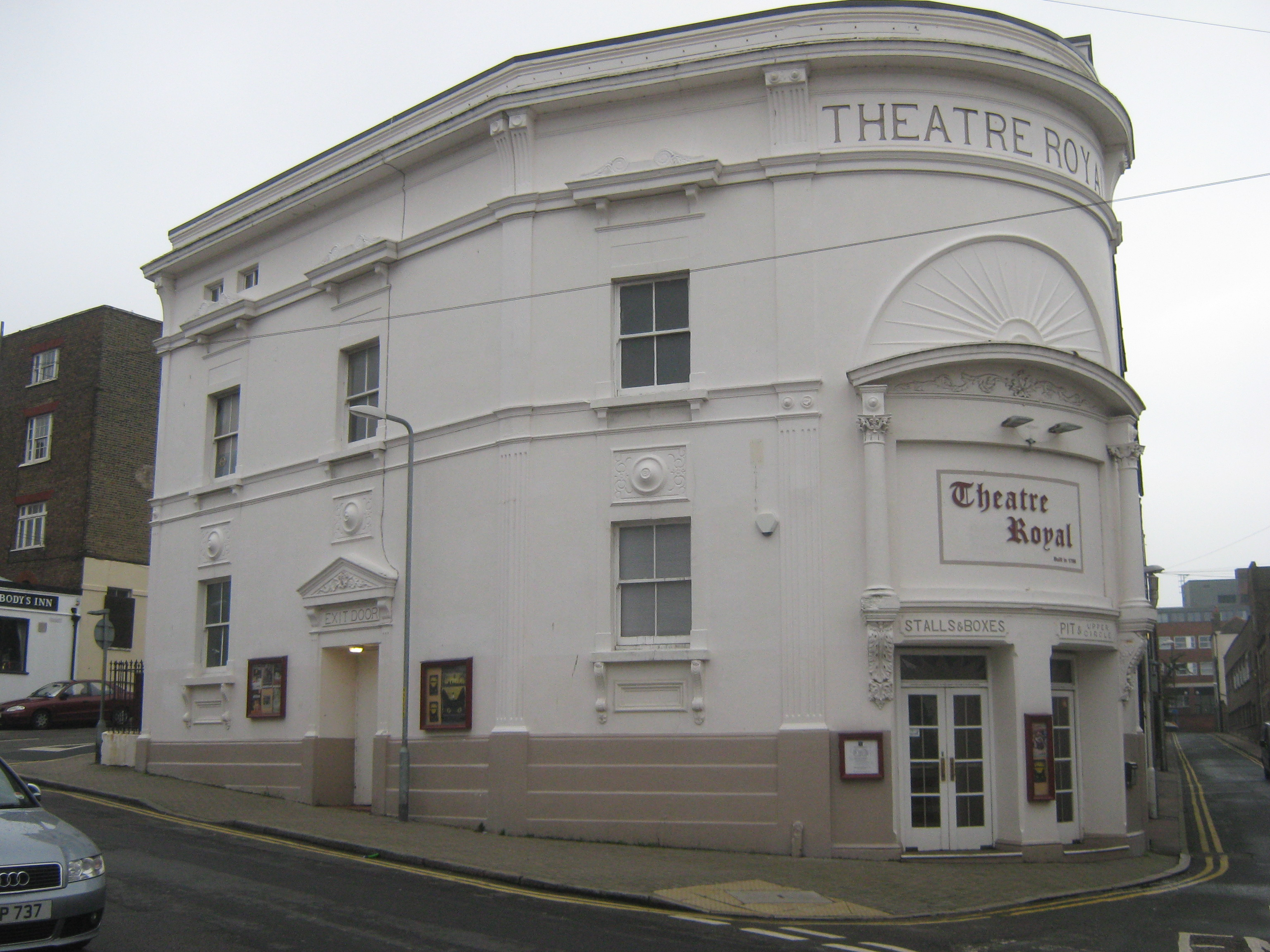
Theatre Royal, Margate. Built in 1787, it underwent a radical remodelling both inside and out in 1874.

Margate is now much crouded - within this laſt fortnight the ingreſs has been, on an average, upwards of two hundred people every day - more than 500 people were at Dandelyon laſt Wednesday to breakfaſt.

The "Margate hoys", though not without risks, provided cheap and ready access from London. These were the early days of sea bathing, and, among other things, visitors could rely on hotels, assembly rooms, and a theatre for their entertainment.

In the early 1790s, Anthony became the orchestra's superintendent at the Theatre Royal of Margate. The latter had only just been built three years earlier in 1787 on one of the town's most fashionable squares. In the late 1780s-early 1790s, Anthony had received an eighth interest in the Margate theatre. (Upon his death, this share in the Theatre Royal of Margate will go to his brother, the composer Thomas Shaw.) At the time of his passing in 1792 Anthony was still the band leader at Coven Garden during the season, but would also work at Margate during the summers.

== Death ==
The Manchester Chronicle reports that Anthony Shaw died on 26 August 1792 in Margate and was buried there at St. John's on 29 August 1792. On Friday 31 August 1792, the Kentish Gazette thus reported his death:

On Sunday laſt died ſuddenly at Margate, Mr. Shaw, of the Covent Garden Band, where he led the orcheſtra this ſeaſon; a man of reſpectable musical abilities, and private worth.

His passing left his widow Rachael in dire straights with an annual income of £14 a year (about £1075 in today's money). Two months after her husband's passing, she was granted an additional monthly income of about £2 (about £179 in today's money) by the Royal Society of Musicians.

== Sources ==
- Highfill, Philip H.; Burnim, Kalman A.; Langhans, Edward A. (1973). A Biographical Dictionary of Actors, Actresses, Musicians, Dancers, Managers & Other Stage Personnel in London, 1660-1800. Vol. 13. SIU Press. pp. 294–298.
- Lee, Anthony (2012) Margate in the Georgian Era. Droit House Press.
- [Aladin.] The Pantomime of Aladin, or the Wonderful Lamp ... the poetry by J. O'Keefe ... the music selected from the works of Handel, Giordini, Gluck, Carolan, & Shield, by Mr. A. Shaw, the songs by W: Shield. <Overture composed and adapted by B. I. Richardson.>. London: G. Goulding. 1788. The British Library: Music Collections H.115.c.
- European Magazine and London Review.
- British Newspaper Archive
