= Lavinia Edwards =

Transgender actress in the 1800s

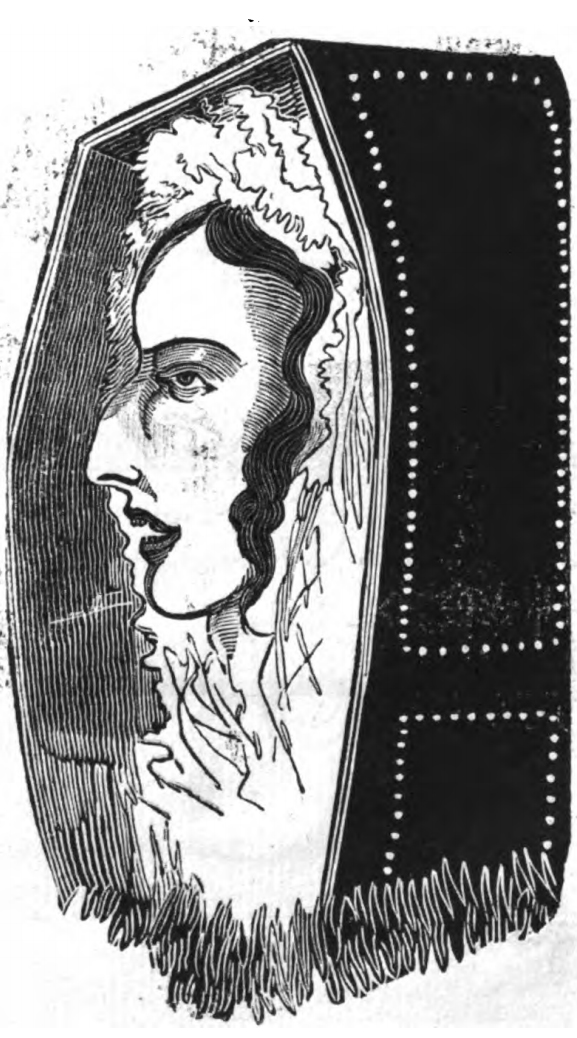
- Edwards after death
- Born: Dublin
- Died: London
- Other name: Eliza Edwards
- Occupation: Actress

Lavinia Edwards (died 1833, also known as Eliza Edwards or Miss Walstein) was an Irish actress. She largely played in tragedies, and shortly into her career, became homeless. She died at age 24 of lung inflammation. When her body was dissected, she was determined to have been born male. An engraving published in 1815, however, had already depicted a mature "Miss Walstein" in the act of reading. These must be two distinct personalities, or her age was wrongly determined.

== Life ==
Little is known about Edwards' life, other than the fact that she lived for some time in Dublin, and later in London. While she had at one time had success as an actress—playing primarily figures in tragedy—she eventually became homeless.

She lived with a woman named Maria, who claimed that she was Edwards' sister. During this period of homelessness, Maria said Edwards was supported financially "by different gentlemen". These included Thomas Smith (who offered her protection), Thomas Grimstead (who supported Edwards, and received an ultimatum by his father to no longer talk to her, which he accepted), and a "Frederick" (who was a client of her prostitution). She had, at times, passed for both a man and a woman, though (according to one newspaper account) her being a woman was never doubted while she acted.

== Death ==
Five minutes after informing Maria that she had trouble breathing, Edwards reportedly said "Maria, I am dying—it has pleased God to call me", and died of lung inflammation.

In 1832, a year before Edwards died, the United Kingdom passed the Anatomy Act 1832, formulated by Jeremy Bentham, which granted doctors the right to inspect corpses which were not claimed. The act was passed after a series of grave robberies, caused by a low supply of bodies. Because nobody had claimed Edwards' body following her death, her corpse was taken away for dissection, where her sex was ascertained as male. This information was previously unknown: Despite previous medical examinations, only the autopsy indicated her birth sex.

Described as a "perfect man" by a newspaper account at the time, Edwards had no facial hair, an "effeminate appearance" according to one report, and long, feminine hair. Her doctor said her voice was "cracked ... not unlike a female". The coroner's jury was so surprised by the state of her body that they wondered whether she had been substituted with another. The inspection of her corpse showed that her stomach was in perfect condition, dispelling any rumors that she had been poisoned prior to death. Her liver, however, showed significant signs of impairment due to heavy alcohol consumption, and the poor condition of her lungs precipitated her death.

Maria claimed that she was not aware that Edwards had been assigned male at birth when they lived together. After the death of Edwards, Maria was suspected to be carrying her child. Maria insisted her daughter was fathered by a man named George Treherne, but it was generally accepted—despite Maria being a prostitute, and thus having several other men that could have been the father—that the girl was Edwards'.

Alfred Swaine Taylor, the main dissector of Edwards' body, later became one of the leading experts on medicine and the law and wrote extensively of her. He first began writing about Edwards as an example of someone whose sex was concealed, but later wrote that because "the aperture of [her] anus was much wider and larger than natural" and her "male organs had been drawn up and secured", Edwards was addicted to sodomy.

With her case becoming well known to the public, similarities were drawn between Edwards and others whose gender expression did not align with their sex. For instance, one newspaper compared the case of Edwards to that of Mary Hamilton (also known as Charles or George) in 1833, who had assumed the identity of a man and married fourteen wives. Hamilton was publicly lashed and imprisoned for a term of six months.
