= Russell J. Donnelly =

Canadian-American physicist (1930–2015)

Russell James Donnelly
- Born: April 16, 1930; Hamilton, Ontario, Canada
- Died: June 13, 2015 (aged 85); Eugene, Oregon
- Education: McMaster University, Yale University
- Spouse: Marian Donnelly
- Scientific career
- Fields: Physicist
- Workplaces: University of Chicago, University of Oregon
- Doctoral advisor: C. T. Lane and Lars Onsager

Russell James Donnelly (born 16 April 1930 in Hamilton, Ontario, died 13 June 2015 in Eugene, Oregon) was a Canadian-American physicist known for his work on classical and quantum fluid dynamics. He connected the fields of low temperature physics and fluid turbulence.

== Life ==
Donnelly graduated from McMaster University with a bachelor's degree in 1951 and a master's degree in 1952. In 1956 he received his doctorate from Yale University, with a thesis entitled "On the hydrodynamics of liquid helium". His doctoral advisers were the noted physicists C. T. Lane and Lars Onsager. His PhD work demonstrated that the oscillations of liquid helium in a U-tube at a low temperature could be described by two-phase liquid theory.

In 1956 he became an instructor and later professor at the James Franck Institute at the University of Chicago, where he worked with S. Chandrasekhar and Dave Fultz. From 1959 - 1963 he was Sloan Fellow. In 1966 he moved to the University of Oregon, where it was possible for both himself and his wife, art historian Marian Donnelly, to hold positions. He eventually served twice as department chair at the University of Oregon. In 1972 he worked at the Niels Bohr Institute in Copenhagen. He was also a visiting professor at the University of California, Santa Barbara and the University of Birmingham. He was a consultant at NASA and the Jet Propulsion Laboratory.

During his life he advised 25 PhD students, and mentored many others, including future Nobel prize winner David Lee. He died from pneumonia on 13 June 2015 in Eugene, Oregon.

== Honors ==
- 2002, Fritz London Memorial Prize, International Union of Pure and Applied Physics
- 2001, Fellow of the American Academy of Arts and Sciences
- 2001, Fellow of the American Association for the Advancement of Science
- 1999, Honorary doctorate, McMaster University
- 1996, Lars Onsager Medal, Norwegian University of Science and Technology
- 1975, Otto Laporte Award, Division of Fluid Dynamics, American Physical Society
- 1963, Fellow of the American Physical Society (APS)
- Fellow of the Institute of Physics
