= James Brook =

English cricketer

James William Brook (1 February 1897 – 3 March 1989) was an English first-class cricketer, who played one match for Yorkshire against Glamorgan at Bramall Lane, Sheffield in 1923.

Born in Ossett, Yorkshire, England, Brook was a right-handed batsman, he scored a duck in his only innings, and did not bowl his right arm medium pace. Yorkshire won by an innings. He played for Yorkshire Second XI from 1921 to 1924, and for the Yorkshire Council in 1920. Brook played for his home town side for many years.

Brook died at the age of 92, in March 1989 in Selby, Yorkshire.
