= Boardsport =

Sports that are played with a board as primary equipment

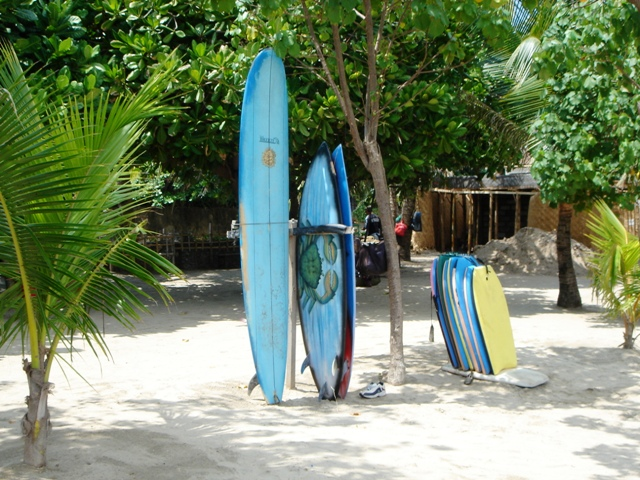
Surfing is the "grandfather" of all board sports, originating from Polynesian culture

Boardsports are active outdoor sports that are played with any sort of board as the primary equipment. These sports take place on a variety of terrains, from paved flat-ground and snow-covered hills to water and air. Most boardsports are considered action sports or extreme sports, and thus often appeal to youth. Some board sports were marginalized in the past. However, many board sports are gaining mainstream recognition, and with this recognition, they have gotten wider broadcasting, sponsorship and inclusion in institutional sporting events, including the Olympic Games.

Surfing is the first known boardsport, originating from Polynesian culture. Skateboarding was then invented by surfers looking to "surf" on land. It is hard to estimate when most boardsports were invented because people have been making homemade versions throughout history. For example, it is not hard to conceive of a person, who is familiar with the concept of skiing or sledding, standing sideways on a plank of wood and riding down a snow-covered slope. M.J. "Jack" Burchett is credited with first doing this in 1929, using horse reins and clothesline to secure his feet on the plank of wood. Most boardsports have similar, equally unknown origins.

Using data collected in the past decade, it is estimated there are 18-50 million skateboarders, 5-25 million surfers, and 10-20 million snowboarders in the world. Approximately 100 million people participate in boardsports worldwide.

== Classifications ==
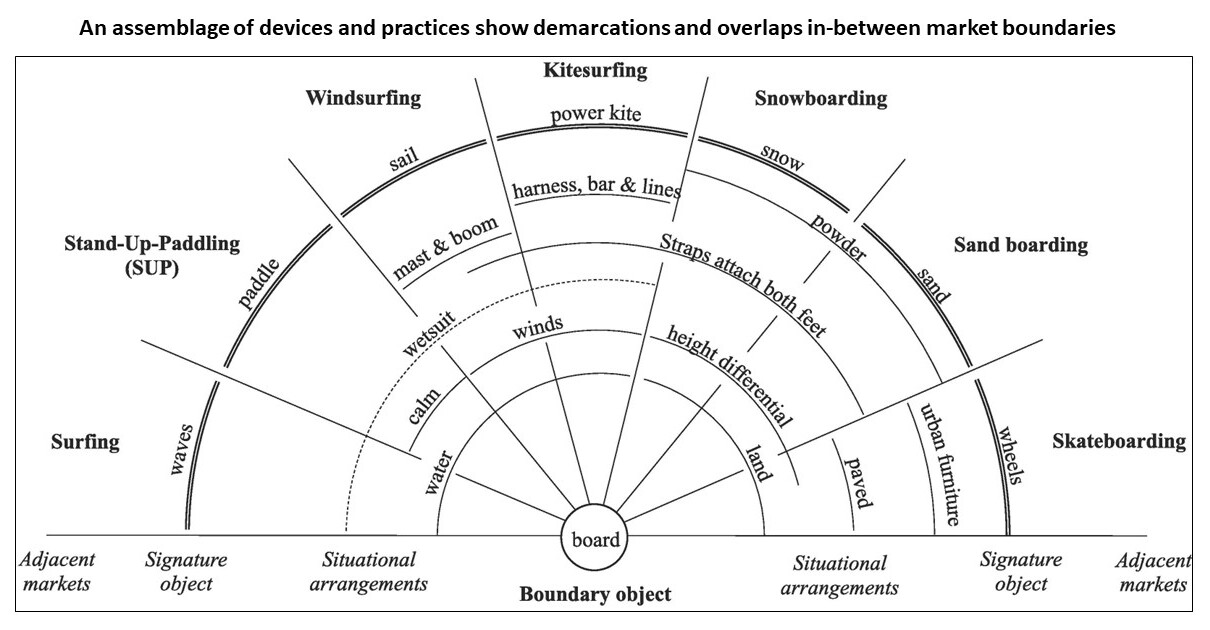
A diagram illustrating adjacent board sport practices

Various board sports are characterized by terrain: surf, snow, wake, and skate are the primary ones.

=== Water ===
Surfing
The grandfather of all board sports, surfing is a surface water sport that involves the participant being carried by a breaking wave.
Stand Up Paddle Surfing (SUP)
A variant of surfing where one always a stands up on the board and propels oneself by a one-bladed paddle, without lying down on the board. Although originally the goal was to catch and surf the waves, a racing modality has emerged with similarities to kayaking.
Skimboarding (1930s)
A discipline of surfing involving riding a board on wet sand or shallow water. A predominantly recreational activity that has evolved into a highly competitive water sport.
Windsurfing (1970)
Also known as sailboarding. A water sport involving travel over water on a small 2–4.7 metre board powered by wind acting on a single sail. The sail is connected to the board by a flexible joint
Bodyboarding (1971)
Wave riding consisting of a small, roughly rectangular piece of foam, shaped to a hydrodynamic form. The bodyboard is ridden predominantly lying down, (or 'prone'). It can also be ridden in a half-standing stance (known as 'dropknee') or can even be ridden standing up.
Kneeboarding (1973)
A discipline of surfing where the rider paddles on his belly into a wave on a kneeboard, then rides the wave face typically on both knees.
Riverboarding (1978)
A boardsport in which the participant is prone on the board with fins on his/her feet for propulsion and steering.
Wakeboarding (1983)
A surface watersport created from a combination of water skiing, snow boarding and surfing techniques. As in water skiing, the rider is towed behind a boat, or a cable skiing setup.
Skurfing (1984)
Another fast growing boardsport is skurfing a mix of surfing and more conventional water sports in which the participant is towed behind the boat.
Flowriding (1991)
Similar to surfing but done on a man-made artificial sheet wave.
Wakeskating (1990s)
A rider is pulled behind a boat on a wakeskate which is smaller than a wakeboard and has no bindings with a foam or griptape surface.
Kitesurfing (1996)
Also known as kiteboarding. Boards similar to those known from windsurfing or wakeboarding are propelled by an inflatable or foil power kite, allowing for high speeds and high jumps. Other variations are to use a wheeled board or buggy on land, or skis or a snowboard on snow.
Wakesurfing (1997)
A rider is pulled behind a boat on a mini surfboard and can ride the boat's wake with no rope.

=== Land ===
==== Paved surface ====
Skateboarding (1950)
Uses a board mounted on wheels, and often ridden on a half-pipe, in urban settings, or emptied specially built swimming pools.
Longboarding (1970s)
Similar to freeboarding but with long skateboards that come in different shapes and sizes, longboarding is mostly a racing sport but there are many other styles as well.
Snakeboard (1989)
Similar to skateboarding, but also influenced heavily by snowboarding, uses a board broken into three connected pieces that move together in order to generate momentum.
Freestyle scootering (1996)
An action sport which involves using scooters to perform freestyle tricks, in a manner similar to skateboarding and BMX freestyle.
Carveboarding
A board that has wheels similar to a car except smaller, it turns better than most boards on four wheels, its main purpose is to cruise and carve, it can turn 65 degrees, and has spring-loaded trucks that are almost as unique as a flowboards trucks.
Freeboarding
Often said to be the board whose feel is the most similar to snowboarding. There are two extra castor wheels in the middle of the base that are somewhat lower than the other four. This allows the rider to distribute his weight to only one "edge", as in snowboarding. This gives the rider the ability to slide, an ability no other land board has besides the longboard.
Caster board
Two narrow platforms known as "decks" are adjoined by a rubber or aluminium coated metal beam that houses a strong spring. Each truck has one wheel that is connected to the board in such a way that each wheel can rotate independently. Both wheels are mounted on slants that measure around 30° in angle, facing away from the front of the board. Similar to Vigorboard (2003) : Constructed from two platforms, each supported by a single caster with a single wheel giving the board a total of two wheels. the two platforms are connected by heavy metal torsion bar that enables the board to twist in the centre.
Street Skurfing
Similar to Caster board, but the rider can move both feet independently.
Freeline skates (2000's)
A pair of skates designed to give the feeling of skateboarding, snowboarding, surfing, and inline skates all in one. Freeline Skates are extremely portable, making them the smallest and lightest form of transportation. See also Street Skurfing.
Street surfing
A split deck board connected by a spring rod to allow each half of the board to twist independently from the other, each side only having 1 caster wheel, allowing for tight maneuvers and self propulsion.
On-shore boards
A type of board that has four inline wheels and four in the back (two on each side) and is deeply concave in the front.
T-boarding
A skateboard deck with two wheels that can spin 360 degrees.

==== Off-paved surface ====
Land windsurfing
A sport similar to traditional windsurfing that is performed on land rather than water. A four-wheeled deck, similar to a mountain board or skateboard deck, is commonly used in conjunction with a mast and sail in order to project the board across land.
Mountainboarding (1992)
Similar to snowboarding, but on snowless peaks (in between winter seasons). The board is wider and sturdier. Mountainboarding is similar to skateboarding in the way that mountainbiking is similar to regular biking.
Kite landboarding
Similar to Kite Surfing but the kite is used to pull the rider along flat ground (often a hard packed sandy beach) on a mountainboard

==== Snow ====
Snowboarding (1977)
A cross between skateboarding and skiing, the board medium is snow, although the condition of the snow can have a major impact on snowboarding style and technique. The four subcategories are freeride, freestyle, alpine and powder.
Snowskating (1998)
This is similar to snowboarding but there are no bindings used. Instead the snow skate has a foam grip similar to griptape, enabling you to do skateboard style tricks. There are four main types of snowskates: Single deck (a skateboard-deck-like platform made out of either wood and/or plastic; Bilevel (similar to a skate board but, instead of trucks and wheels, a small ski with metal edges called a subdeck is used with special trucks to be used on a ski hill); 4x4 (a skateboard but the wheels are replaced by very small skis); Powderskate (can either be like a Bilevel snowskate or a single deck snowskate but longer and wider).
Snowkiting
This is when a kite is used to pull a snowboarder along.

==== Sand ====
Sandboarding
A recreational activity similar to snowboarding that takes place on sand dunes rather than snow-covered hills.

=== Air ===
Skysurfing
A kind of skydiving in which the skydiver wears a board attached to their feet and performs surfing-style aerobatics during freefall.

== See also ==
- Shortboard
