= List of surface water sports =

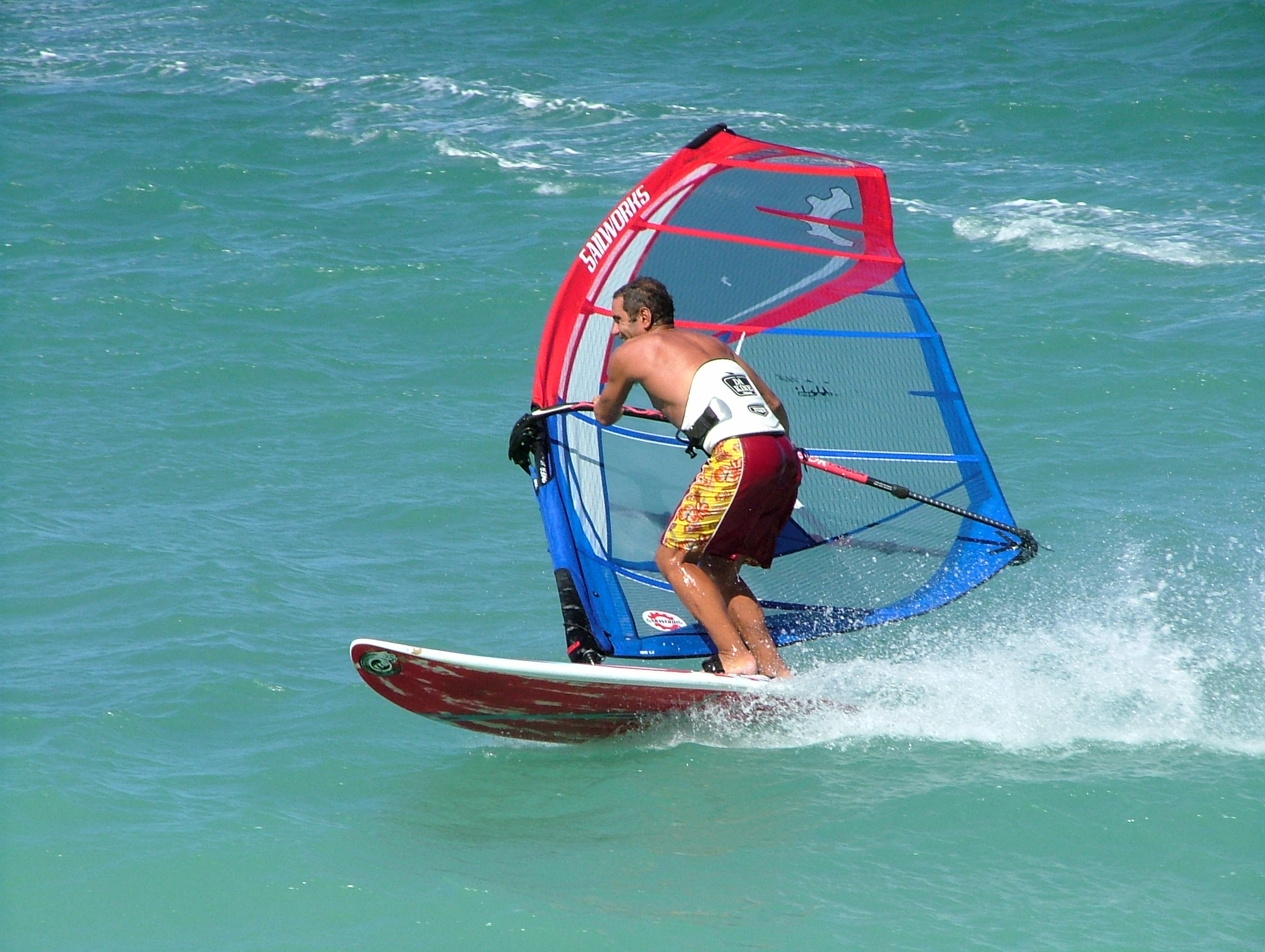
Windsurfing is a typical surface water sport.

The following is a list of surface water sports. These are sports which are performed atop a body of water.

== Boat racing ==
=== Motorized racing ===
- Hydroplane racing
- Bathtub racing

=== Rowing ===
- Canoeing
- Kayaking
- Sweep rowing
- Sculling
- Dragon boat racing

=== Sailing ===
- Yacht racing
- Hydrofoil sailing. This recent development in the high-speed sailing arena has evolved most in the International Moth class of racing dinghy. These boats have a T-shaped rudder and centreboard that generates sufficient lift to clear the hull from the water. When this happens wetted surface area drops radically and the boats accelerate up to 1.2 to 1.5 times the speed of the prevailing wind. These boats are very light (all up weight is less than 40 kg) and very fast, They hydrofoil in as little as 8 knots (15 km/h) of breeze ("sit on the deck breeze" for most dinghy classes). The top recorded speed is about 50 km/hour, and speeds of 40 km/hour are common in the class.

=== All types of propulsion ===
- Dinghy racing

== Towed water sports ==
Environmental impact includes noise, pollutants, shoreline degradation, and disturbance and dislocation of wildlife, and the governing body, the International Waterski & Wakeboard Federation (IWWF) has been acting to reduce this impact. The IWWF also governs the related sports of barefoot skiing, cable skiing, cable wakeboard, disabled ski, racing, show ski, water skiing, and wakesurfing.

=== Skurfing ===
A skurfer

Skurfing is a surface water sport in which the participant is towed on a surfboard, behind a boat, with a ski rope. It is not a professional sport and has no competitions; it is a freestyle sport with a highly individualistic style and form.

=== Tubing ===
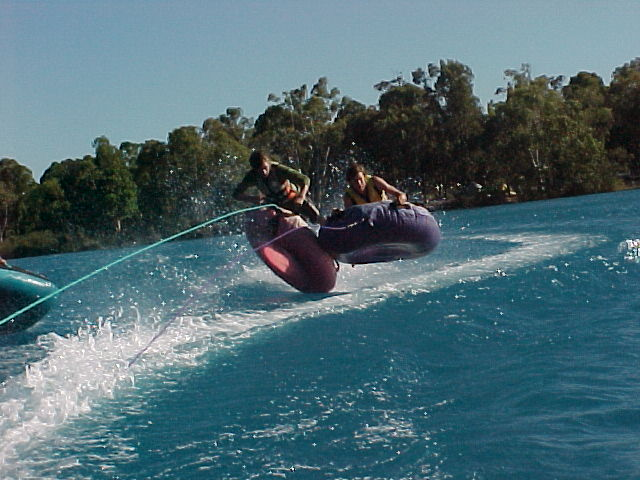
Two tubers

Tubing, also known as biscuiting, is where a large, usually circular, rubber tube is towed behind a boat at fast speeds. The general aim is to hold on as long as possible without falling off due to the boat's sharp turns; more experienced biscuiters also try to jump the boat's wake and become airborne.

=== Wake sports ===
Wake sports are sports that involves riding a wake while being towed by a motorboat, personal watercraft, close-course cable systems, ski lifts, winches or a crane, at speeds between 10 mph (wakesurfing) to 25 mph (some professional wakeboarders).

==== Kneeboarding ====
Kneeboarding is an aquatic sport where the participant is towed kneeling on a buoyant, convex, and hydrodynamically shaped board at a planing speed, most often behind a motorboat.

==== Hydrofoiling ====
A hydrofoil is towed water ski where the participant is seated on the ski. The ski consists of a seat tower and board, as well as a foil, which rides beneath the water’s surface, with front and rear wings. The participant straps into the hydrofoil ski and secures the safety straps on the seat tower and the foot bindings. After the deep water start, the skier can ski, jump, and attempt aerial tricks launching the hydrofoil off the water and off boat wake. Other variants include a wake surfboard with a foil attached to the back underneath the water. The board can move up and down out of the water based on the position of the rider’s weight. Hydrofoiling is most often done behind a motorboat or jet ski.

==== Wakeboarding ====
In wakeboarding, the participant is towed standing on a small board, riding a wake produced by the towing boat, and attempts to do tricks. Events are organized by the World Wakeboarding Association. A special wakeboard boat has a wakeboard tower, which places the pull point higher above water's surface which makes it easier to jump. Wakeboarding boats have a ballast system that pumps water into tanks to increase displacement, and enlarge the wake.

==== Wakeskating ====
Wakeskating is an adaptation of wakeboarding that employs a similar design of board manufactured from maple or fibreglass. Unlike wakeboarding, the rider is not bound to the board in any way, similar to the skateboard, from which the name derives. The rider is able to do more complicated tricks than on a wakeboard such as kick flips because of the absence of bindings.

==== Wakesurfing ====
Wakesurfing differs from other wake sports in that the boat does not tow a rider (continuously). The rider uses a tow rope to help them get up in the wake. After doing so, they drop the rope and then ride the wake as they would when surfing. The rider is also much closer to the boat than with other water sports such as wakeboarding.

=== Water skiing ===
Slalom water skiing

Water skiing is an aquatic sport and recreational activity and is popular in many countries around the world where appropriate conditions exist - an expanse of water unaffected by wave motion. Rivers, lakes, and sheltered bays are all popular for water skiing.

Standard water skis were originally made of wood but now are usually constructed out of fibreglass-based composites. They are of similar length to downhill snow skis but are somewhat wider. Instead of a rigid binding, they have rubber molded binding, in which the skier's feet are placed. Skiers are pulled along by a rope with a handle fitted at one end and attached to a powerboat at the other. There are two types of waterskiing: doubles and slalom. When skiing doubles, you use two skis. When skiing slalom, one ski is used. Slalom skiing is notably harder than doubles.

== Boardsports ==
Boardsports are sports that are played with some sort of board as the primary equipment. The following aquatic boardsports are those that are not towed behind a boat:

=== Bodyboarding ===
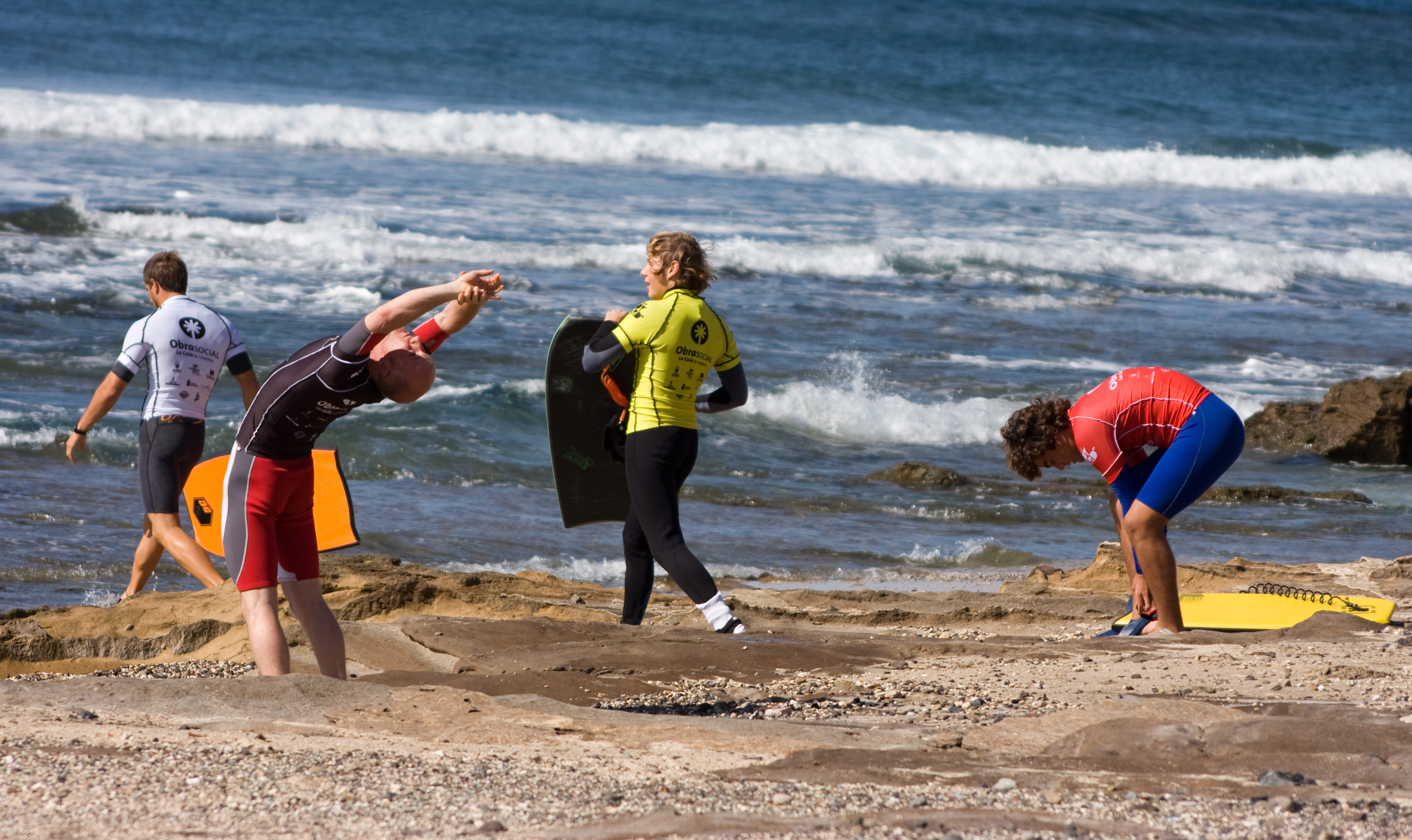
A bodyboarding competition in Las Palmas in 2010

A bodyboard is an instrument of wave riding consisting of a small roughly rectangular piece of foam, shaped to a hydrodynamic form. The bodyboard is ridden predominantly lying down, (or 'prone'). It can also be ridden in a half-standing stance (known as 'dropknee') or can even be ridden standing up.

=== Flowriding ===
Flowriding, also known as flowboarding, is a late-20th century alternative boardsport incorporating elements of surfing, bodyboarding, skateboarding, skimboarding, snowboarding and wakeboarding. Flowriding takes place on an artificial wave machine, called the FlowRider or the FlowBarrel, created by Wave Loch.

=== Kite sports ===
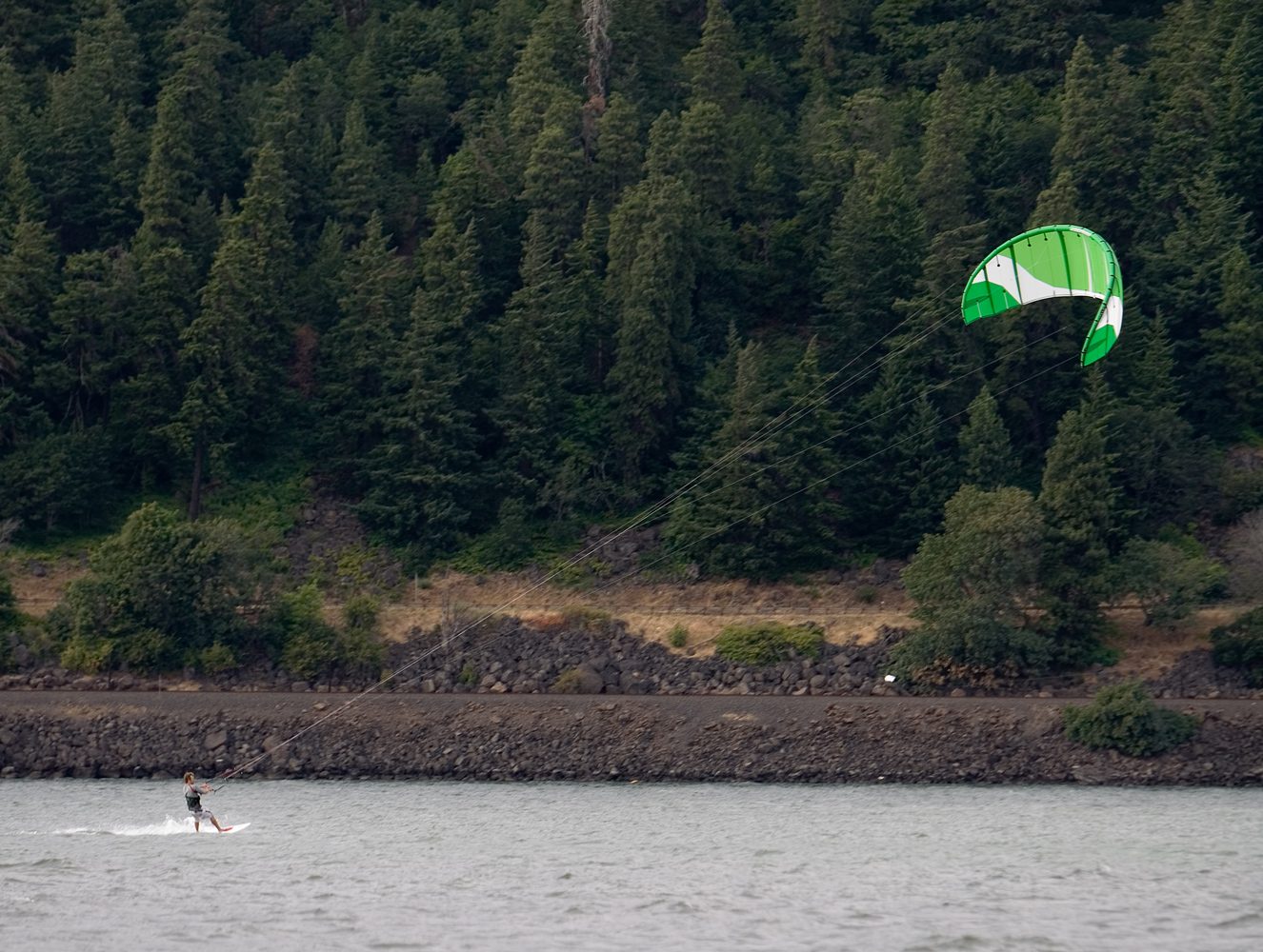
A kitesurfer in the Columbia River Gorge

==== Kiteboarding ====
Kiteboarding, also known as kitesurfing, and sometimes as flysurfing, involves using a power kite to pull a small surfboard with bindings.

=== Jetboarding ===
Jetboarding, also known as motorized surfboarding, is a type of water sport that involves riding a surfboard with electric- or petrol-powered system. Riders can achieve high speed to 70 km/h in a very short of period with a hand controller.

=== Paddleboarding ===
Paddleboarding is an activity in which a person paddles a long streamlined surfboard with their hands. This is done while laying or kneeling on the board. Paddleboards are raced throughout the world.

A standup paddle surfer off the coast of the Valencia region

==== Standup paddleboarding ====
Standup paddleboarding (SUP), also known as standup paddle surfing, is a water sport born from surfing with modern roots in Hawaii. Stand up paddle boarders stand on boards that are floating on the water, and use a paddle to propel themselves through the water.

=== Riverboarding ===
In riverboarding, also known as hydrospeed or white-water sledging, the participant lies prone on their board with fins on their feet for propulsion and steering.

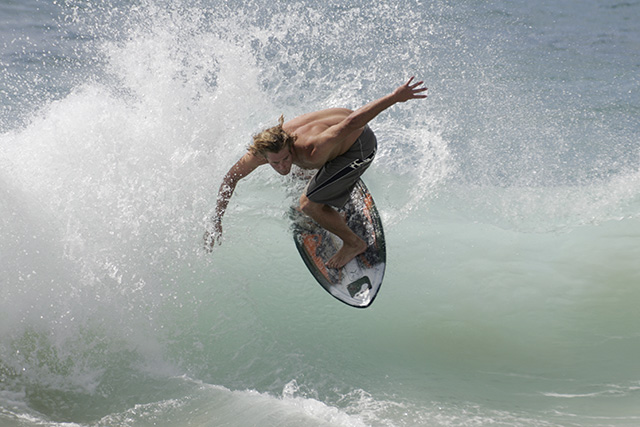
Skimboarding

=== Skimboarding ===
Skimboarding is a boardsport which involves riding a skimboard either on an outgoing wave, or in shallow water, where instead of going for waves the rider may attempt to ride a rail or do "tech" tricks.

=== Surfing ===
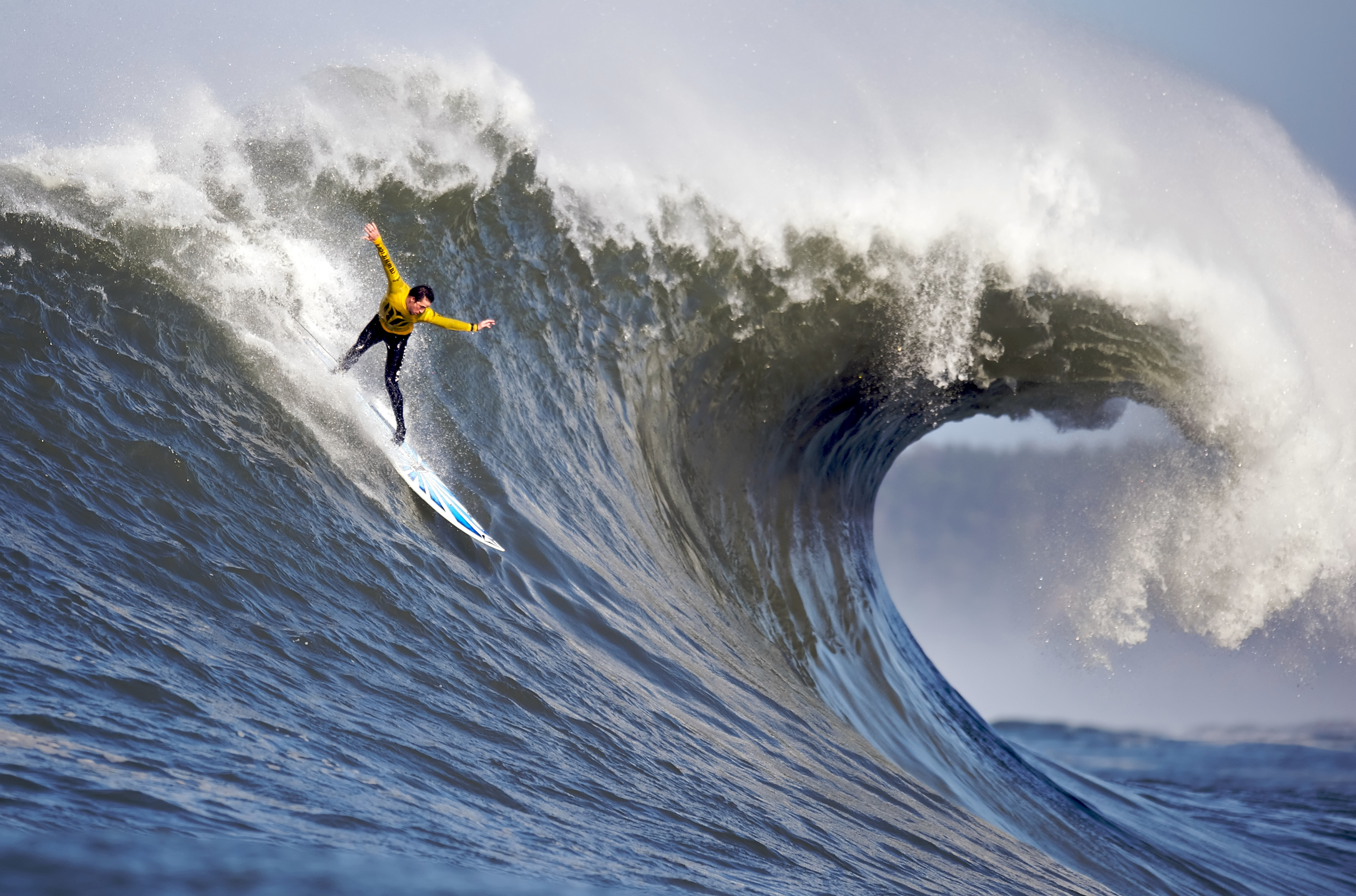
A surfer performing a late drop at a Mavericks, California surfing competition in 2010

Surfing is a recreational activity in which individuals paddle into a wave on a surfboard, jump to their feet, and are propelled across the water by the force of the wave. Surfing's appeal probably derives from an unusual confluence of elements: adrenaline, skill, and high paced maneuvering are set against a naturally unpredictable backdrop—an organic environment that is, by turns, graceful and serene, violent and formidable.

=== Windsurfing ===
Windsurfing is a sport involving travel over water on a small 2–4.7 metre board powered by wind acting on a single sail. The sail is connected to the board by a flexible joint. The sport is a hybrid between sailing and surfing. The sail board might be considered the most minimalistic version of the modern sailboat, with the major exception that steering is accomplished by the rider tilting the mast and sail or, when planing, carving the board, rather than with a rudder.

=== Wing foiling ===
Wing foiling or wingsurfing is a sport where an individual holds a lightweight wing on a surf board with a hydrofoil.

== Bodysurfing ==
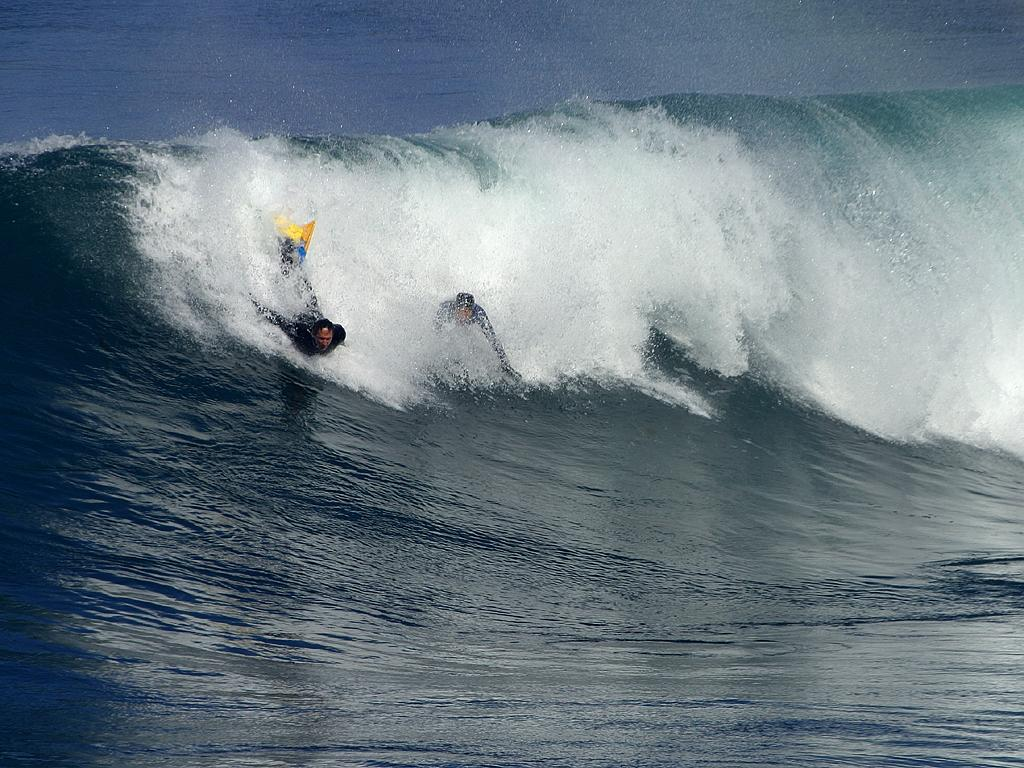
Bodysurfing in La Jolla, California

Bodysurfing is the art and sport of riding a wave without the assistance of any buoyant device such as a surfboard or bodyboard. Bodysurfers typically equip themselves only with a pair of specialized swimfins that stay on during turbulent conditions and optimize propulsion.

== See also ==
- Horse surfing
- Stone skipping
- List of water sports
