= Human-powered land vehicle =

Vehicle propelled over ground by human power

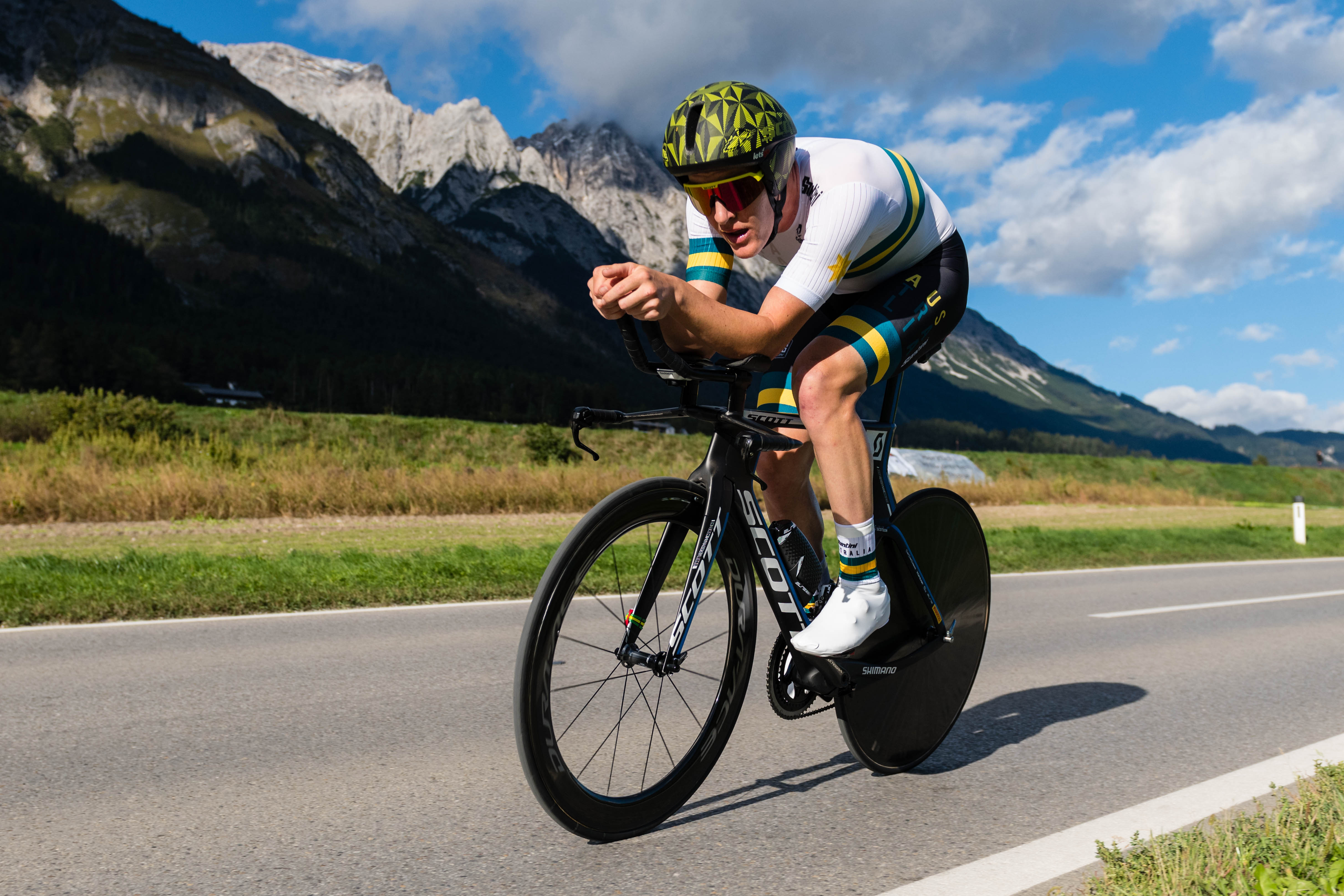
Professional cyclist Callum Scotson propelling a road bicycle

Human-powered land vehicles are land vehicles propelled over ground by human power. The main ways to support the weight of a human-powered land vehicle and its contents above the ground are rolling contact; sliding contact; intermittent contact; no contact at all as with anything carried; or some combination of the above. The main methods of using human power to propel a land vehicle are some kind of drivetrain; pushing laterally against the ground with a wheel, skate, or ski that simultaneously moves forward; by pushing against the ground directly with an appendage opposite to the direction of travel; or by propeller. Human-powered land vehicles can be propelled by persons riding in the vehicle or by persons walking or running and not supported by the vehicle.

Many human-powered land vehicles can also be gravity-powered land vehicles, and vice versa, although some of the latter are quite awkward to use as the former. These include street luges, gravity racers, and snow boards.

== Types of ground contact ==
There are four main ways to support the weight of a human-powered land vehicle and its contents: rolling contact as with wheels; sliding contact as with skates, skis, or runners; intermittent contact as with stilts; and no contact at all as with anything carried. Additionally, these four methods may be combined as in wheelbarrows.

=== Wheeled ===
The most common wheeled human-powered land vehicle is the bicycle in all its forms. Other notable examples include:

- Balance bicycles and dandy horses
- Handcars, and draisines
- Hotchkiss Bicycle Railroad and shweeb
- Inline skates, roller skates, roller skis and Roller shoe
- Kick scooters, kickbikes, knee scooters, and square scooters
- Rickshaws, prams, strollers, roller buggies and buggies/Shopping trolley (caddy)
- Skateboards, longboards, Penny boards, snakeboards, caster boards, Freeline skates, Surfskate (or Carveboard)
- Unicycles, Tricycles, quadracycles, and velomobiles
- Trikkes
- Wheelchairs
- Baby walkers
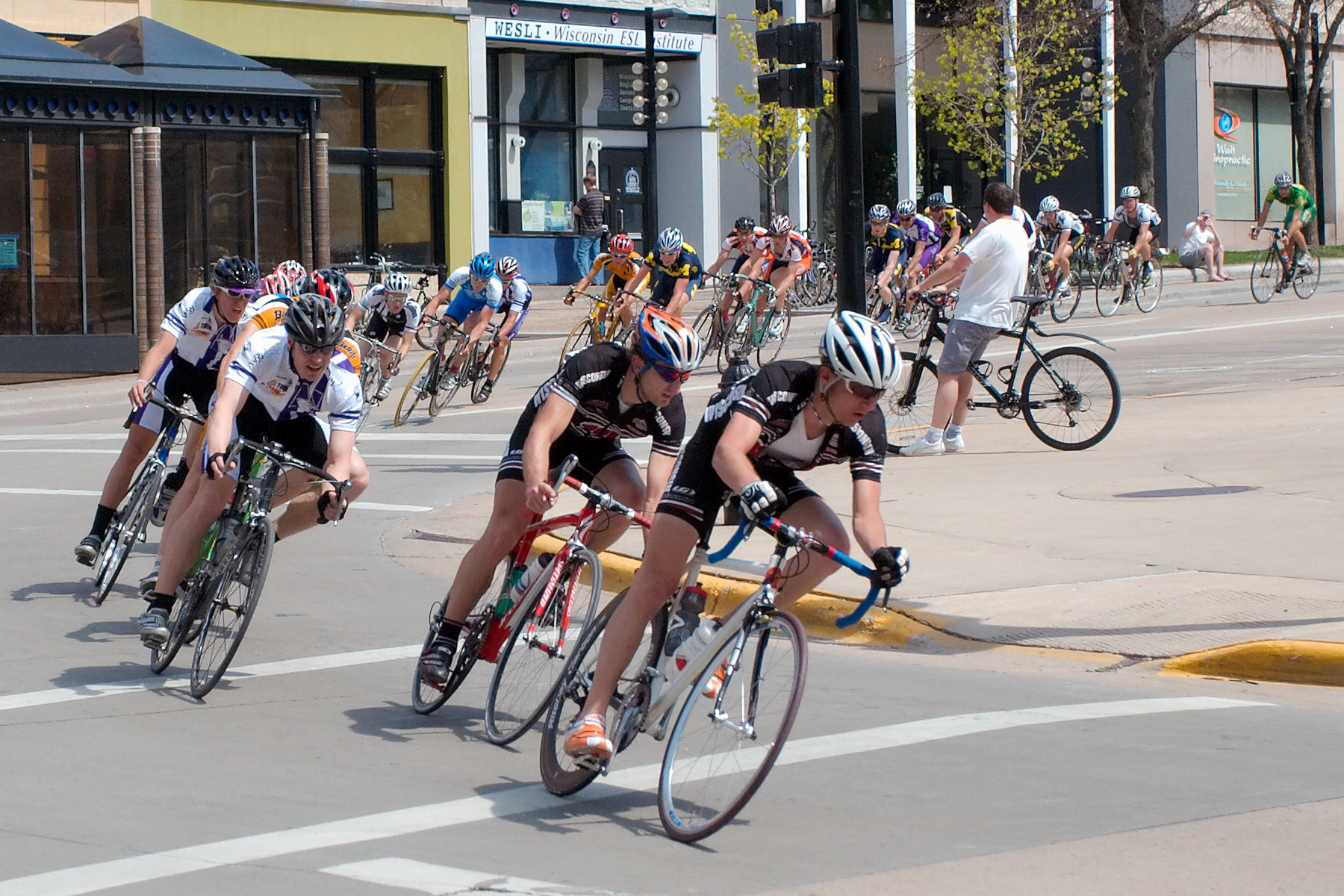
Cycling

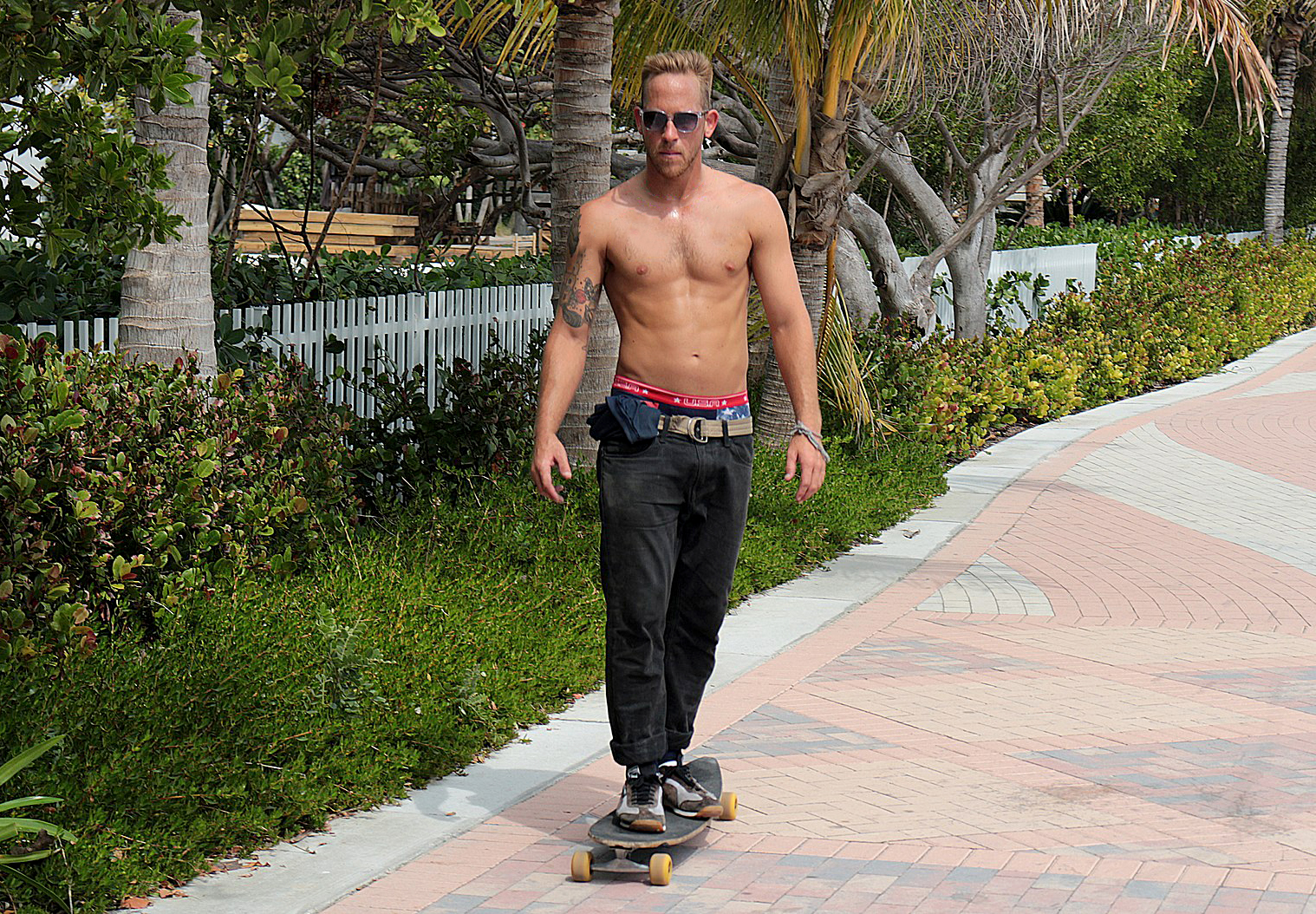
Longboarding

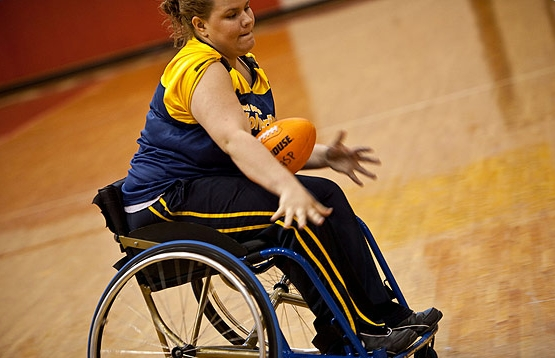
Wheelchair

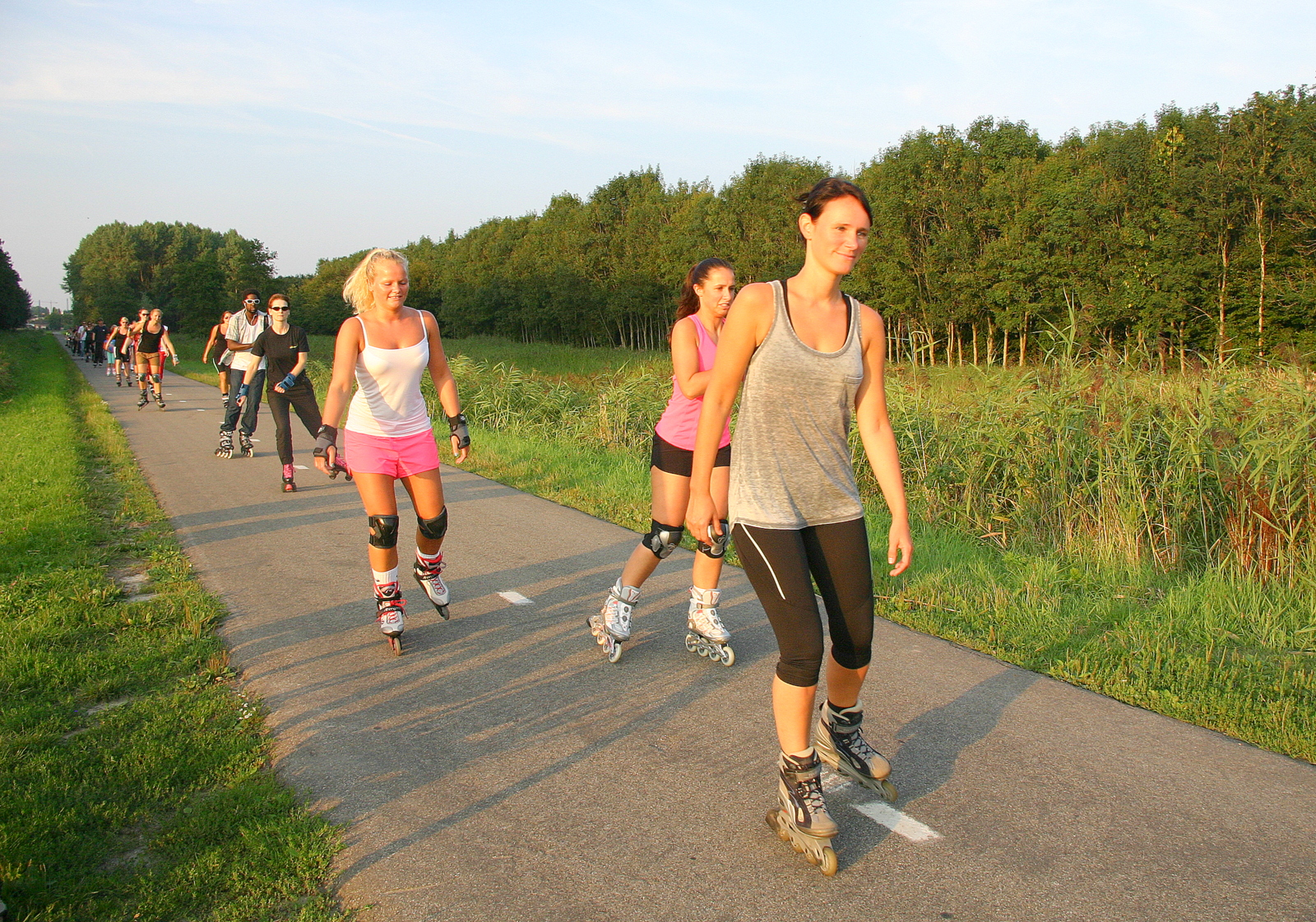
Rollerskating

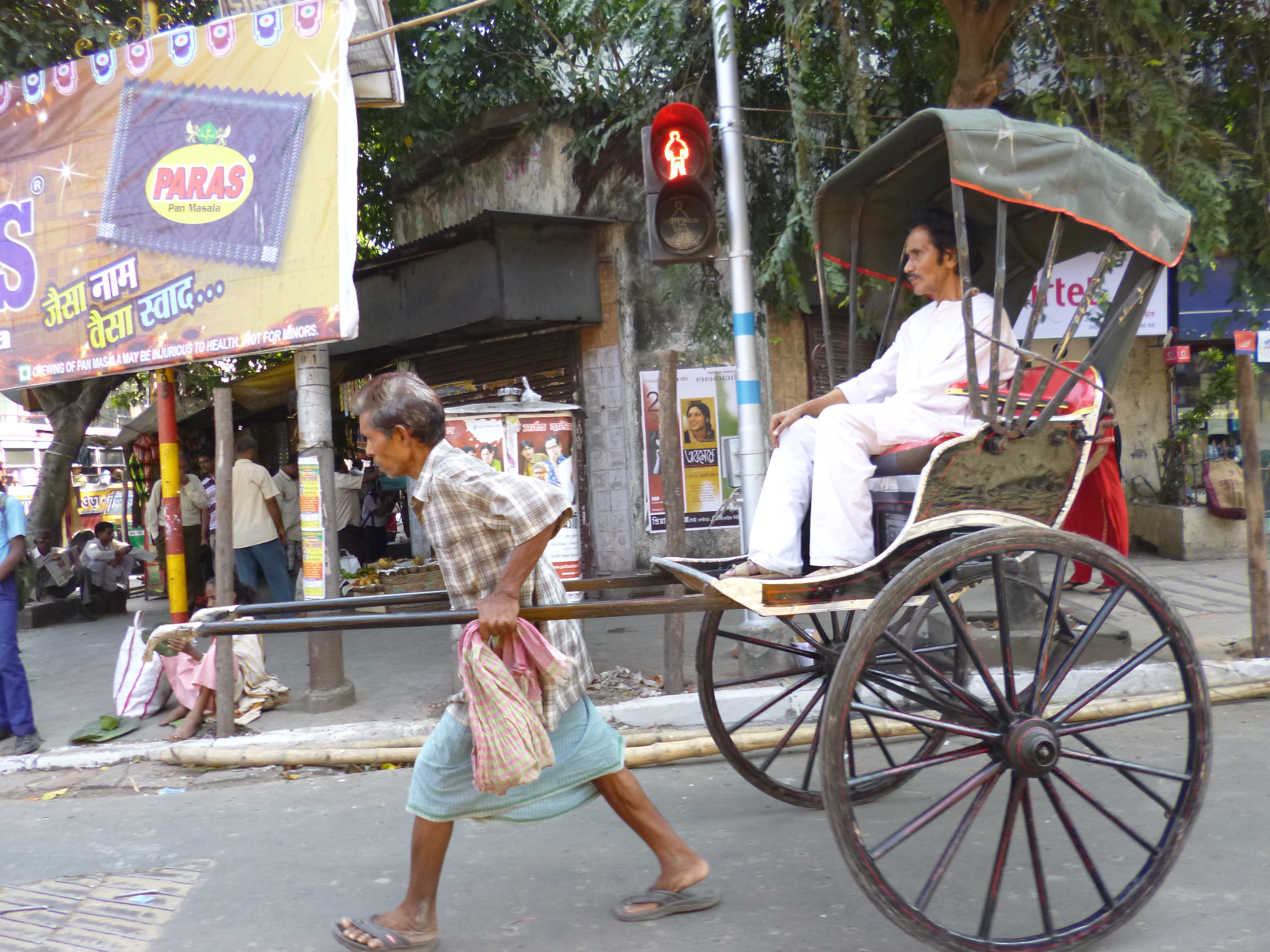
Rickshaw

=== Sliding ===
- Skis, snowboard, snowskate
- Sleds
- Ice skates and clap skates
- Mud horses and mud sledges
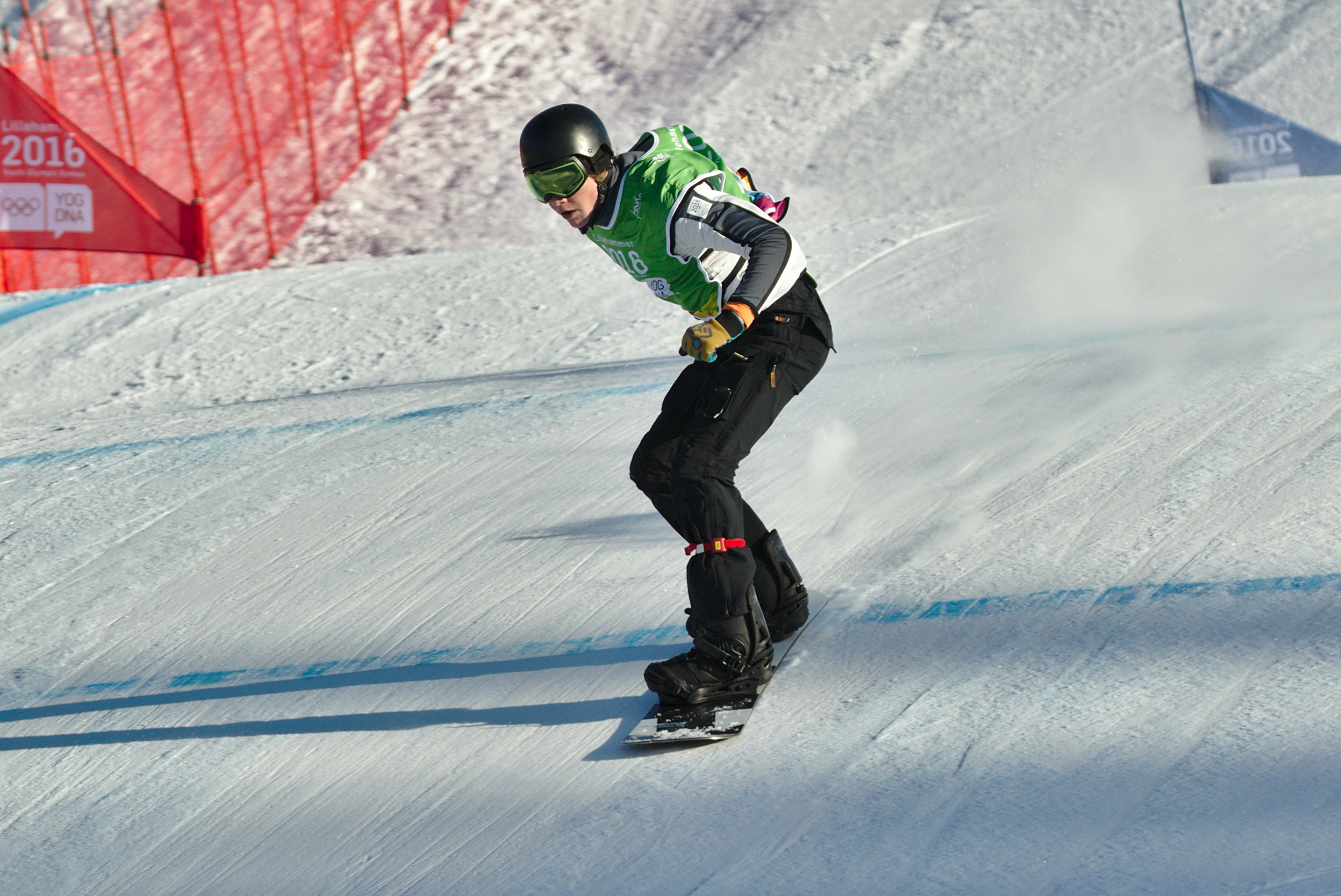
Snowboarding

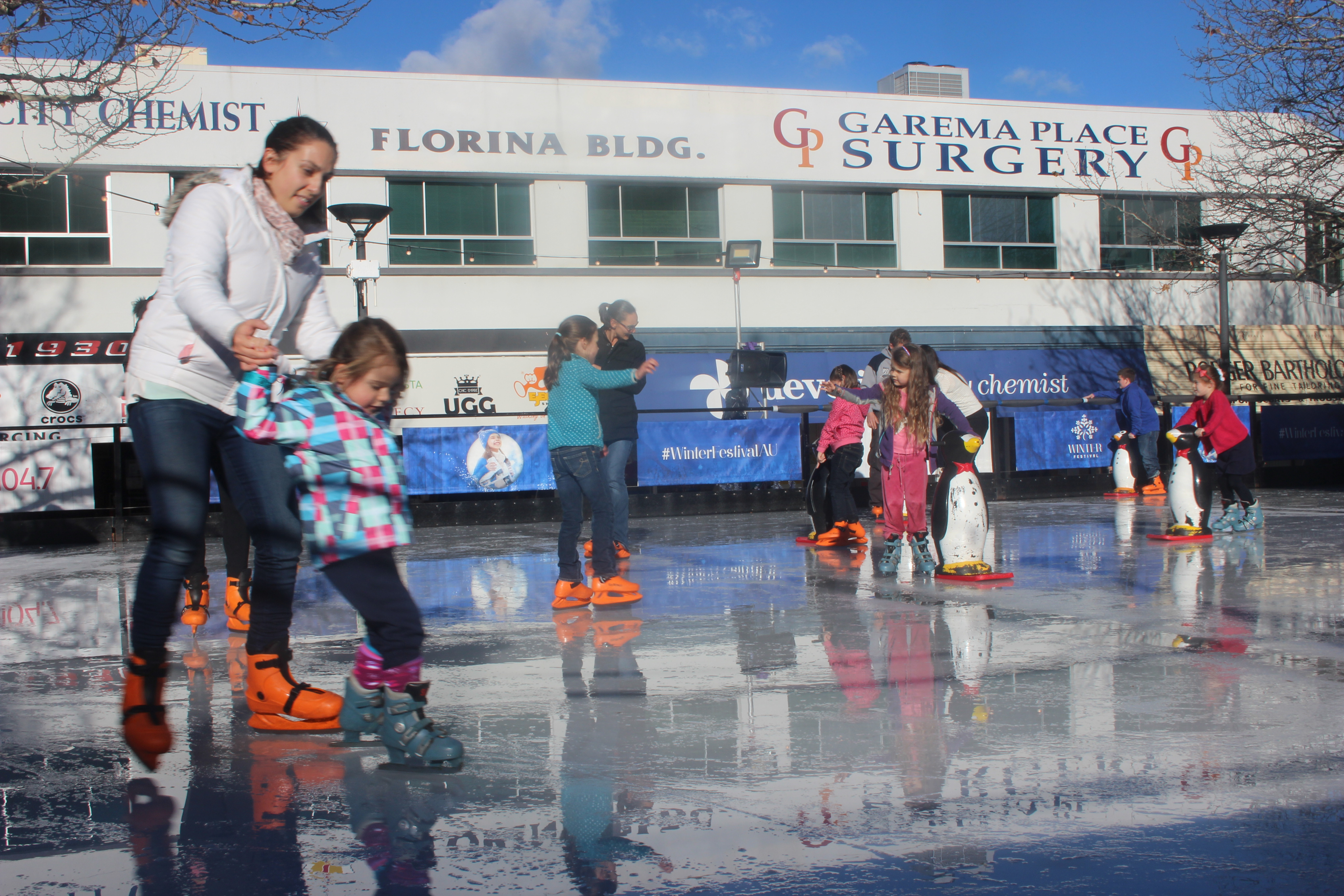
Ice skating

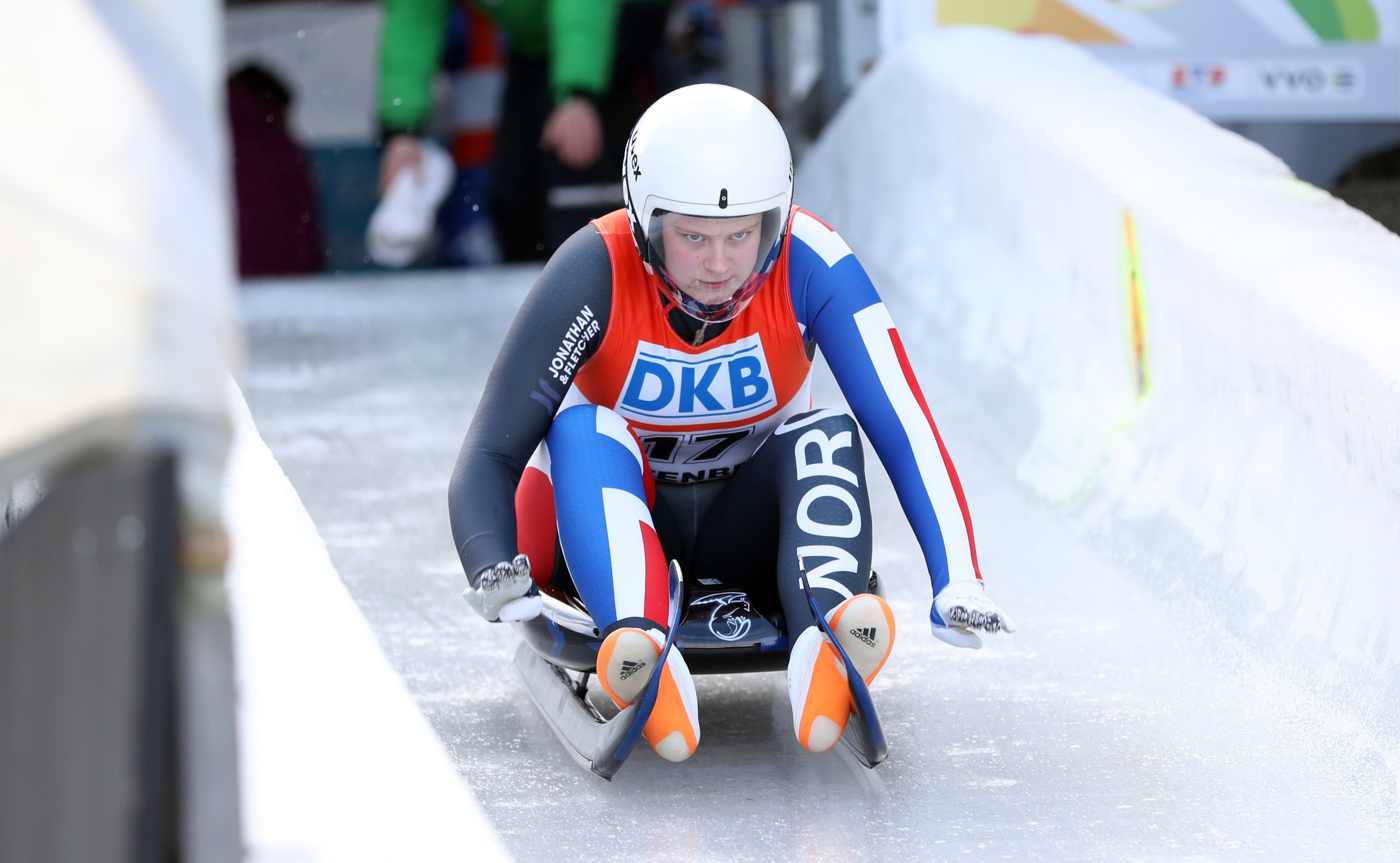
Sledding

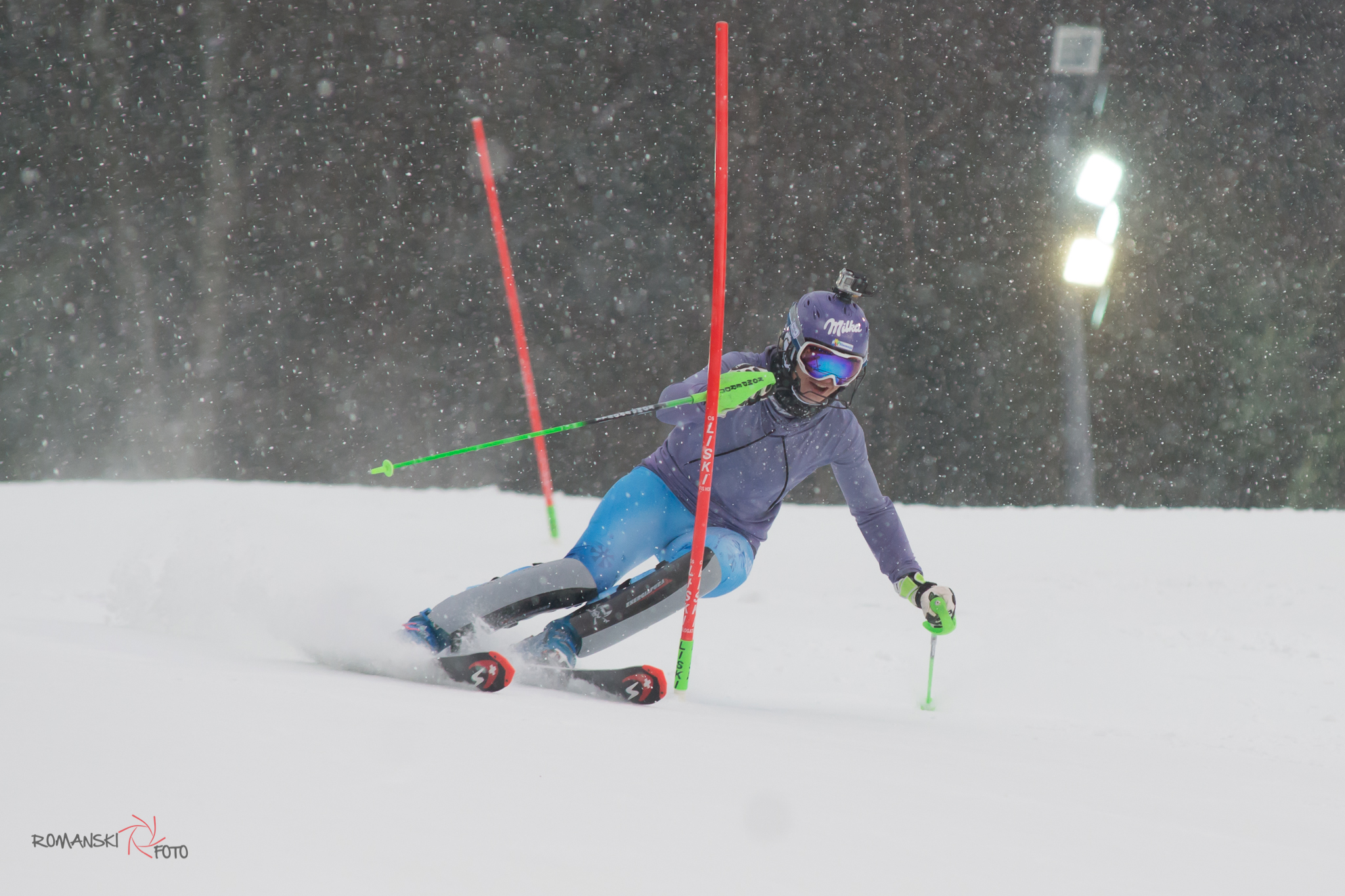
Skiing

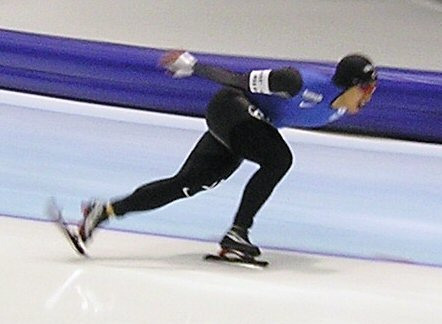
Clap skating

=== Intermittent ===
- Stilts
- Powerbocking
- Pogo stick

== Types of propulsion ==
There are three main methods of using human power to propel a land vehicle: some kind of drivetrain that turns one or more drive wheels; pushing laterally against the ground, to the side relative to the forward motion of the vehicle, with a wheel, skate, or ski that simultaneously moves forward; by pushing against the ground directly with an appendage, such as a hand or a foot, opposite to the direction of travel, or by pushing against the air with a propeller.

=== Lateral motion of one or more wheels, skis, or skates ===
- Ice skating
- Skate skiing
- Inline skating and double push

=== Direct contact with the ground ===
- Skateboarding
- Kicksleding
- Poling

== See also ==
- Human-powered aircraft
  - Human-powered helicopter
- Human-powered watercraft
- Human-powered transport
