= Caster board =

Two-wheeled, human-powered land vehicle

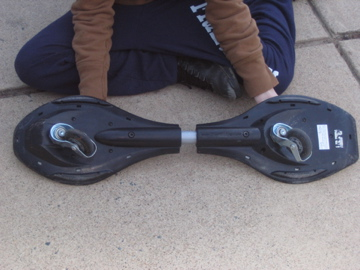
The bottom of a typical casterboard

A caster board, vigorboard or waveboard is a two-wheeled, human-powered land vehicle. Other names are J-board and RipStik (sometimes written ripstick or rip stick), both of which are derived from commercial brands.

A caster board has two narrow platforms known as "decks" that are joined by a torsion bar, which consists of a metal beam, usually coated by rubber, that houses a strong spring. One polyurethane wheel is mounted to each deck with a caster so that each wheel can steer independently, and each caster has a steering axis that is tilted about 30° back from the vertical.

== Origins ==
The original caster board was called an "EssBoard", invented by South Korean Singi Kang, who came up with the redesign of the skateboard as early as 2002. His initial patent application that year ("The skateboard that go forward by swing") was revised and resubmitted ("Skateboard with direction-caster"), with approval following in August 2003. Kang's company Slovie partnered with Decolee to mass-produce boards made of ABS alloy. As of December 2003, according to Joongang Daily, two models were available. "The short board is popular for tricks. The long board is faster. (...) EssBoard is still new enough that the repertoire of tricks is evolving almost daily, mostly inspired by skateboarding and snowboarding. These tricks are shared at EssBoard gatherings or through the Internet clubs."

Despite popularity at home and abroad in the following years, Slovie's flagship EssBoard product became a prominent victim of intellectual property rights theft, as "cheap Chinese copycat boards began to erode sales, causing them to dive from 7.4 billion won ($6.5 million) in 2006 to 100 million won" in 2009. “With the loss, employment at the firm shrank from 30 to six."

Kang's application for a US patent was published in late 2004 and granted in 2007 as US patent 7195259B2. In 2006, Slovie had licensed the EssBoard patent to legitimate manufacturers, including two California-based companies: StreetSurfing, makers of The Wave, and Razor, which offered the RipStik. In 2008, Razor secured worldwide rights (outside South Korea and China) to the patent, and by 2010 an industry trade journal noted that "control over the basic caster board patent helped Razor's sales [over] competing sports products (...) similar in appearance and operation."

Within five years of the caster board's invention, before Razor's version eclipsed the others in popularity, a host of designers had come up with small modifications, and for a time the market supported numerous competitors. A UK fansite from the 2008 era posted articles about such rides as the T-Board (created by Tierney Rides), the Blade Board, the Exboard, and the OBoard.

== Movement ==
Demonstration of usage

The motion requires that the board be twisted back and forth so as to move either just the back foot or both the front and back feet side to side, essentially pushing the board forward at the outside of the movement, before the foot is brought back in the other direction. In principle, the act is similar to what is required to propel one who is riding inline skates forward, as opposed to how skateboarders push with their feet on the ground. Riding a caster board requires using a twisting motion of hips and legs.

A rider or "caster boarder" gains speed because each wheel is mounted on a 30° slant on the bottom of each deck. When each deck is pushed to the side, it causes the board to be pushed upward by the wheels' rotation against the gradient of the mounts. This creates potential energy that is then released moves back down under the rider's weight and its own combined. The weight pushing the board back down causes the wheels to turn to face straight again. While riding on a caster board, the increase in height is barely noticeable unless the rider twists the board along the vertical axis too hard, causing stability to be momentarily reduced.

Caster boarding has been introduced into many school curricula as a means of teaching the basic movement principles that govern board-sports. The success in its ability to engage with pupils not interested in sport was assessed in a 12-week, 6 secondary school case study in the UK carried out by Curriculum Ex.

== Foot placement ==
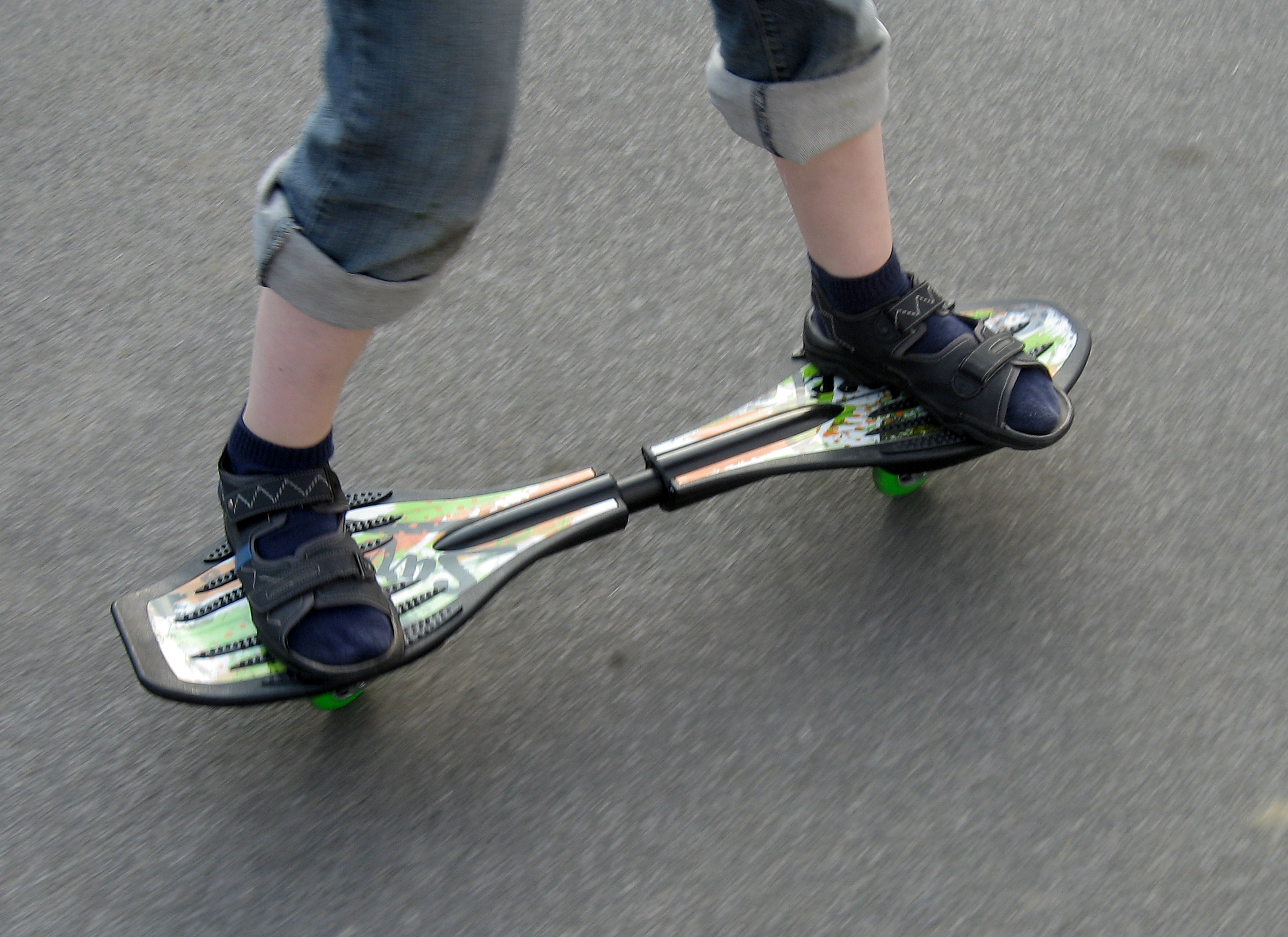
As in skateboarding, riding with the left foot leading is called "Regular stance". Riding with the right foot leading is called "Goofy stance".

Foot placement is similar to that of a skateboard. Foot placement is critical on a caster board because one wheel rests under each foot while in use. In order to start with proper foot placement, it is necessary to have the front foot above the center of the front caster and to allow the back foot to give a good push of speed that will allow the board to keep proper balance. Attempting to place the back foot too quickly will make it even more difficult to achieve a desirable foot placement, so it is best to give that foot a maximum of two seconds for it to properly set itself on the board. More experienced riders will be able to place their back feet more quickly. A manual is performed by putting the rear foot on the back end of the rear deck without letting it come off and gently lifting the front foot.

If the user is already riding the board and the user recognizes that the foot placement is slightly undesirable, the user could replace both feet simultaneously without interrupting their ride that is already taking place. This is done by the rider's first making sure that they are riding at a normal speed and that the riding surface ahead is stable for riding on and then jumping with both feet at a minimal height that allows both shoes to separate their treads from the grips of the caster board. The rider may continue to "hop around" the board until a most desirable foot placement is achieved and for as long as a proper speed is maintained. Hopping around may even more easily produce better results than getting off the board and getting back on again. A much more difficult means of replacing the feet while riding is attempting to correct only one foot at a time, increasing the risk of shifting their weight too far forward or backward and falling to the ground.

== Steering ==
In order to steer properly on a caster board, the front foot must lean into the curve while the back foot leans out of the curve. By leaning the front foot in and the back foot out, the front wheel, which will have its front facing inward, is forced to form an arc with the back wheel, which will have its front facing outward. This arcing allows for very sharp turning, but can be exercised for making wide turns as well. While attempting to turn on the board at a higher speed and/or using a tighter arc, the rider leans their center of gravity into the turn to keep from falling from the board. However, like all vehicles, there is a limit to the combined sharpness and speed of turning on a caster board without it becoming overturned. It is possible to propel the board while turning by making weaving motions that are typically smaller than those of a relatively straight trajectory.

The wrong way to turn on a caster board is to lean both decks in the direction of the turn, which will cause the board to move away from the leaning direction in a parallel-sliding fashion.

== Safety ==
A helmet, elbow pads, knee pads, gloves, and shin guards are recommended when using a caster board.

== Tricks ==
A variety of tricks can be done on a caster board. They are coping and ledge tricks, manuals, Carves and flips. The various flips tricks include: Kickflip, Pop Shove it Half Cab, No Comply Impossible, Double Kickflip, Fakie Kickflip, Switch Kickflip, Fakie Bigspin, Nollie Kickflip, Nollie Heelflip, Nollie Frontside 180 Bigspin, Varial Kickflip, Varial Heelflip, Backside 180 Kickflip, Frontside 180 Heelflip, Frontside 180 Kickflip, 360 Kickflip and the Frontside 180 Double Kickflip.

== Skatepark ==
Casterboarders can ride in skateparks as with other types of skateboards. However, some skateparks have prohibited caster boards. Planet Park (Hachioji city) skatepark in Tokyo, Japan allows only skateboards with four wheels and a single deck. The Japan Skatepark Association claims that if a caster board rider falls, it can be difficult to predict which direction the board will travel, constituting an unpredictable element of danger that may interfere with other skateboarders, inline-skaters and BMX riders in the park. Even so, some caster boards including the RipStik G are made with adjustments. This board in particular has a stronger connecting center, allowing for the board to grind (hence the 'G') on rails or curbs.

== Exercise ==
In 2009, St Helens Council in England promoted the boards in several of its schools, seeing it as a method of inspiring children who would not normally take part in traditional exercise, and praising it as "a fully inclusive activity that requires a great deal of skill and fitness". Some teachers at the schools reported drops in truancy, with pupils not wishing to miss school should they miss their "Vigorboard" session.

An independent study conducted by the University of Salford found that vigorboarding resulted in an average increase in heart rate of 227% and a 535% increase in energy expenditure. The study also concluded that vigorboarding results in a 233% greater energy expenditure (407kcal/hr) than walking at 3 mph (174.5kcal/hr). In its conclusion, the study said that Vigorboarding "may be a useful alternative to increasing physical activity levels and energy expenditure, especially for individuals that do not wish to participate in the usual sports or activities performed by adolescents."

== See also ==
- Freeline skates
- Self-balancing scooter
- Skateboard
- Snakeboard
- Snowboard
