= Free skate =

Free skate may refer to:

- Inline skates
- Free skating
- Freeskates
