= Carveboarding =

Boardsport that takes place on hard surfaces

Carveboarding is a boardsport that takes place on hard surfaces such as roads and sidewalks. It combines elements of surfing, snowboarding, and skateboarding, providing a riding experience that resembles surfing and snowboarding.

The board used in carveboarding is equipped with small hinges that allow it to tilt up to approximately 45° relative to the horizontal position. This tilt capability, which is much greater than traditional skateboard trucks, enables more aggressive turns and reduces speed loss during carving. Unlike skateboarding, carveboarding/surfskating allows riders to accelerate without needing to push a foot against the ground (commonly known as tic-tac in skateboarding), keeping the front wheels off the ground.

The ability to quickly change edges (rail to rail) allows riders to generate speed through flexion and extension, similar to "shortboard" surfing and snowboarding. This carving effect helps develop the necessary skills for progressing in surfing and snowboarding.

Carveboarding aims to replicate the sensations of surfing, much like skateboarding did in its early stages. It also shares similarities with certain styles of snowboarding, given the historical connection between the two sports. Unlike the freebord and T-board, which were specifically designed to emulate snowboarding on a skateboard-like platform, the carveboard was developed by surfers/snowboarders, David Colley and Brad Gerlach, for surfers/snowboarders.

== See also ==
- Surfskating
