= Aquaplaning (sport) =

Water sport

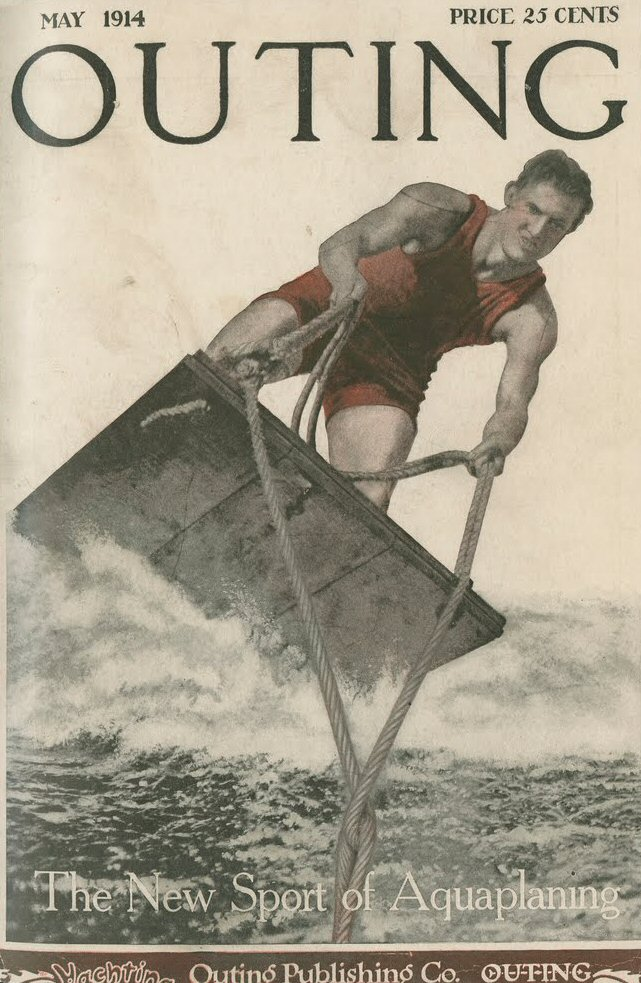
- Outing Magazine - May 1914
- First played: 1900s, United States

Characteristics
- Type: Outdoor

Aquaplaning is a surface water sport which involves riding a board (aquaplane) over the surface of a body of water towed behind a motorboat.

== History ==
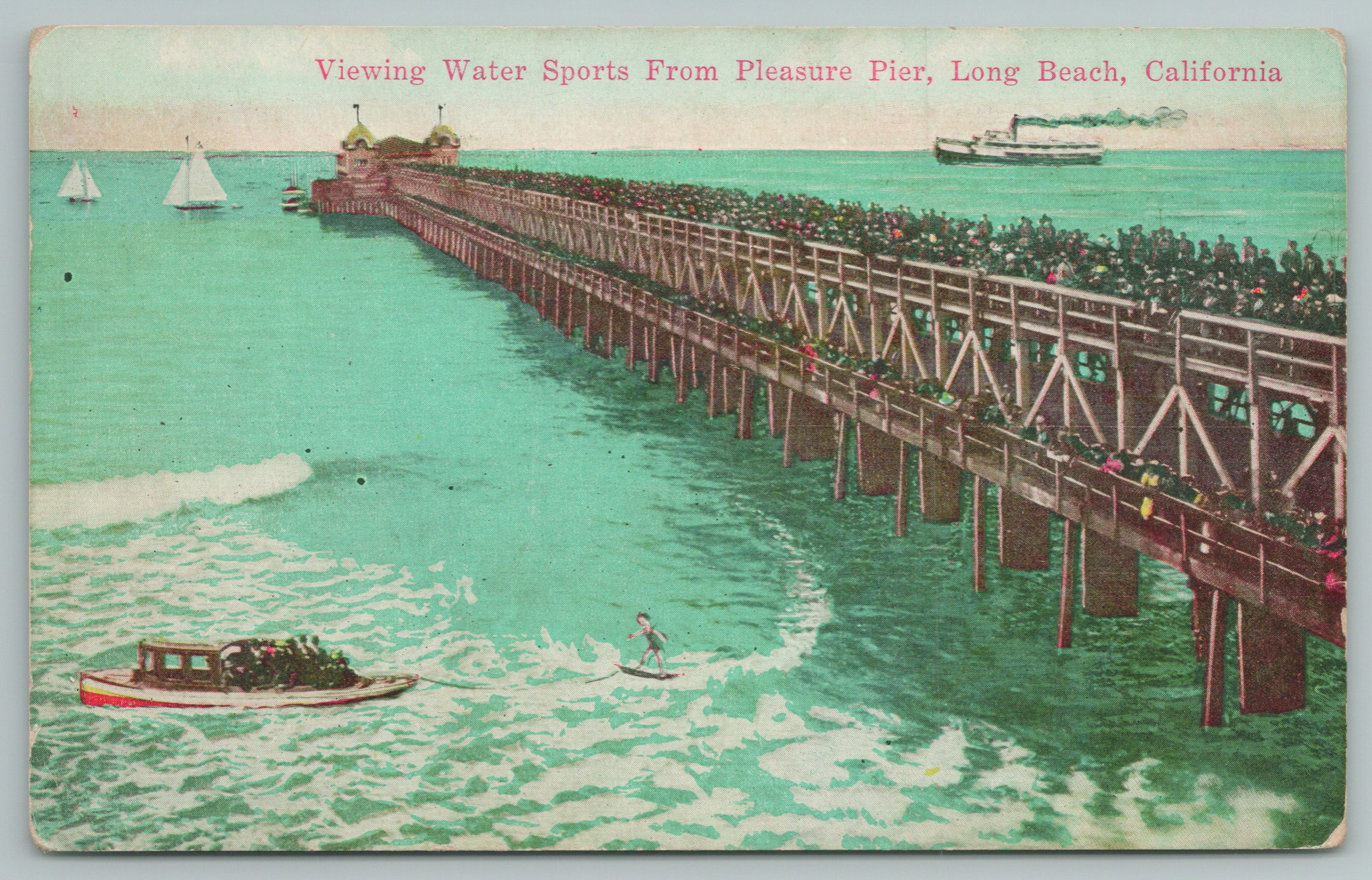
A picture postcard from Long Beach, California (published c. 1907–1914) has a crude drawing of aquaplaning.

Developed in the early 20th century, aquaplaning became popular for several decades but was superseded by the development of similar sports such as water skiing in the 1920s and kneeboarding in the 1950s.

An article in Harper's Weekly indicates the sport began in 1913.

The Wisconsin Rapids newspaper the Wood County Reporter published a picture of a woman aquaplaning on September 4, 1919. The article talks about how the board was developed from the Hawaiian Islanders' surfboards and that by the time of publication thousands were participating in the sport.

From 1935 a 44-mile aquaplane race held between Santa Catalina Island and Hermosa Beach, California endorsed by the American Power Boat Association attracted competitors from around the world.

== Gallery ==
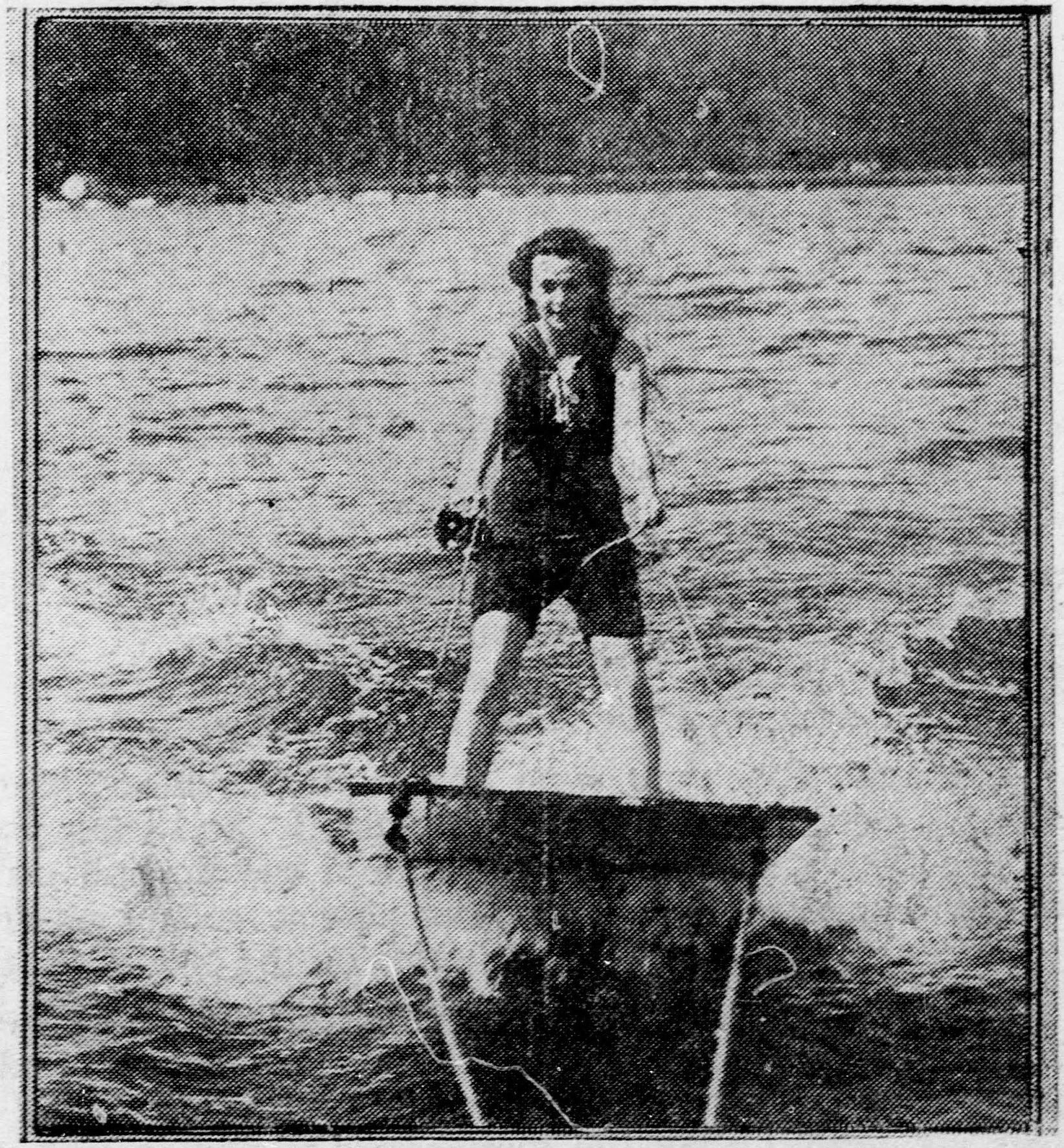
Aquaplaning - Woman towed over the waves at tremendous speed by a motorboat - 1919

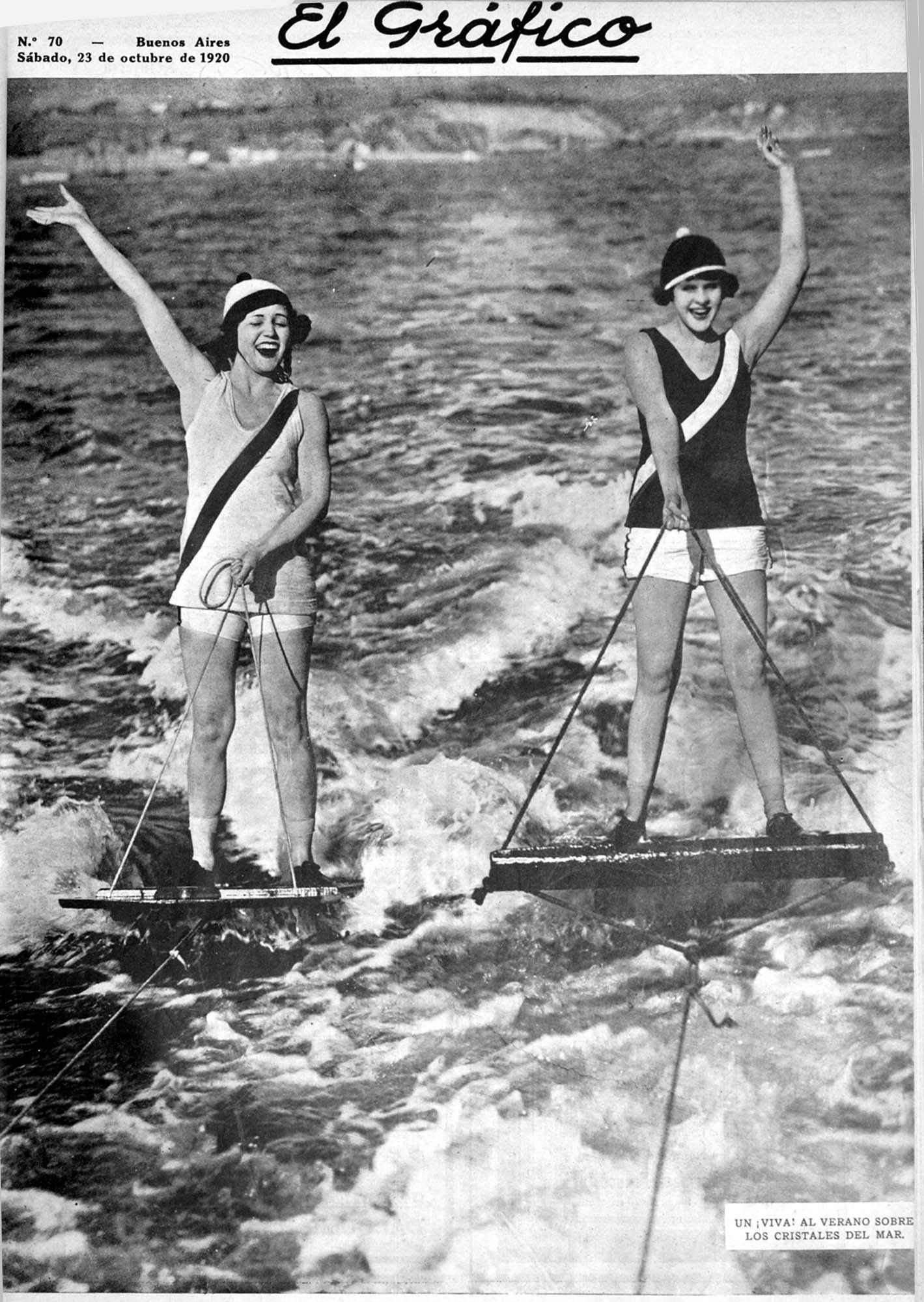
Two women acquaplaning at the sea in Argentina, on the cover of the local magazine El Gráfico published on October 23, 1920.

The Queenslander, November 22, 1928

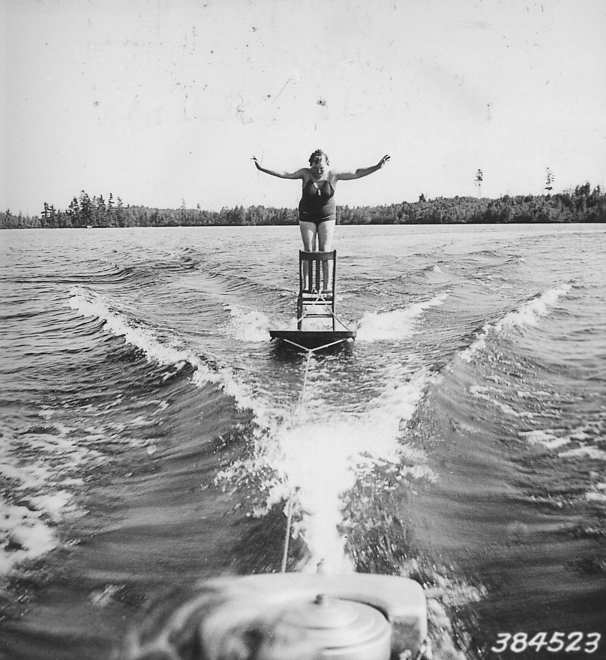
Photograph of Aquaplaning on Newman Lake

== See also ==
- Skurfing (sport)
- Wakeboarding

== Bibliography ==
Notes

References

- Gooley, Lawrence P. (July 23, 2012). "History: Before Water-skiing, There Was Aquaplaning". The Adirondack Almanack.
- Popular Mechanics (May 1942). "The RACE of the "IRONING BOARDS"". Popular Mechanics - Vol. 77, No. 5. Hearst Magazines. p. 232. ISSN 0032-4558.
- Wood County Reporter (September 4, 1919). "Aquaplaning? It's Fine Sport This Fair Devotee Tells You". Wood County Reporter. Wisconsin Rapids, Wood, Wisconsin: J.N. Brundage. pp. 1–4. ISSN 2572-5904. OCLC 11648005.
