= Surfskating =

Style of skateboarding

Surfskating, or surf skateboarding, is a form of skateboarding that replicates the experience of surfing on dry land. A surfskate system is distinguished from a traditional skateboard system by the utilization of two different trucks, front and back, with specific functions and geometries that, together, yield thrust, just like a surfboard.

Surfskates, or surf skateboards, were invented by surfers who wanted a way to surf on days with no waves. Surfskates are often used by surfers to train for surfing.

Surfskating is differentiated from carveboarding, which refers to riding a Carveboard specifically, which are no longer in production. Since Carveboards use the same trucks on front and rear, they do not generate thrust in the same way that surfskates do.

== Function ==
Standard "traditional kingpin" (TKP) or "reverse kingpin" (RKP) skateboard or longboard trucks only turn on their kingpin axis. Skateboards and longboards also typically have the same trucks on the front and rear.

On a surfskate system, the front truck has a rotation arm that allows a normal truck to turn on an additional vertical axis, parallel to the deck. The rear truck acts as a pivot point that the board rotates around, performing a similar function as the back fins on a surfboard.

=== Surfskate systems enable pumping and carving ===
When riding standard TKP or RKP skateboard or longboard trucks, riders must push the ground with their feet to continue moving on a flat surface. With surfskate trucks, riders are able to pump their surfskate in the same way that surfers pump surfboards to generate speed on waves. This means you can ride for long distances on a surfskate without ever touching the ground, as if you were "surfing" the streets.

With the additional axis of rotation on the front truck, surfskates are also able to turn much more sharper than standard TKP or RKP trucks. This allows riders to perform the type of tight carving maneuvers typically seen in surfing.

=== Construction ===
There are many different types of surfskate systems, but they all follow the same principle of combining a rotating arm on the front truck with a stable rear truck. Typically, bushings or springs are used to enable the additional axis of rotation on a front surfskate truck. One exception is the Curfboard, which swivels on hinges. The first surfskate company, Carver Skateboards, released its first surfskate truck, the C7, in 1996. Since then, many other companies have released dozens of different original surfskate truck designs. These include, but are not limited to:

- Abian Pro
- Aquilo
- Carver C5
- Carver C7
- Carver CX
- Curfboard
- Grasp
- Landyachtz Bear Banger
- Long Island Genesis Lean
- OVNI
- Slide V3
- Smoothstar Thruster
- Solride
- SpiceSkate SpicePilot
- SpiceSkate Okto
- Surfeeling Alpine Truck
- SwellTech
- Waterborne Surf Adapter
- Wood-00 Poom Surfskate Truck
- WoodDetail
- YOW Meraki

== History of surfskating ==
Skateboarding is rooted in surfing. It was started in the 1950s by surfers looking for a way to surf on "flat" days with no waves. These early skateboarders were called "asphalt surfers."

As skateboarding evolved, it drifted away from its surfing roots and focused heavily on street skating and technical tricks.

In the mid-1990s, various attempts were made to create skateboard trucks that simulated more of a "surf-like" experience. During this time, surfer friends Neil Stratton and Greg Falk in Venice Beach, California were among those in the quest to create a functional skateboard truck that felt like surfing. Among their key insights was the realization that adding more turn to the front truck must be combined with a stable rear truck, which acts as a pivot point for the radically turning front truck.

After many iterations, they finalized their "carving truck" design and launched it under the name Carver Skateboards in 1996. The called their new carving truck the C1 and secured a patent on the design. Based on feedback from riders, they fine-tuned their design and called the new improved version the C7. The Carver C7, which uses a compression spring to drive the rotating arm, is recognized as the first official "surfskate" truck. Carver later released their CX surfskate truck, which uses bushings instead of a compression spring, is also among the most well-known and popular surfskate trucks.

Since Carver launched, the sport has grown in popularity and many other companies have released many different surfskate truck designs.

=== Current trends ===
The sport is most popular in well-known surfing locations. However, as more non-surfers take up the sport, it is becoming increasingly international and inclusive. Ryan Theobald VP Sales and Marketing at Landyachtz explains, "It's also well promoted by influencers to have a completely inclusive vibe. Low barriers to entry help as well, no tricks, just turning, people see that and believe they could enjoy it too."

Jordi Quinto, Skate Specialist at Hydroponic agrees, saying, "Riders of all ages see it as an easier practice to master than traditional street and skatepark skating, and especially older riders and those who have been surfing for a while have embraced it quickly and passionately."

Steve Douglas at Rolling Thunder Distribution (OP Skateboards) added, "From avid surfers to surfer wannabe's to older guys that just want to keep the momentum and balance going. It really reaches a broad demographic."

Regarding how he has seen the surfskate audience evolve, Benoit Brecq at Flying Wheels said, "At the beginning, the market was for surfers looking to improve their surf tricks when the waves weren't good. Now, more and more people are using surfskates because the surfing sensation is really close to real surfing in water."

Between 2020 and 2021, surfskating surged in popularity across the world as a result of the COVID-19 pandemic, when lockdowns made travel difficult. Thailand in particular experienced an explosive growth of surfskating during this time.

Surfskating is also on the uprise in China.
