= Skurfing =

Towed water sport

Skurfing is a towed water sport in which an individual is pulled behind a boat on a tow rope. The sport uses a skurfboard, which is a floating platform the user balances on, similar to a surfboard but typically much shorter, with two foot-straps that prevent falling off the board and three fins positioned on the bottom that make it easier to maneuver when the board is being towed. The word itself is a portmanteau of skiing and surfing. Skurfing is often considered the precursor to wakeboarding.

== History ==
A skurfer riding the wave while being pulled by a rope

Skurfing was inspired by an unknown man being pulled by a boat on a surfboard in Lake Havasu, Arizona. The boat was being towed behind a motorboat at planing speed with a tow rope similar to that of kneeboarding and wakeboarding. The planing speed of the motorboat was equivalent to the speed generated by a wave, which allowed the skurfer to ride behind the boat the same way a surfer would ride a wave. When the water is flat, skurfing is easier than surfing.

Australian surfboard shaper and inventor Bruce McKee, along with associate Mitchell Ross, launched the world's first mass-produced plastic roto-molded construction skurfboard. Its original name was "Mcski", later renamed "SSS" skiboard, or 'Wake-snake' in Australia. The board had adjustable rubber foot straps, a concave tunnel bottom, and a keel fin. Two smaller side fins were later added for greater hold and maneuverability.

Later in 1985, California surfer Tony Finn invented the "Skurfer", a shorter, more narrow version of a surfboard with foot straps. Although the "Skurfer" was originally trademarked by Tony Finn, the word skurfing was potentially coined in New Zealand by surfboard shaper Allan Byrne. Byrne lent a surfboard to a man named Jeff Darby, in Queensland, Australia, who then started to make his own, and later came in contact with Finn, who would later produce the brand 'Skurfer' under royalty.

The launch of the product's American version being named the 'Surf-Ski' was in 1984 at Chicago's 'IMTEC' show. At the show, McKee also met Tony Finn who was the proposed Californian representative. Tony Finn went on to do his own negotiations with Darby, and the result was the US boards later launched under the 'Skurfer' brand name.

Skurfing has been used in adapting other sports, such as surfing. Before skurfing was invented, there were limitations to paddling onto larger waves when surfing because surfers lacked the speed needed to stay in front of the wave. Skurfing has the speed needed to catch the wave successfully by towing the surfer towards big waves.

== Popularity ==
The first Skurfer championships were televised on ESPN in 1990.

Skurfing is a freestyle sport; it is not a professional sport and has no official competitions.

== Styles ==
There are two main styles of water skurfing: noseriding – mostly used by people who surf on a longboard – or using cutbacks, carves, and other turns.

The maneuvers on a skurfboard are similar to those on a surfboard. These maneuvers include:

- Cut-backs
- 180° rotations
- 360° rotations
- Serial jumps
- Power slides
- Freeriding

Freeriding is when the wake is surfed without a rope. First, the rider pulls themselves up the rope so that they are skurfing in the largest part of the wake. The rider then gently pumps the board to maintain speed and moves their weight further forward to help them stay on the wake wave. Once they are being propelled by the wake, the rope is thrown back into the boat.

The latest style of skurfing is riding with the fins removed from the bottom of the board. This finless style requires more balance and finesse than having the fins attached. Not having fins limits cutbacks and carving, but it allows the rider to spin the board around in a 360-degree rotation.

== See also ==
- Aquaplaning (sport)
- Wakesurfing
