= Kneeboarding (towsport) =

Water sport

Kneeboard backflip

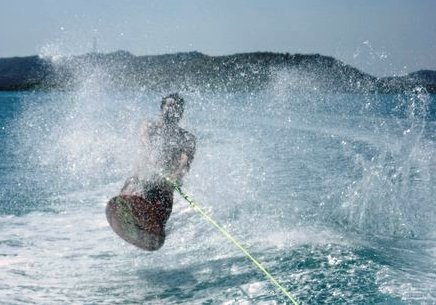
Kneeboarder

Kneeboarding is an aquatic sport where the participant is towed on a buoyant, convex, and hydrodynamically shaped board at a planing speed, most often behind a motorboat. Kneeboarding on a surf style board with fin(s) is also done in waves at the beach. In the usual configuration of a tow-sport kneeboard, riders kneel on their heels on the board, and secure themselves to the deck with an adjustable Velcro strap over their thighs. Most water ski kneeboards do not have fins to allow for easier surface spins. As in wakeboarding or water skiing, the rider hangs onto a tow-rope. The advantages of kneeboarding versus other tow-sports seems to be an easier learning curve and a sense of being closer to the water when falls occur must have strong knees and knee without any operations.

== See also ==
- Aquaplaning (sport)
