= T-board =

Type of longboard skateboard

A T-board is a longboard skateboard with only two wheels, designed to mimic the sensation of carving on a snowboard. The design differs from a traditional skateboard in a way similar to how rollerblades differ from traditional roller skates. The two wheels simulate a carving edge on pavement. The innovative design allows the board to tilt at a 60-degree angle, like a surf/snowboard, rather than the standard 25 degrees on a skateboard.

T-boards are popular with surfers and snowboarders who use it to stay in good form when the weather conditions are not ideal. Surfers like that the design allows big turns or quick short carves similar to a surfboard. Snowboarders appreciate the T-boards pure carve feeling, often comparing it to snowboarding in powder.

== History ==
In June 2006, there was a T-Board tour in Canada and on the North East-Coast of the US. The goal was to find new places to ride in different cities. Since the first tour was a success there was a second one in 2007 who covered the South East-Coast of the US.

A charity speed record event is planned by Greg Kett, UK using a T-Board.

Based out of Chicago\Palatine Illinois Tyler Tierney and his brother designed the Tierney board over 3.5 years to its final shape.

The Tierneyrides.com website is currently offline.
