= Snakeboard =

Type of skateboard with separate footplates

A snakeboard, also known as a streetboard, is a type of skateboard invented in South Africa in 1989 by James Fisher, Simon King and Oliver Macleod Smith. The concept was to fuse the original skateboard with elements of snowboarding and surfing to create a fun riding experience. The first prototype was constructed using two square wooden boards, an old roller skate chopped in half, and a piece of plumbing pipe to join them together. Many variants were tried before manufacturing began. The first boards to be mass-produced were made from a strong plastic nylon known as Zytel ST801.

== Performance ==
The rider of a snakeboard stands with one foot on each footplate (the feet are usually fixed to the board using bindings) and, by moving their feet in and out in conjunction with the shoulders and hips, is able to propel the board in any direction using only body weight. This transfer of energy is called nonholonomic locomotion. The board moves in a motion similar to that of a snake—hence the sport's original name of snakeboarding. The rider of a snakeboard can ride the board on almost any terrain (depending on the setup and model of board) and even propel himself uphill and perform extreme stunts similar to those done by skateboarders and snowboarders. Snakeboards allow riders to gain momentum without the need to push themselves with their feet like skateboarders.

== History ==
Skatex International (Pty) Ltd is the name of the first company that manufactured boards of this kind and was the inventors' original company. Skatex International licensed Snakeboard USA to sell and distribute the boards in the United States; the sport rapidly became known as "snakeboarding". James Fisher, Simon King and Oliver Macleod Smith jointly owned the patents and trademarks for the sport. In the late 1990s, the inventors licensed PMS (UK), a toy retailer, to manufacturer the "Sydewynder" under license. Over 50,000 Sydewynders were sold in the UK and Europe. The inventors then listed their company Snakeboard International AIM market, a division of the London Stock Exchange. Later there was a reverse acquisition of Snakeboard International by a company called MV Sports. MV Sports eventually stopped manufacturing the Snakeboard. However, the sport survives today with more advanced boards and is becoming more widely known as streetboarding. The remaining snakeboard patents expired in 2011.

A snakeboard is self-propelled, and there is no need to touch a foot on the ground. Moreover, it is considerably easier to generate and maintain momentum than on a skateboard. To perform a trick, one's feet must be strapped to the board, which makes it harder to "bail out" of a trick or dismount. Although the footstraps limit the amount a rider can manipulate the board, they also facilitate certain techniques. Much like a snowboarder, the rider can perform spins and somersaults higher and farther than any skateboarder. At the same time, this means a faster learning curve. While a skateboarder will spend weeks learning the most basic manoeuvres, such as the ollie, or jump, a streetboarder (snakeboarder) simply has to strap himself to the board and jump as he would without the board attached.

Toe-hooks have been developed in more recent years as an alternative to straps for riders who are not performing complex tricks. These allow the rider to jump with the board but also enable the rider to dismount from the board or "bail" in the event of a fall as they are not strapped to the board.

== Names ==
Snakeboard is the brand name created by the original inventors of the board and comes from its snake-like movement. The trademark for the term snakeboard expired in 2002. The term streetboard began to be used around that time to describe any board where the wheels and trucks rotate with the rider's feet without referring to a specific brand. The name "streetboard" comes from the idea that it is a "snowboard for the streets". The original patent for the snakeboard refers to the board as a "Pivoting Skateboard" and in recent years there has been discussions around using more technically descriptive terms such as pivotboard and pivotskate. The term swingboard has also been used.

== Original Snakeboard USA Models ==
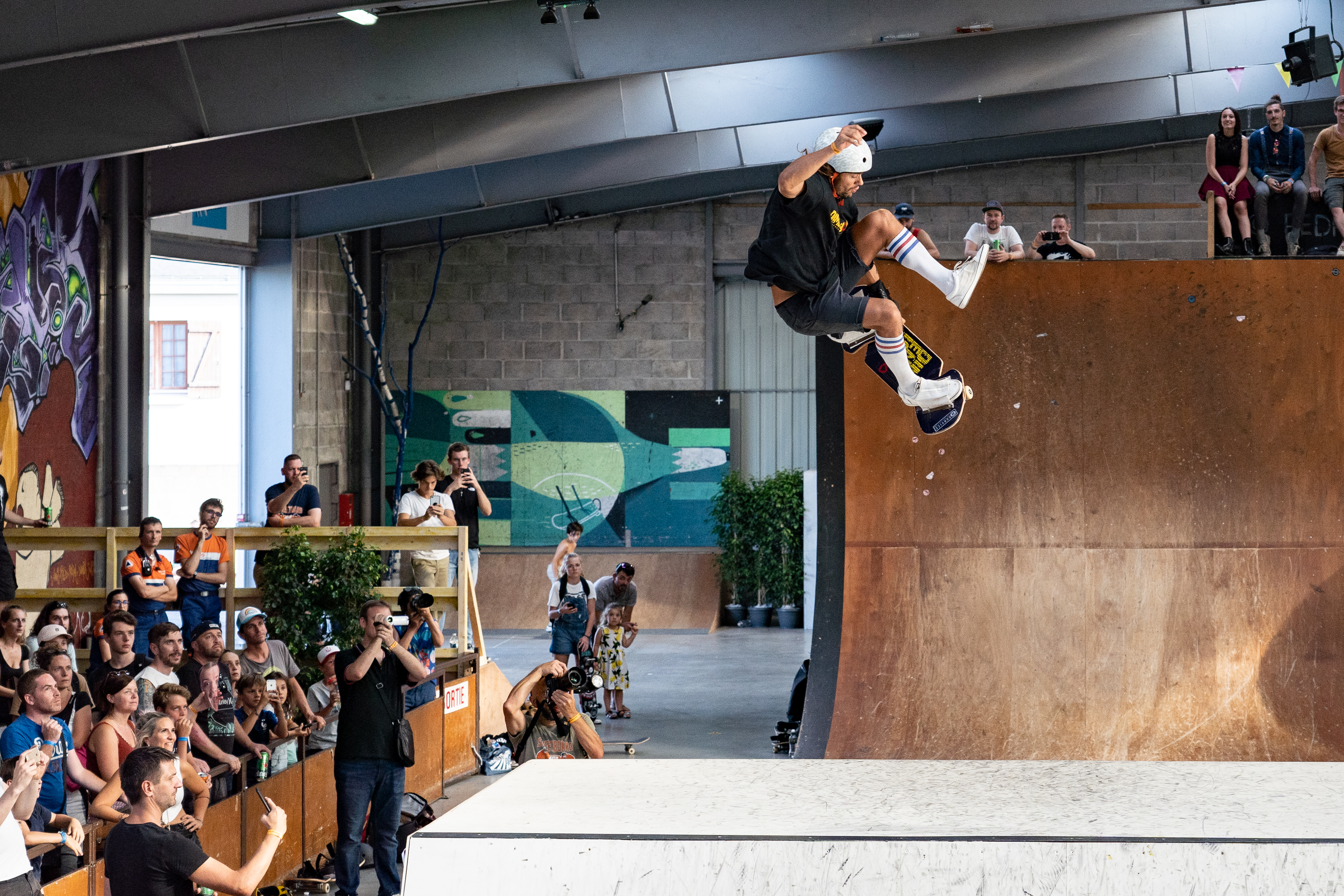

- Viper
- Competition
- Viper Pro
- Pro
- Pro X (Longbar)
- Browser/Stud
- Ashley Pro
- Skinner
- Loadie
- Stiffy
- Spluge

== Gallery ==
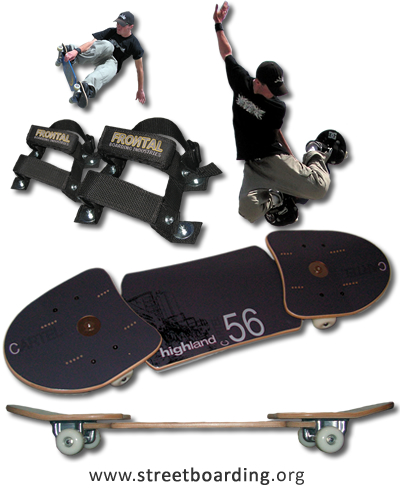
Modern streetboard with bindings (foot straps) and a streetboarder in action.

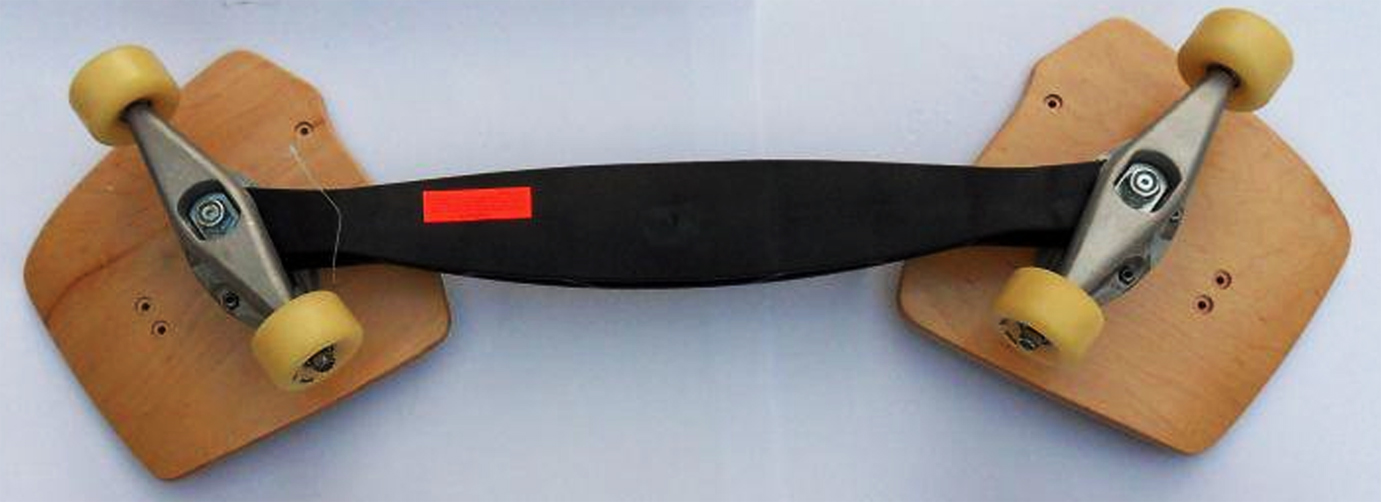

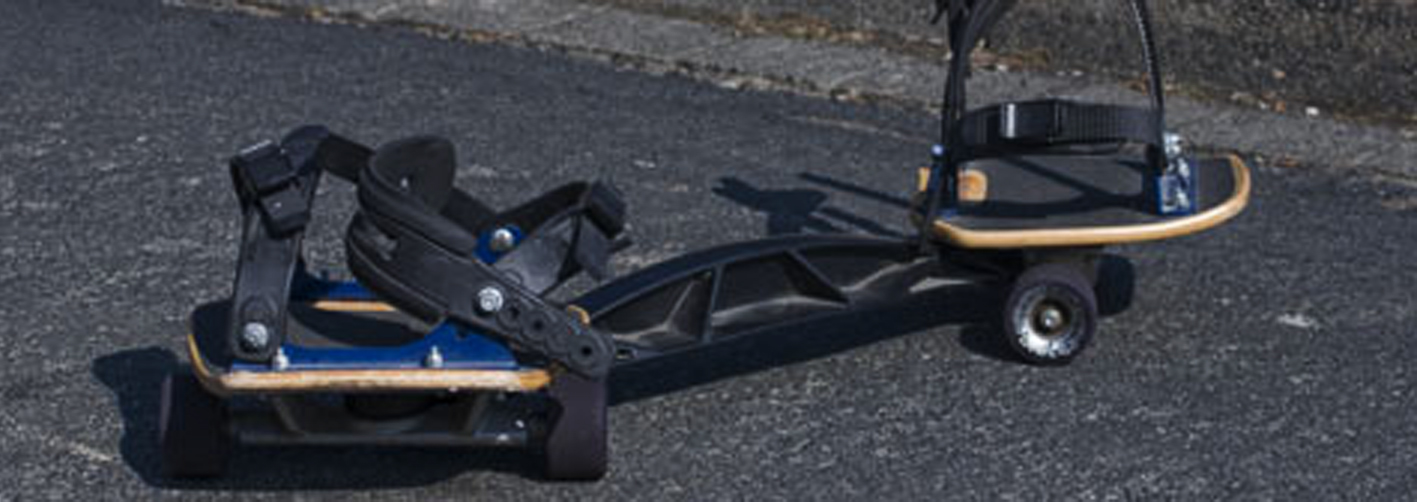

== See also ==
- Skateboard
