= Freeskates =

Type of skates

Freeskates is a type of sports equipment made of two separate metal or wooden decks with two polyurethane in-line wheels attached to the underside by a pair of angled trucks. It is referred to as freeskating, freeline skating, or drift skating.

== History ==
Freeskates were developed in 2002 in San Francisco by Ryan Farrelly, and a patent was filed by Farrelly and Jason Galoob in 2003. Farrelly founded a company called Freeline which sold freeskates starting in 2005. Freeline Sports, Inc has since gone out of business. Freeskating is practiced around the world. In 2015, former members of the original brand (Freeline) came together to create JMKRIDE. Based in San Diego, California JMKRIDE aimed to revive the sport. The sport was rebranded to be called "freeskating" to reach worldwide riders.

== Description of motion ==
To ride, the rider is positioned sideways and move their feet back-and-forth in a motion called pumping to accelerate. The acceleration is enhanced by swinging arms and hips, providing a counterweight to the push against the skates.

To move forward, the feet move in opposite sinusoidal paths with varying phase, so the rider can exert forces to move. When both feet are in phase, this variation is called "double pumping".

To turn left or right, the feet are moved outwards or inwards, creating an arc for the skates to turn.

=== Stance ===
The left foot on the forward skate and the right on the back is colloquially known as "regular", the opposite "goofy" – the same as in other boarded sports, like skateboarding.

== Wheels ==
Traditionally the diameter is 58–72 mm, and the profile is flat, while newer style wheels are curved, creating a different contact profile.

The thickness and size of the wheels affects the stance and style of the motion, and thus the types of tricks that can be used, such that "throwbacks", a trick where you balance on one skate while the other leaves, and comes back and ends in normal riding, are preferred on curved wheels, while flat wheels provide more stability on the horizontal axis.

== Gallery ==
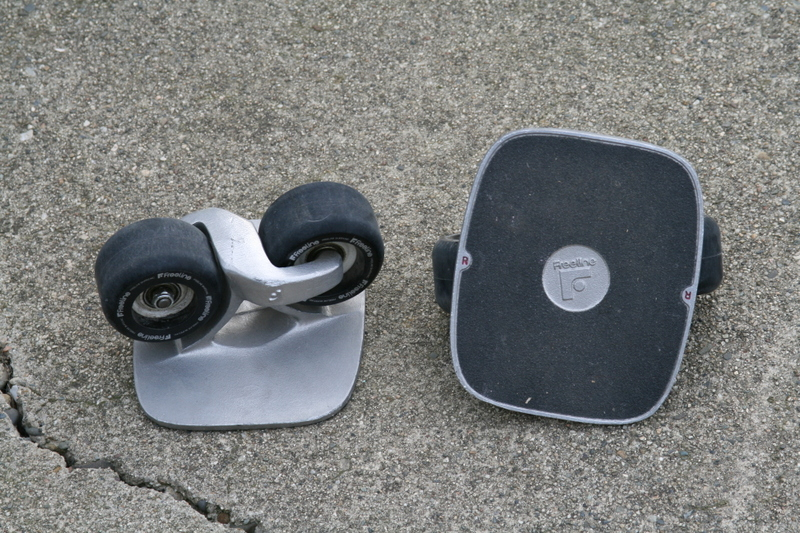
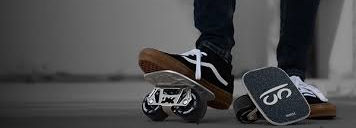
Detail of the Freeline skates.

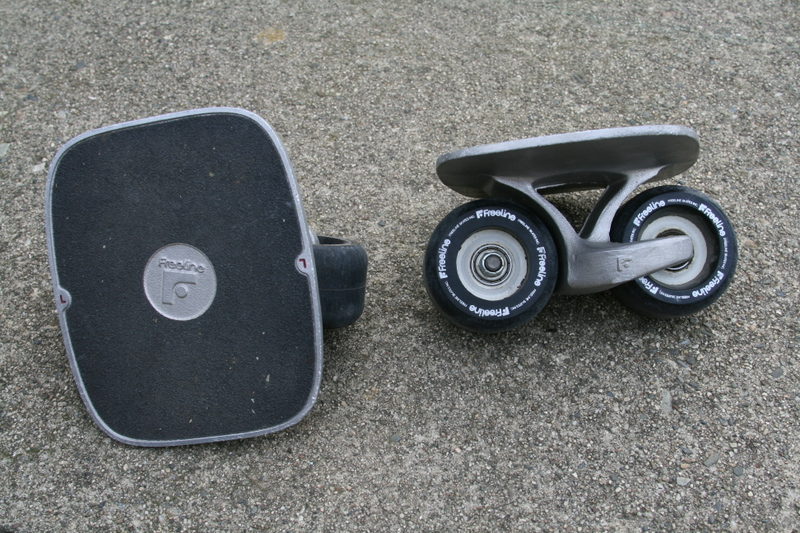
Side view of the Freeline Skates

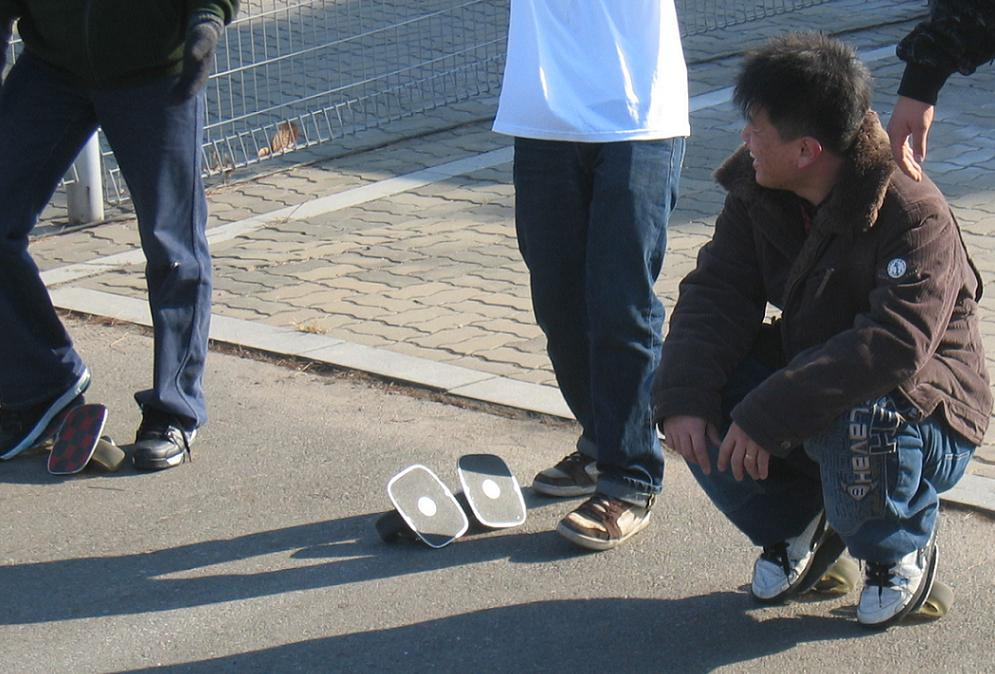
Freeskaters resting in Seoul.
