= Bamboo Skateboards =

American skateboard manufacturing company

Bamboo Skateboards is a Fallbrook, California, skateboard brand and manufacturer of skateboards made from bamboo from managed forests. Formed in 2008, by a team of entrepreneurs, it is owned by Mark Gregson and Hal Miller.

Originally named “BambooSK8” the name was changed to Bamboo Skateboards in 2012. During that year, they were awarded “Best New Skateboards of 2012” by “skateboarding magazine.”

Bamboo skateboards sells skateboard decks, longboard completes, wheels, as well as eco-friendly softgoods and apparel. Its longboards include drop-throughs, pintails, double-kicks, square tails and mini cruisers.
