= Penny Skateboards =

Australian skateboard company

- Type: Private
- Industry: Skateboards
- Founded: June 2010
- Founder: Ben Mackay
- Headquarters: Brisbane, Australia
- Number of locations: area served Australia and New Zealand
- Products: Skateboards
- Website: www.pennyskateboards.com

Penny Skateboards is Australian skateboard manufacturing companies founded in 2010 by Ben Mackay in Brisbane.

== Products ==
The company is most well-known for their creation of the Penny board, a 22" plastic skateboard. Along with the penny board, the company has created other products similar to the penny board such as a larger, 27" variant sometimes referred to as a nickel board. Their 29" model, called the "Surfskate", was created with the intent for the rider to feel as if they are surfing while riding the board. The company also offers a 32" and 36" board which are similar to a typical skateboard and longboard respectively.

Penny boards are especially popular among younger riders and students for their compact size and portability in urban settings.

== See also ==
- List of skateboarding brands
