= Hamboards =

American company that makes surf skateboards

- Type: Private company
- Industry: Sports equipment
- Founded: 2012; 14 years ago
- Founder: Pete Hamborg
- Headquarters: Huntington Beach, California, United States
- Area served: Worldwide
- Key people: Peter Hamborg, Don Sandusky, Abraham Paskowitz, Steve Ng and Robert Herjavec
- Products: Surfskate boards, skate Poles
- Website: hamboards.com

Hamboards is an American manufacturer that sells surf skateboards that include rail-to-rail Surfskates, SUPskates, Paddles and Accessories.

Most Hamboards are longer, wider and sit higher off the ground than conventional skateboards and longboards. Hamboards also turn much more than conventional skateboards. The enabling technology are the patented Hamboards Surfskate Trucks (HST), featuring 30 degrees of roll (in each direction), which allows these huge boards to track and pump aggressive surf-style carving maneuvers.

The Street Sweeper SUPskate Paddle flexes significantly, allowing the user to spring themselves along with comfort. The original Hamboards were intended to be ridden barefoot, like surfboards. Most promotional materials, such as videos show barefoot riders

== History ==
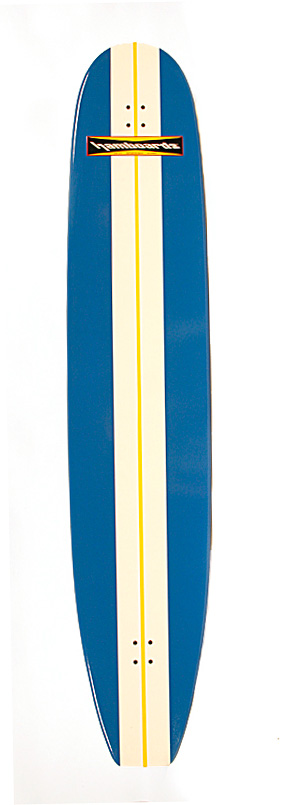
Blue Classic Hamboard from 2012

Pete Hamborg, a Huntington Beach Fireman and father of five boys, created the first Hamboards as a garage hobby to allow his sons (and their friends) to surf the pavement on days that the actual surf was too big or too small. Years of tinkering and optimization led to the first Hamboards assembled in bulk. The design comprised bamboo or birch decks, fitted with commercially available branded trucks, wheels and bearings. For the next several years, Hamboards were assembled by friends and family from a small shop in Huntington Beach where they were also sold locally. This configuration worked reasonably well, at small scale, except for the nagging design flaw inherent in the trucks which were never designed for the enormous loads imparted by the huge and wide Hamboards decks.

Years later in 2012, as the demands of running a small business became burdensome, Pete enlisted his east coast cousin Don Sandusky who was an experienced entrepreneur, engineer, inventor and sporting goods executive. An asset purchase agreement was executed with Pete and Hamboards Holdings, LLC was formed.

Within a year of forming an actual company, Hamboards was featured on Shark Tank on ABC, Season 5, Episode 4, which aired on October 12, 2013. Businessman Robert Herjavec offered $300K in exchange for a 30% stake in the company. The terms of the actual arrangement is bound by confidential terms. Notwithstanding, the television segment was popular and enjoyed multiple reruns, launching the brand around the world.

The conversion from garage hobby to business was a challenging scale exercise. Hamboards started as a family operated, local specialty skateboard retail shop in Huntington Beach, CA and rapidly transformed into an international direct to consumer online business, that produced several variations of the longboard and skateboard, including The Classic, Pinger, Logger, Fish, Huntington Hop, Pescadito, Biscuit and Street Sweeper skate poles. During the following five years, the company derived mass-produced manufacturing, its own online retail sales channel, and its own content production capability.

In 2016 the company accepted its first equity investment from a Southern California investor. Within the year, the investor changed his mind, demanding his investment returned. This was a pivotal vertical event and nearly killed the company. Abruptly, Pete stopped working on Hamboards and focused on his grandchildren. His cousin, Don Sandusky bought-out the investor, right-sized the venture and focused on re-inventing the gear.

In 2019 Don enlisted two new partners, Abraham Paskowitz and Steven Ng who put their shoulders into re-inventing the business, focusing on gear marketing and developing a functioning worldwide business. Abraham serves as brand ambassador and leads B2B, Steve is the resident marketing expert and leads B2C while Don leads the company, is the primary admin, "gear head" and operations leader.
