= Electric skateboard =

Type of skateboard powered by an electric motor

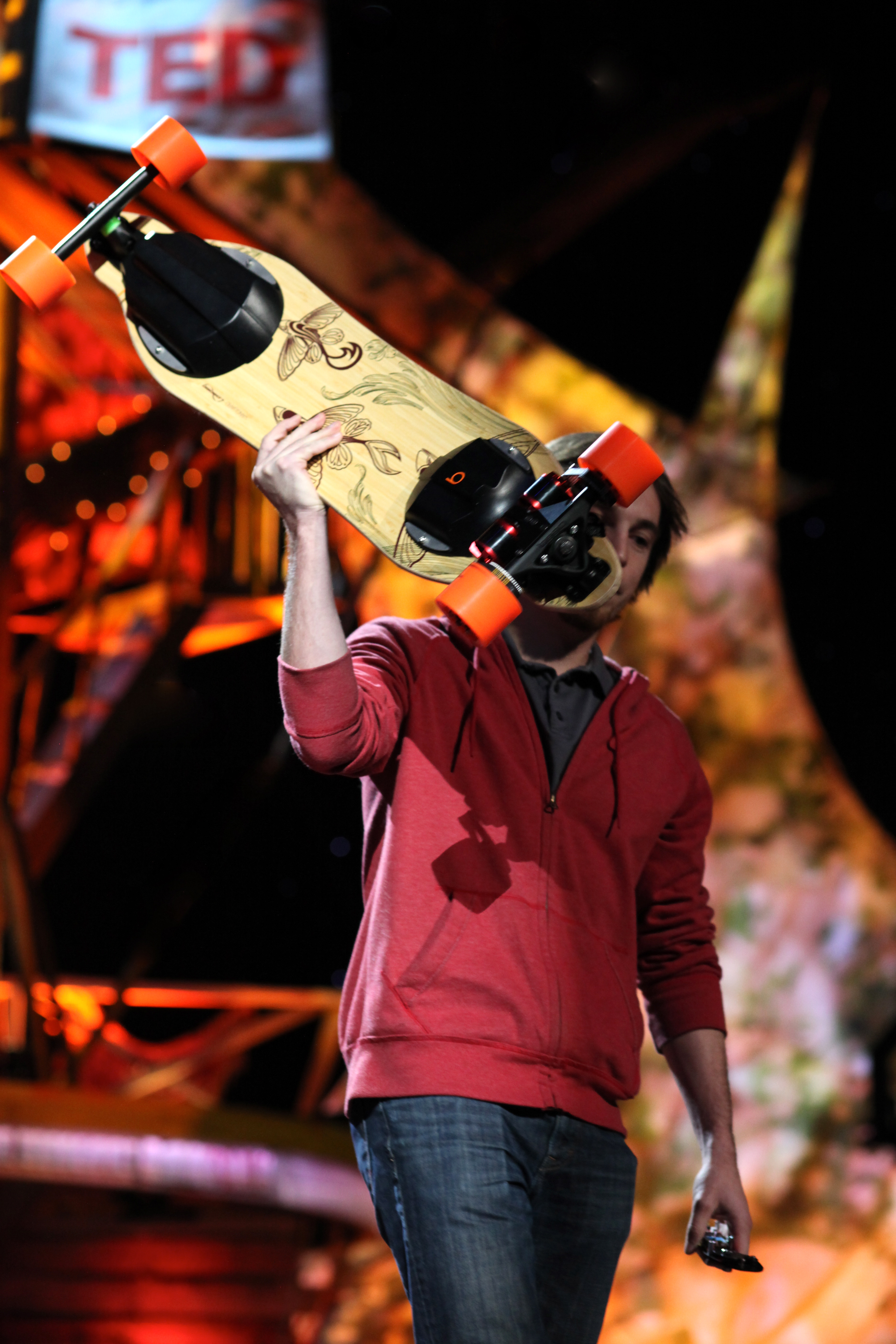
An electric Boosted Board being demonstrated at TED 2013

An electric skateboard is a personal transporter based on a skateboard. The speed is usually controlled by a wireless hand-held throttle remote, or rider body weight-shifting between front of the board for forward motion and rear for braking. As for the direction of travel to the right or left, it is adjusted by tilting the board to one side or the other. The classification of electric skateboards (e.g. whether they qualify as a 'vehicle') and legality of their use on roads or pavements varies between countries.

== History ==
=== Early incarnations ===
The MotoBoard, which was gasoline-powered, was released in the summer of 1975. It was banned in California in 1997 due to noise and pollution. This law was changed in 2017 by Governor Jerry Brown of California. He had the law updated because the previous law was for gas powered skateboards. Electric skateboards create less noise and no pollution.

=== Modern electric devices ===
walkcar' by cocoa motors

Louie Finkle of Seal Beach, California is often cited as an originator of the modern electric skateboard, offering his first wireless electric skateboard in 1997 and a patent filed in April 1999, however it was not until the 2004–2006 that electric motors and batteries were available with sufficient torque and efficiency to power boards effectively.

In 2012, ZBoard, raised nearly 30 times their target for a balance controlled electric skateboard on Kickstarter, which was well received at the Consumer Electronics Show in Las Vegas in January 2013. Their 2015 campaign on Indiegogo was 86 time over-subscribed, raising $1 million.

By 2024, electric skateboards had become lighter and the remote controllers more advanced. They also could travel at higher speeds with longer battery life.

== Types of electric skateboards ==
There are multiple variations of electric skateboards and longboards, but 5 main types stand out:

- Mini Boards are short, light-weight boards (usually under 11kgs) destined for shorter distance travel and focused on portability. Can be fitted with an easily-detachable, sometimes under 99Wh (air travel safe) capacity battery pack.
- Street Boards or Flexy Boards (similar to the initial Boosted Board) are relatively light-weight boards usually fitted with street wheels (under 115mm diameter) and a flexible board. Most of them are fitted with a two-piece enclosure (battery and ESC) for better flexibility and have an average autonomy.
- AT (all-terrain) Boards or 2-in-1 Boards are a mix between Flexy Boards and Off-Roaders, having bigger wheels (115mm and above), and usually a single-piece battery and ESC enclosure with either a carbon-fibre or wooden deck. These boards are destined for urban environments but can also tackle grass, gravel and light off-roading. They are usually belt-drive dual motor systems better for swapping between different sizes and types of wheels (polyurethane, rubber, pneumatic).
- Off-Roaders are based on mountain board decks (eMTB) and are bigger, heavier boards specialized for tackling rough terrain and high inclines. They have at least a dual motor configuration (sometimes even quad motor 4x4) and have a top-mounted, box-type battery enclosure for better ground clearance. They can be fitted with specialized suspension, foot bindings and mud guards. Sometimes they have a metal chassis on top of which the deck is mounted.
- Racing Boards are specialized, high-performance boards that usually have a very low, stiff deck, wide-patch rubber wheels and are used for racing events. Some of these boards have a 3-link truck system which offers better stability during heavy acceleration and high speed. They are fitted with top-end ESCs that can sometimes output over 15KW of peak power. They usually have rear-mounted, dual motor configurations.
- Folding Skateboards are designed for easy travel.

== Design and operation ==
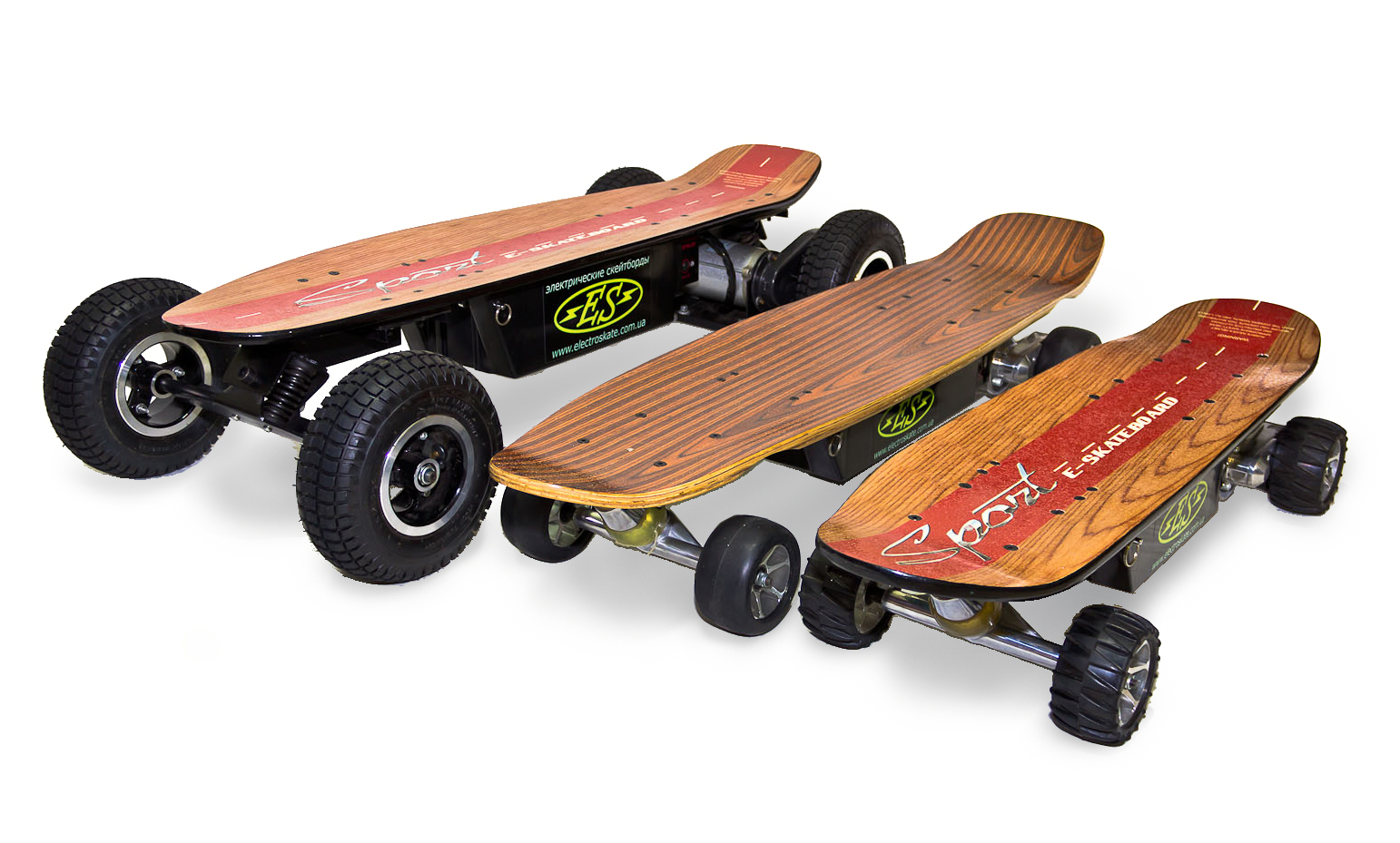
Electric skateboards of various sizes

The electric skateboard was originally designed for local transport, but later diversified for multiple uses, longer distance travel and off-road use. The off road models can easily handle gravel, grass, dirt and sand and can often be seen on the beach at low tide.

The basic design of an electric skateboard consists of an electric motor (out-runner or hub), batteries, speed controller (often the specially designed VESC), and a wireless throttle on top of a regular skateboard, longboard or other variant (e.g. penny board, mountain board).

=== Motor ===
Traction is typically provided by one or more of the following:

- Wheel hub motor – the motor is encased in a urethane or rubber 'sleeve' and acts as a wheel.
- Out-runner motors – the motor is mounted close to the wheel and linked with a toothed belt and pulleys. The pulley choice can be used to gear the drive system for desired torque and top speed.
- Direct drive motors - placed between the wheels and the trucks and connected directly to the wheels.

=== Board deck ===
Electric skateboards are able to travel at high speeds, as well as go off-road. Stability is determined by some key deck features:

- Length – Achieving high speed almost always requires the use of a longboard. The longer the deck, the more stable the skateboard.
- Wheelbase – The distance between the front truck and rear truck, with a longer wheelbase providing better weight distribution and stability at speed.
- Flexibility – affects the deck's ability to absorb shocks. Greater flexibility reduces stability, so downhill racers require stiffer decks.
- Material - The most common type of deck is multi-layer and made of wood. There are also decks with aluminum or steel chassis. Carbon-fibre decks were introduced later.
- Width - Boards with a wider base are more stable.
- Carbon-fiber - Used to make board decks waterproof.

=== Electronic speed controller ===
All electric skateboards need an electronic speed controller (ESC) in order to vary the speed of the motor for accelerating or braking. Originally, hobbyists would typically use ESCs from radio-controlled model cars, but the rise in popularity and interest in building electric skateboards created demand for bespoke and more sophisticated ESCs. The VESC (Variable Electronic Speed Controller) may include motor and battery protection, regenerative braking, programming options e.g. acceleration and deceleration curves, and other advanced features. Some boards include push-assist where the board senses traditional skateboard pushing and increases the strength or duration of the push.

=== Truck ===
Trucks are important and extremely durable parts that are mounted under the surface of the electric skateboard. They are part of a T-shaped metal body under the two ends of the skateboard which keeps the skateboard wheels and bearings attached to the deck. There are several types of trucks and truck systems, but the most commonly used are:

TKP (traditional king-pin) - usually found in skateboards.

RKP (reversed king-pin) - more stable and better for faster speeds, but with limited turning circle.

DKP (double king-pin) - more nimble and better turning circle but more unstable at higher speeds.

Channel trucks (also known as C-trucks or Chamber trucks) - wider, more complex trucks most commonly used for off-road applications.

3-link trucks - most commonly used in racing applications.

=== Drivetrains ===
There are several types of drivetrain for different uses, but four main types stand out:

Hub drive, using the wheel hub motor, is a system where the motor is inside the wheel and the motion is directly translated to the wheel. It is the most compact, lightweight, silent and efficient type of drivetrain but has less torque, is less comfortable to drive and the tire choices are usually limited. The motors are also more exposed to shocks, vibrations and water splashes.

Direct drive is similar to hub drive but the motors sit outside the wheel, inwards towards the truck, and are integrated in the truck assembly. The main advantage to hub drive is the flexibility in wheel and tire choice. The motor also is able to cool better, but in this case the motors are the most exposed to the elements, sitting as low to the ground as the difference between the motor radius and the wheel radius. These types of configurations are more oriented to street boards.

Belt drive is one of the most popular systems. It connects the motors and wheels via pulleys and belts. The pulleys offer flexibility for different gear ratios and the belts (usually HTD 5M type) are easy to replace. This system also offers the most flexibility in the positioning of the motors in relation to the truck, either under the board or in the back of the board. Belt drive essentially takes advantage of the high-revving electric motor, offering better acceleration and braking for the same amount of power as hub/direct drive systems. However, the maintenance of switching belts is higher than hub/direct drive motors. They are generally much louder than hub motors and direct drives, which can be problematic in cities where electric skateboards are legally questionable, as it becomes very obvious that the skateboard is motorized.

Gear drive is a system that connects the motors and wheels via toothed gears. These can be either enclosed or open. The enclosed variant of gear drive offers the same advantages as belt drive for less (almost no) maintenance, and is better suited for off-roading or environments with lots of debris (pebbles/rocks/twigs/grass) which could damage the belts. Disadvantages to belt drive are the added weight of the enclosure and the fixed gear ratio which can't be changed as easily.

The number of motors installed can also vary, the most popular configuration being dual motor (2 motors attached to the back truck). There are also 4 motors configuration (all-wheel drive) and single motor usually found in entry-level boards.

== Safety ==
Typical retail boards such as those from Evolve and Boosted are able to reach top speeds of around 20-25 mph (32–40 km/h) on their fastest modes, while specialist and hobbyist boards can be built with very powerful motors for top speeds of 50 mph (80 km/h) and beyond. Braking is typically implemented as Dynamic braking or regenerative braking from the rear wheels only and the stopping distance can vary widely between motors and wheels/tires.

Electric skateboard rules and laws are controversial. Experts argue if they should be categorized with e-bikes or regular skateboards, should they be allowed on bike lanes or sidewalks, and should speed limits be enforced.

There have been several fatal accidents involving electric skateboards and many accounts of hospital visits. Motorcycle armor including helmet, knee, elbow and wrist pads are recommended for high speed riding.

Data collected by doctors from 2018-2022 and published in the National Electronic Injury Surveillance System compared injuries in traditional skateboards to electric skateboards. They concluded that there are more hospitalizations and multiple fractures from one accident connected to electric skateboards.

== Benefits and problems ==
Electric skateboards offer several advantages and problems. One of their primary benefits is that they are environmentally friendly and produces zero emissions and contributes to less urban pollution. They also provide a convenient and economical means of transportation within cities, helping users save on expenses related to parking, ride-sharing services, public transit, and car ownership.

However, electric skateboards also present many problems. Their batteries often require several hours to fully charge, which can limit their practicality for frequent use. They are typically unregistered and uninsured which makes it difficult to identify riders who violate traffic regulations or to address liability issues when accidents involving pedestrians occur.

== See also ==
- Personal transporter#Use and regulation by country
- Self-balancing scooter
- Skateboarding
- E-scooter
- Electric unicycle
