= Brakeboard =

Skateboard with braking mechanism

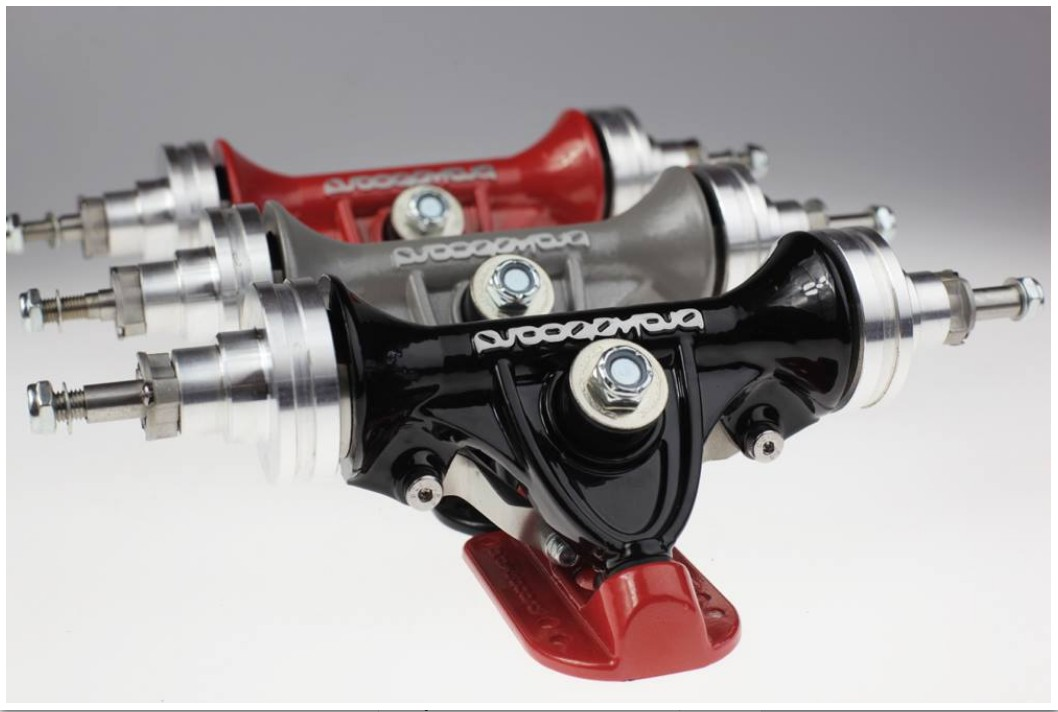
Brakeboard truck sets (2013–2015)

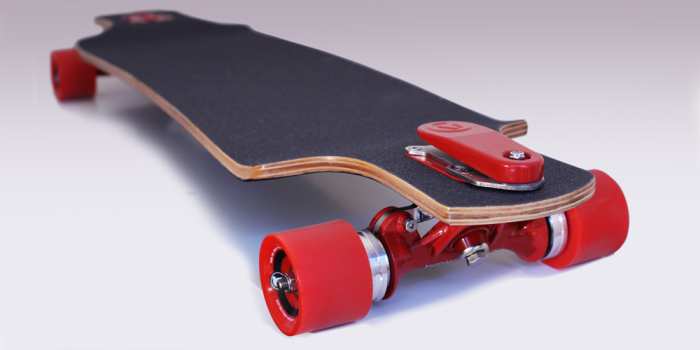
A complete and assembled Brakeboard (2013–2015)

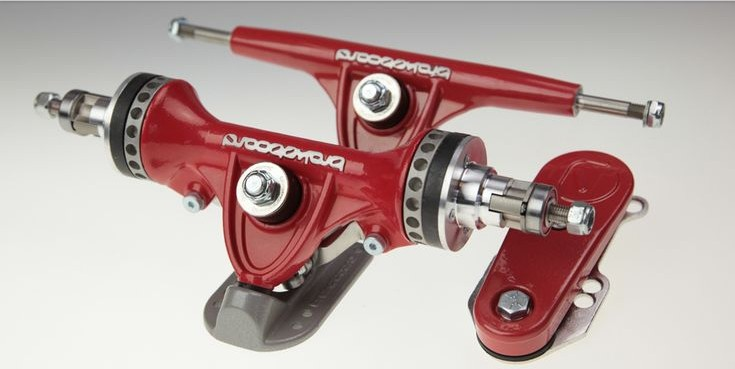
Brakeboard 3.1 (April 2015–)

A brakeboard is a skateboard fitted with a specialised truck assembly that includes a braking mechanism.

== History ==
The Brakeboard was first invented in 1999 by Ben Newman of Western Australia. From 2001 the first version was manufactured and sold worldwide. In 2010 the Australian Government provided an R&D grant which enabled the development of a new iteration which was released in Melbourne in January 2013.

== Features ==
The cone brakes, contained within the rear axle assembly or truck, can be attached to the rear of any skateboard deck. It is however, intended mainly for longboards. It is activated by a foot pedal located on the surface of the board. The brake allows the rider to control their speed on a downhill run and bring the board to a safe stop.

A patent has been granted in the USA. Brakeboard’s trade name is registered with Australian and US authorities.

== Awards ==
The original Brakeboard by Ben Newman was Western Australian winner and national finalist in the Yellow Pages Business Ideas Award in 2001 and a sector winner on the Australian Broadcasting Corporation’s The New Inventors program 2006 Newman was also a runner-up to the winner of the inaugural WA Inventor of the Year competition in 2006, though there was some controversy about the eligibility of award applications.
