= Electric board =

Electric board may refer to:

- Electricity board, which governs one or more electric utilities
- Electric skateboard
