= MotoBoard =

Motorised skateboard

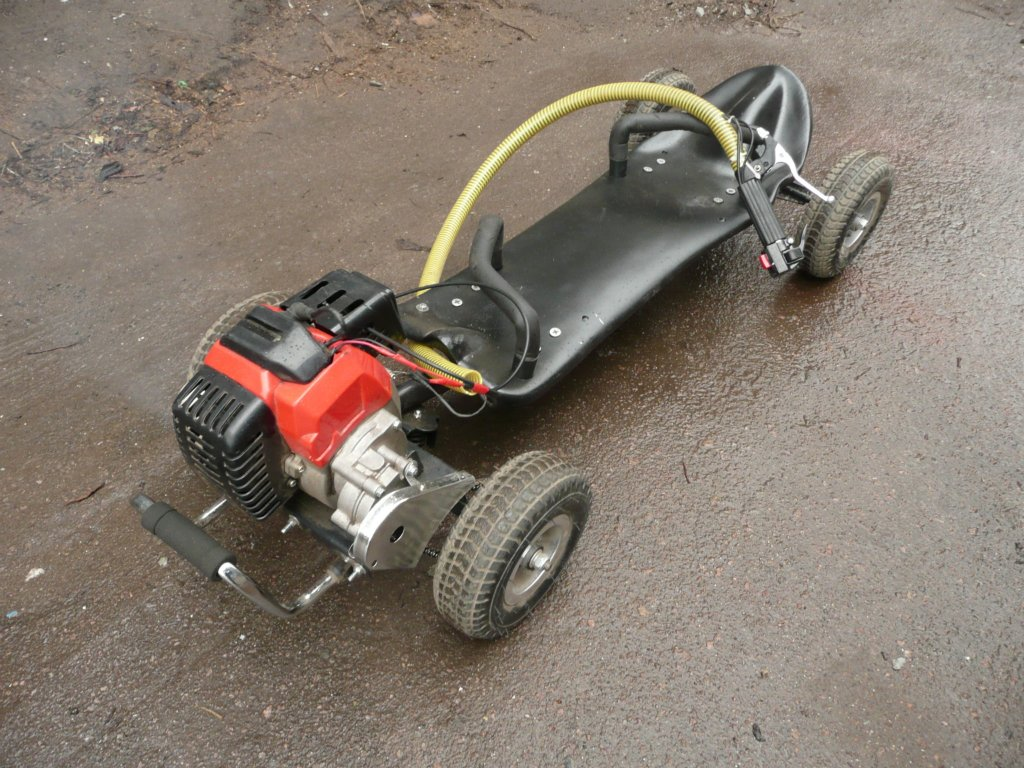
A MotoBoard, made in China in the 2010s

MotoBoard was a mass-produced motorized skateboard, made possible by the advent in the mid-1970s of polyurethane skate wheels, as well as the production of lightweight small industrial two-stroke engines (typical of today's string trimmers).

== History ==
Shortly after urethane wheels became available, Jim Rugroden, a student in Berkeley, California, designed and built the first MotoBoard in the garage of his brother's home in the South San Francisco Bay Area town of Campbell while on break from his physics studies in summer 1975. The MotoBoard evolved from a simple push start prototype, to a precision automatic shaft-driven sport vehicle.

During a photo shoot for Skateboarder Magazine in Carlsbad, California, near San Diego, Rugroden met Bill Posey, an onlooking entrepreneur, and they eventually teamed-up to form Quantimotion, Inc., DBA MotoBoard International.

Originally, MotoBoard Intl. operated from both a small northern California shop in Sunnyvale, where Rugroden manufactured the units, and Posey's established southern California office in Carlsbad, where much of the promotion and sales were generated. In 1979 the company was consolidated in a new, much larger facility in the newly established Foreign Trade Zone complex in San Jose, California.

== Sales ==
MotoBoard sales were mostly through upper-end retail outlets and order catalogs such as Abercrombie & Fitch, Sports Pages, Hammacher Schlemmer and Bromley. Motoboards were often featured in widely distributed periodicals such as Playboy, High Times, Time magazine, and center-staged in Road & Track magazine in 1978 as April's road tested vehicle of the month.

== Users ==
Few MotoBoard buyers were avid skateboarders, as the eventual $650.00 sticker was generally not within reach of the average skateboarder. MotoBoards did well in the movie industry. MotoBoards were featured in Hooper with Burt Reynolds, Coming Attractions, Skateboarders from Hell, the TV series Max Headroom and The San Pedro Beach Bums. Appearances on The Price Is Right were frequent, and MotoBoard was spotlighted as McLean Stevenson (M*A*S*H) rode in on stage introducing his short lived variety show America, featuring Michael J. Fox as premier guest in the wake of his Back to the Future box office hit.

== Current production ==
MotoBoards were produced and sold worldwide until Posey and Rugroden parted ways in 1983. MotoBoards are still produced to this day by a firm in Los Banos, California in limited quantities under the assumed name MotoBoard Int'l.

== See also ==
- Electric skateboard
- Onewheel
