= Boosted (company) =

US electric skateboards manufacturer

- Formerly: Boosted Boards
- Company type: Private
- Industry: Manufacturing
- Founded: 2012; 14 years ago, Palo Alto, California, United States
- Founders: John Ulmen, Sanjay Dastoor, Matthew Tran
- Defunct: 2020
- Fate: Most of assets sold to Boosted USA
- Headquarters: Mountain View, California 94043, United States
- Key people: Jeff Russakow (CEO)
- Products: Electric skateboards, electric scooters

Boosted (formerly Boosted Boards) was an American manufacturer of electric skateboards and electric scooters based in Mountain View, California.

== History ==
=== 2012–2016 ===
Boosted was founded in mid-2012 with financial backing by StartX. The company was founded by Sanjay Dastoor, John Ulmen, and Matthew Tran, who delivered a TED talk on the subject in 2013.

The company started a Kickstarter campaign promising a premium electric skateboard called the "Boosted Board" for a $100,000 goal. It was a massive success, and generated over $467,000 from backers.

In 2014, the original Boosted Board was renamed the Dual+, and two new models were announced: the Dual and the Single. The Dual and Single received new, upgraded software. The Dual+ also received the software following the announcement.

On May 19, 2016, the second generation Boosted Board was announced. It featured a swappable battery that could be upgraded to a future Extended Range Battery, water resistance, 80 mm Orangatang wheels, upgraded Bluetooth radio, accessory ports beneath the risers, and more modular design to better enable service and repair by both users and the manufacturer. However, the Single model was cancelled and store credits to reservation holders to upgrade to Dual and Dual+ models.

=== 2017–2018 ===
In February 2017, the second generation was re-released with additional upgrades to its battery and firmware. In November 2017, an expanded version of the Boosted mobile app was released, including expansion from just iOS to also include Android. In January 2018 the Extended Range Battery was released, which is able to be mounted on second generation boards, effectively doubling the range of skateboard. On April 17, 2018, Boosted announced its third generation of skateboards. It included two longboards, and for the first time, two shortboards. The company also expanded at this time from shipping in US and Canada to 34 countries, including the EU, Australia, and New Zealand. Time magazine named the Boosted Mini a Top 50 Invention of the Year. In December 2018, Boosted received over $60 million in new investment to continue its global expansion and development of additional products.

=== 2019 ===
Boosted announced the new Boosted Rev (scooter) on May 15, 2019.

Boosted announced the new Boosted Beams (dedicated headlights) and Boosted 105's (larger wheels) on November 14, 2019.

=== 2020 ===
The Boosted Rev, being manufactured in China, was affected by the US-China tariff war, causing the company to owe its manufactures up to $100,000 during production.

On March 4, 2020, Boosted announced that it has laid off a significant portion of its team and was actively seeking a buyer.

In April 2020, it was reported that Lime has acquired some of the remaining assets of Boosted, including five of the company's core patents. The remaining inventory of skateboards, scooters, and related parts was acquired by Boosted USA.

== Products ==
=== Kickstarter Boosted Boards ===
The first Boosted Boards were offered in a Kickstarter running from September 11, 2012 to October 11, 2012, collecting $467,167 with 1,110 backers. The first boards shipped in February 2014.

=== First gen Boosted Boards ===
The official Boosted line-up was launched November 5, 2014 and consisted of three models.

| | Boosted Single | Boosted Dual | Boosted Dual+ |
|---|---|---|---|
| Motors | One | Two | |
| Top speed | 18 mph | 20 mph | 22 mph |
| Power | 1000 watt | 1500 watt | 2000 watt |
| Range | 10 miles (16 km) | 7 miles (11 km) | 7 miles (11 km) |
| Hill climbing | 15% grade | 20% grade | 25% grade |
| Wheel Size | Orangatang In Heat 75mm | | |
| Deck length | 38.0" (96,5 cm) | | |

=== Second gen Boosted Boards ===
The second generation boards were announced on May 19, 2016. The second generation features an upgrade to the electronics and drive train of the board. New boards featured modular components such as the motors, skid plates, ESC, and battery. Second generation was also launched with two battery sizes, the 99 watt-hour SR battery and the 199 watt-hour XR battery. Originally announced with a single motor variant, the 2nd generation later discontinued development of this board due to an XR battery recall and subsequent shipping delays.

| | Boosted Dual SR | Boosted Dual XR | Boosted Dual+ SR | Boosted Dual+ XR |
|---|---|---|---|---|
| Motors | Two | | | |
| Top speed | 20 mph | | 22 mph | |
| Ride modes | 3 | | 4 | |
| Power | 1500 watt | | 2000 watt | |
| Range | 7 miles (11 km) | 14 miles (22 km) | 7 miles (11 km) | 14 miles (22 km) |
| Recharge time | 75 min | 105 min | 75 min | 105 min |
| Hill climbing | 20% grade | | 25% grade | |
| Wheel Size | Orangatang Kegel 80mm | | | |
| Deck length | 38.0" (96,5 cm) | | | |
| Weight | 15.0 lbs (6,8 kg) | 16.8 lbs (7,6 kg) | 15.0 lbs (6,8 kg) | 16.8 lbs (7,6 kg) |

=== Third gen Boosted Boards ===
The third generation Boosted Boards were introduced on April 17, 2018. The line exists of four models, with the Boosted Mini, a smaller electric skateboard. The major difference between 2nd gen and 3rd gen boards comes with their construction, as they now only use in house Boosted components (deck, wheels, trucks).

| | Boosted Stealth | Boosted Plus | Boosted Mini X | Boosted Mini S |
|---|---|---|---|---|
| Top speed | 24 mph (38 km/h) | 22 mph (35 km/h) | 20 mph (32 km/h) | 18 mph (29 km/h) |
| Ride modes | 5 | 4 | 3 | |
| Power | 2100 watt | 2000 watt | 1000 watt | |
| Range | 14 miles (22 km) | | | 7 miles (11 km) |
| Recharge time | 105 min | | | 75 min |
| Hill climbing | 25% grade | | 20% grade | |
| Wheels | Boosted Stratus 85mm | | Boosted Lunar 80mm | |
| Deck length | 38.0" (96,5 cm) | | 29.5" (75,0 cm) | |
| Weight | 17.0 lbs (7,7 kg) | | 16.8 lbs (7,6 kg) | 15.0 lbs (6,8 kg) |

=== Boosted Rev electric scooter ===
| | Boosted Rev |
|---|---|
| Motors | Two (all wheel drive) |
| Top speed | 24 mph (38 km/h) |
| Ride modes | 3 |
| Power | 1500W (nominal) |
| Range | 8-16 mile Real world Range depending on user weight and mode used |
| Hill climbing | 25% grade |
