= Penny board =

Type of skateboard

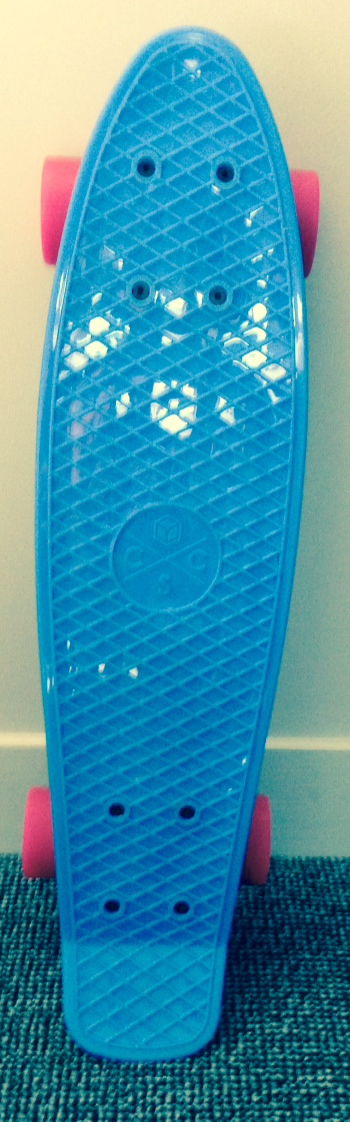
- A blue penny board
- Type: Skateboard
- Inventor: Ben Mackay
- Inception: 2010
- Manufacturer: Penny Skateboards

A Penny board is a type of skateboard that is characterized by a short and narrow plastic deck. Although such skateboards were first manufactured during the 1970s, their name and contemporary popularity come from the Australian brand Penny Skateboards, founded in 2010. The company's name has since been widely genericized to describe all small plastic skateboards.

== History ==
The first line of plastic skateboards was launched in the 1970s by Larry Stevenson for his Makaha brand. Greentech also began to manufacture plastic skateboards. These plastic skateboards were widely popular during the early 1970s, although the era's professional skaters still shunned them in favor of wooden boards. By 1978, laminated wooden decks had become the industry standard.

Ben Mackay created the Penny board in 2010, from which the brand Penny Skateboards was born. MacKay named the brand for his sister, Penny. The idea behind the creation of the company was inspired by Mackay's first-ever skateboard, a small plastic cruiser that his father bought for him at a garage sale.

Ben Mackay first started manufacturing and designing his own skateboards to sell to local skate shops. Mackay began experimenting with different shapes and types of boards. He used a variety of materials, such as fiberglass and carbon inserts, as an alternative to timber.

By 2015, the Absolute Board Company was providing 36% of the market of boards under 34 inches.

== Characteristics ==
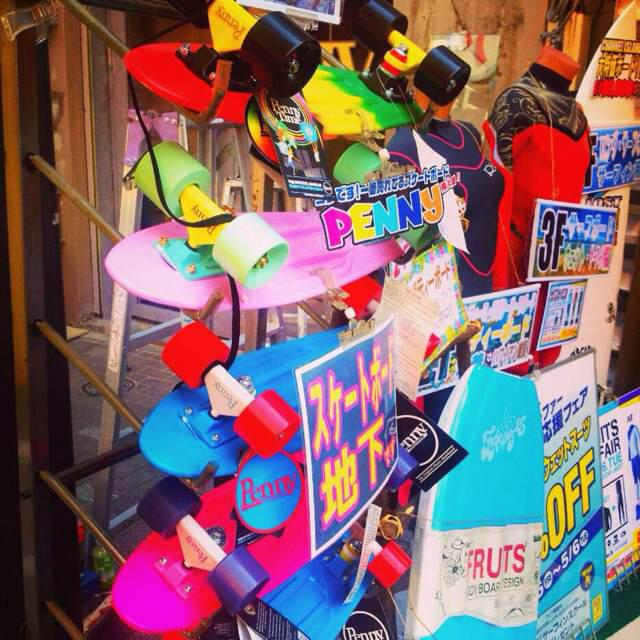
Penny skateboards on sale at a shop in Shibuya, Tokyo.

Penny boards are distinguished by a plastic deck. Different parts of the Penny board structure are available in a variety of colors and designs. They are sold in five different deck sizes: The 22 in (55.9 cm) Penny, 27 in (68.6 cm) Nickel, 29 in (73.7 cm) Surf Skate, 32 in (81.3 cm) Cruiser, and 36 in (91.4 cm) Longboard. Customers can also buy each component of the board individually.

- Deck: Penny skateboard decks are made of plastic (polycarbonate) and feature a non-slip "waffle top" texture.
- Grip tape: Grip tape is offered for 22" and 27" models.
- Trucks: Penny trucks are made from cast aluminum.
- Wheels: Penny board wheels are made from Polyurethane, with a plastic core. The wheels on 22-inch (55.9 cm) and 27-inch (68.6 cm) Penny boards have a diameter of 59 mm (2.323 inches), while Penny longboard wheels have a larger diameter of 69 mm (2.717 inches). All Penny wheels are rated at 83A.

The Nickel skateboard is five inches larger than the Penny board and is suited for beginners because of its larger deck, but still remains lightweight due to its plastic design. Both the Penny board and the Nickel board are lighter than a regular wooden skateboard.

== Reviews ==
The Skater Oscar Candon complained that, "you can’t even ollie up a curb" with a Penny board. According to the skateboarding historian Craig Snyder, plastic is not a popular board component among the skateboarding community.
