= Longboard (skateboard) =

Type of sports equipment similar to skateboard

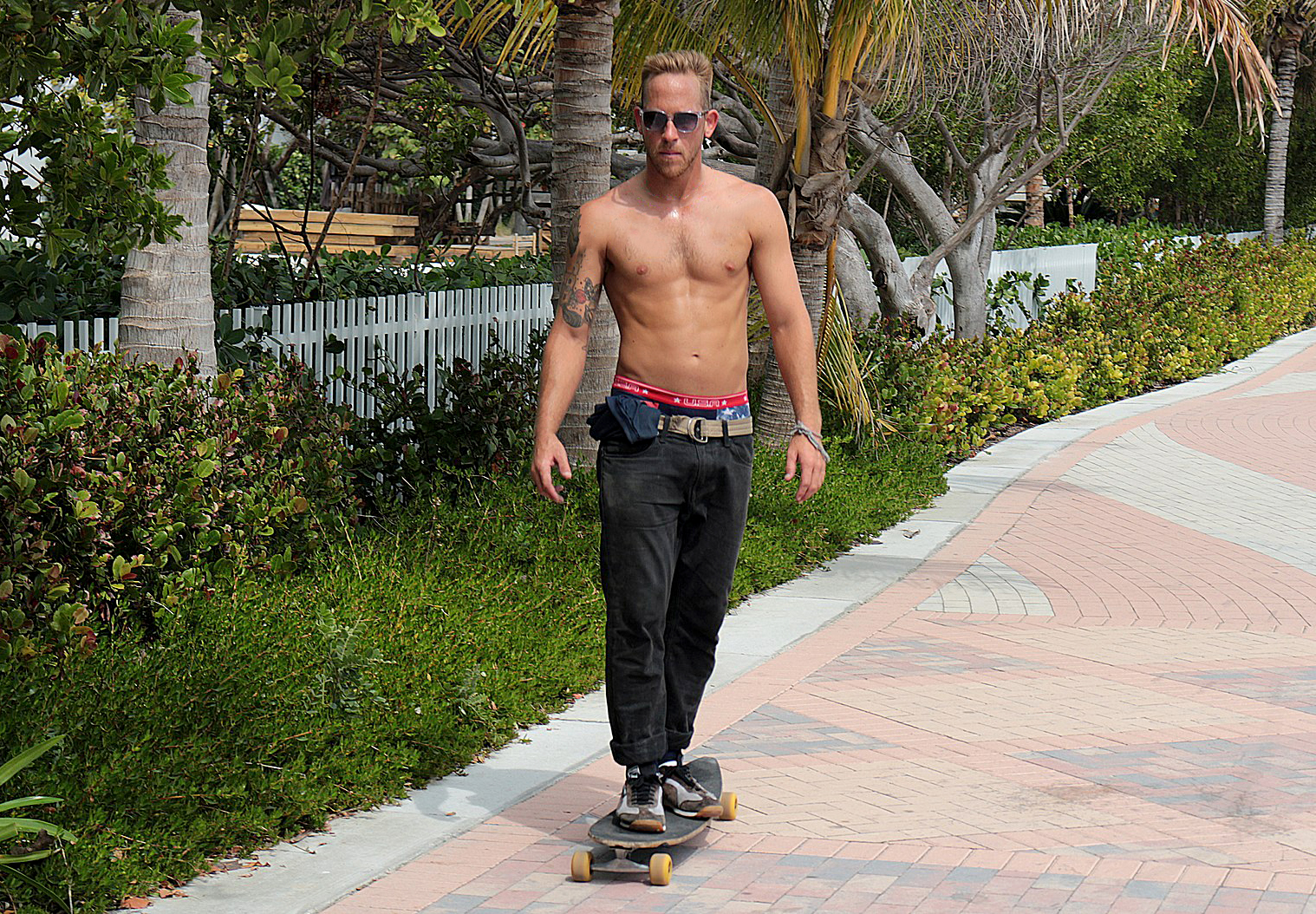
Longboarder

A longboard is a type of skateboard typified by longer decks and wheelbases, larger-diameter and softer (lower-durometer) wheels, and often lower riding height compared to street skateboards, though there is wide variation in the geometry and construction of longboards. Among the earliest types of skateboards, longboards were inspired by surfing, with early longboards drawing from the design of surfboards, resembling and mimicking the motion of riding a surfboard, but adapted to riding on streets in a practice known as sidewalk surfing.

Available in a wide variety of shapes, longboards are typically designed and optimized for cruising (covering distances at moderate speeds), commuting (as a practical means of personal transport), and downhill (racing). The act of riding on a longboard in general is known as longboarding, which can also include more specialized forms such as longboard dancing, which involves stepping up and down a board and other movements and motions performed on the board while riding, and freestyle, which can encompass trick skating and executing tricks often associated with street skateboards.

== History ==
The first longboards were made by Preston Nichols in the 1940s and 1950s as an alternative to surfing when the waves were too dull. Early skaters built dangerous, improvised boards out of planks of wood and roller skates. Manufactured longboards first became commercially available in 1959 when Makaha, Jack's, and Hobie became the first professional longboard distributors. These early longboards were still relatively crude, as they still featured metal wheels, but later had clay wheels due to improved safety factors. Longboarding became a popular activity in the late 1950s and early 1960s, but its popularity had largely died by 1965. Longboarding made a comeback in 1972 when Frank Nasworthy and the Cadillac Wheel Company introduced the urethane longboard wheel. Urethane wheels allowed skaters to reach very high downhill speeds which were not possible before. The introduction of reverse kingpins (RKP) also improved stability for riders. The exact inventor of reverse kingpins is unknown, however both Randal and Variflex had reverse kingpin trucks advertised and featured in Skateboarder magazine in 1979. The reverse kingpin truck improved stability and suppleness which helped downhill longboarding grow into a legitimate sport, with the International Gravity Sports Association (IGSA) as its governing body. The 90's also saw the introduction of the cutout deck, which has sections cut out around the wheels to prevent the wheels from touching the board during hard turns. Longboard technology has evolved rapidly to accommodate unique modern skating disciplines including downhill, slalom, freeriding, dancing, and freestyle. Modern longboard decks can be made from a variety of materials including fiberglass composites, aluminum, and carbon fiber. Precision trucks, which are machined with cutting edge CNC technology instead of die casting with molds, offer more strength and maneuverability than cast trucks and have achieved popularity among professional skaters.

== Dimensions ==
Most boards measure 84 to 150 centimeters (33 to 59 in) in length while widths vary from 22.8 to 25.4 cm (9.0 to 10.0 in). There are several longboard shapes, such as pintails, swallowtails, flat-nose riders, drop-through decks, drop decks and boards with the same shape as a conventional skateboard. Pintails permit looser trucks and larger wheels which are better suited for carving or a "smooth" feel, whereas drop decks and drop throughs allow the rider to be closer to the ground, hence a lower center of gravity which increases stability and allows these boards to support more high speed downhill riding disciplines. Mid-length boards, 94 to 127 cm (37 to 50 in) are the most versatile. Their greater weight and bulk makes them less suitable for many skateboarding tricks, but contributes to a fluid motion by providing more momentum. The longboard's design allows for big turns or quick short carves similar to the motions of surfers or snowboarders. Longboards have 3 axes: the tail axis (running from tail to tail), the central axis (running straight down through the center of the board), and the short axis (running from the width of the board and perpendicular to the tail axis).

== Equipment and protection ==
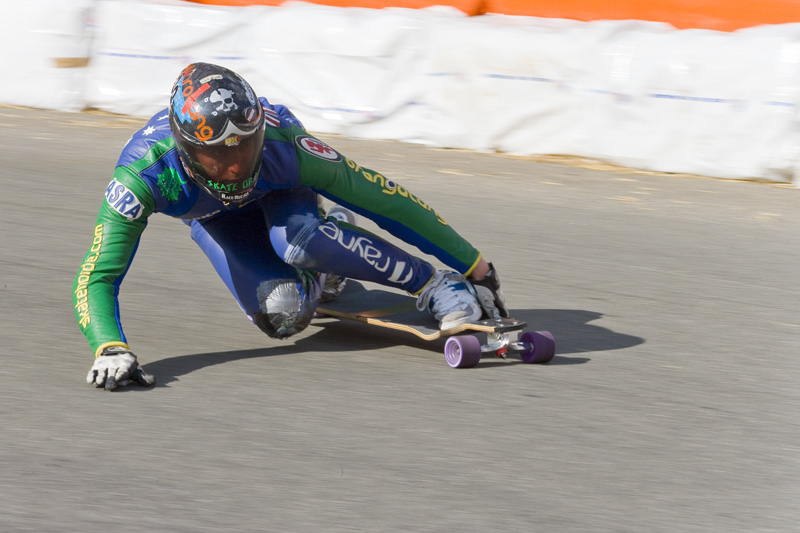
Protective equipment

The ‘helmet culture’ is more prevalent in longboarding than in conventional skateboarding. Most riders wear protective equipment in all disciplines, and nearly all professionals wear a helmet and gloves. Longboard protective equipment is similar to standard skateboard equipment, with the exception of slide gloves. Most longboarders wear slide gloves and helmets, as these are considered the bare minimum for protection. Additional protection includes leathers, wrist guards, knee pads, elbow pads and sometimes spine protectors and padded shorts. Many professional longboarding teams and riders are required to wear and advocate all aspects of protection. In the sliding and downhill disciplines, riders wear "slide gloves" which are specialized gloves made out of strong materials such as leather and synthetic fabrics, and have large discs called "pucks" attached to the palms. These are attached to protect the hands as the rider uses them to pivot during slides along the ground. The pucks are usually made of synthetic polymers: delrin, UHMW, or corian.

== Components ==
Longboards are very similar to conventional skateboards in terms of parts and general construction. Aside from the harder wheels of those made for sliding, they generally have larger dimensions, their trucks have tailored designs and proportions and their wheels are usually larger and softer. As a result, riding the specialized longboard feels quite different from the conventional skateboard.

=== Decks ===
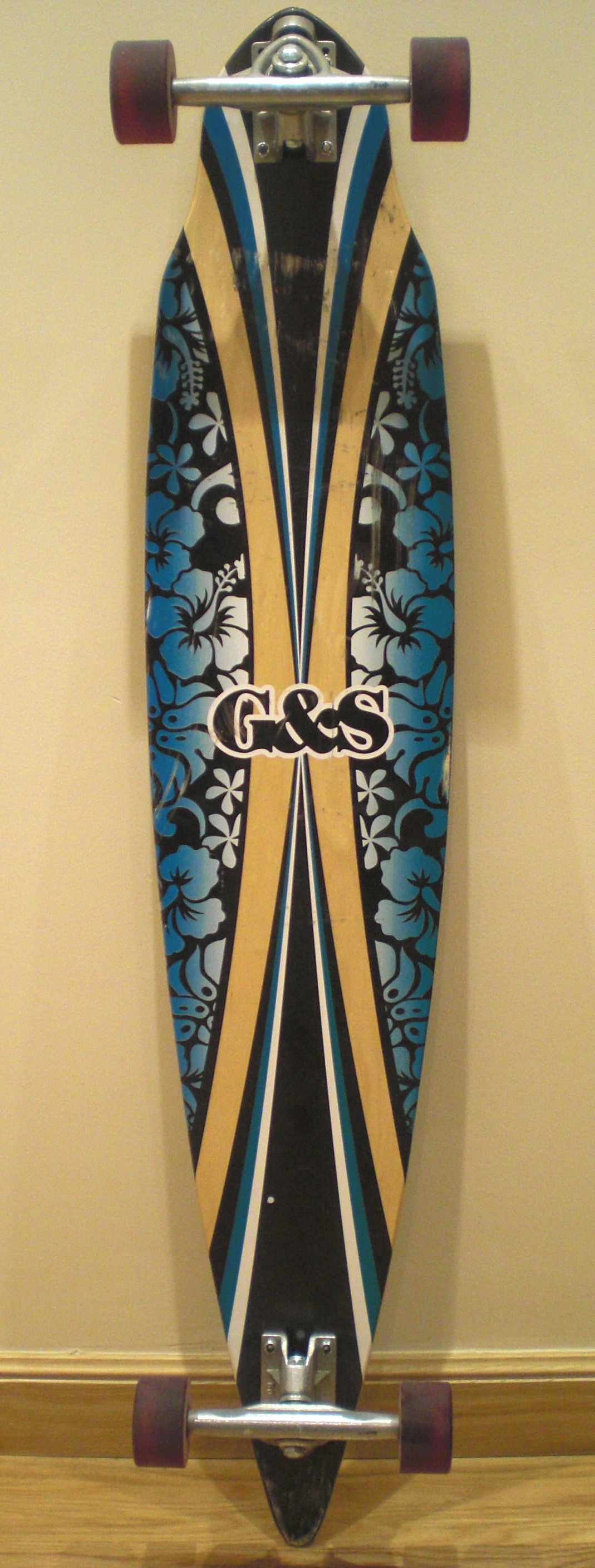
A 44-inch (110 cm) pintail shaped deck

Longboard decks are typically made from plywood: anywhere from two to eleven layers, each of usually 2 millimeters (0.079 in) in thickness, composed of birch, bamboo, maple, koa, or oak wood. Longboards are commercially available in a variety of shapes and sizes. Each variety has certain advantages and disadvantages, which come into play depending on the technique or personal preferences of the rider.

Decks intended for riding downhill are typically stiff and have a wheelbase of around 76–71 centimeters (30–28 in). Designers and manufacturers aim to make these boards as stiff and light as possible. The primary three designs of downhill boards are "drop decks", "top mounts" and "drop throughs". Each design has its own advantages.

The "drop deck" has a lowered foot platform that sits below the height of the trucks, as a result, there is a lower center of gravity which adds to stability but gives less traction and maneuverability. Wooden drop decks are concave and have foot pockets by the drops. However, some carbon fiber boards feature concavity by the drops instead of foot pockets giving more leverage while turning.

The "drop through" design has cutouts that allow the base-plate of the truck to protrude through the board, thus lowering the deck and providing more stability. In addition to this, drop through decks decrease grip, as the deck is closer to the axle and moment arm of the wheel. There is also less leverage on the truck, which makes turning negligibly more difficult.

"Top mount" boards are the simplest design of the three. There are no dramatic bends aside from the foot concave. The board sits on top of the trucks as it would in a street skateboard. Advantages to this design include increased grip and ease of turning; disadvantages include a high center of gravity, which could contribute to a lack of stability.

There are many variations of the aforementioned designs, including a "double-drop" board, which incorporates both a drop through and drop down pattern. These are preferable for "freeride" as they are extremely low to the ground, which allows for ease of sliding. Footspace is important because there must be enough room on the board for the rider to form an aerodynamic "tuck". Downhill boards are made as stiff as possible to minimize the amount of energy stored in the deck in order to mitigate wobbling of the board at high speed (known as "speed wobbles").

Some boards are designed to be flexible. Flexible boards are usually intended for lower speed riding because when going faster, a flexible board can have torsional flex which is one cause of speed wobbles. Fiberglass is used in many new flexible boards as it is light like carbon fiber but more pliable.

Longboard decks can be shaped in such a way that they bow up or down along the length of the board. They can also have a downward bend along the width of the board. Concave boards, which bend upward on the sides, give the rider more friction for their toe and heel, thus giving them more control. A camber board is a gradual upward arch along the length of the board. This sets the center of the board above the truck mounts. This is often used on flexible boards to prevent the board from sagging when it is being ridden. A "rocker" shape is the opposite of camber, which sets the center of the board below the truck mounts when it is being ridden. This lets the rider more easily perform tricks like sliding by locking their feet into the board.

Decks recently have been made using materials other than wood. The types and quality of woods have increased over time and now many other "superior" materials have come into use. Aluminum, carbon fiber and fiberglass are just some of the new materials. Carbon fiber and fiberglass are used to strengthen or completely replace wood in decks because of their better strength to weight ratios. Some boards are pure carbon fiber with a foam core, these can weigh much less than boards of equal size. Aluminum decks are CNC cut out of sheets of aluminum and incredible shapes can be made. Bamboo is another popular material for constructing longboards because of its flexible and responsive properties.

==== Fishtail ====
The fishtail or pintail's shape is used to prevent the wheel from coming in contact with the board (called "wheelbite") while still providing ample foot space. Fishtails are most commonly used with top mounted trucks. They are also good cruising boards.

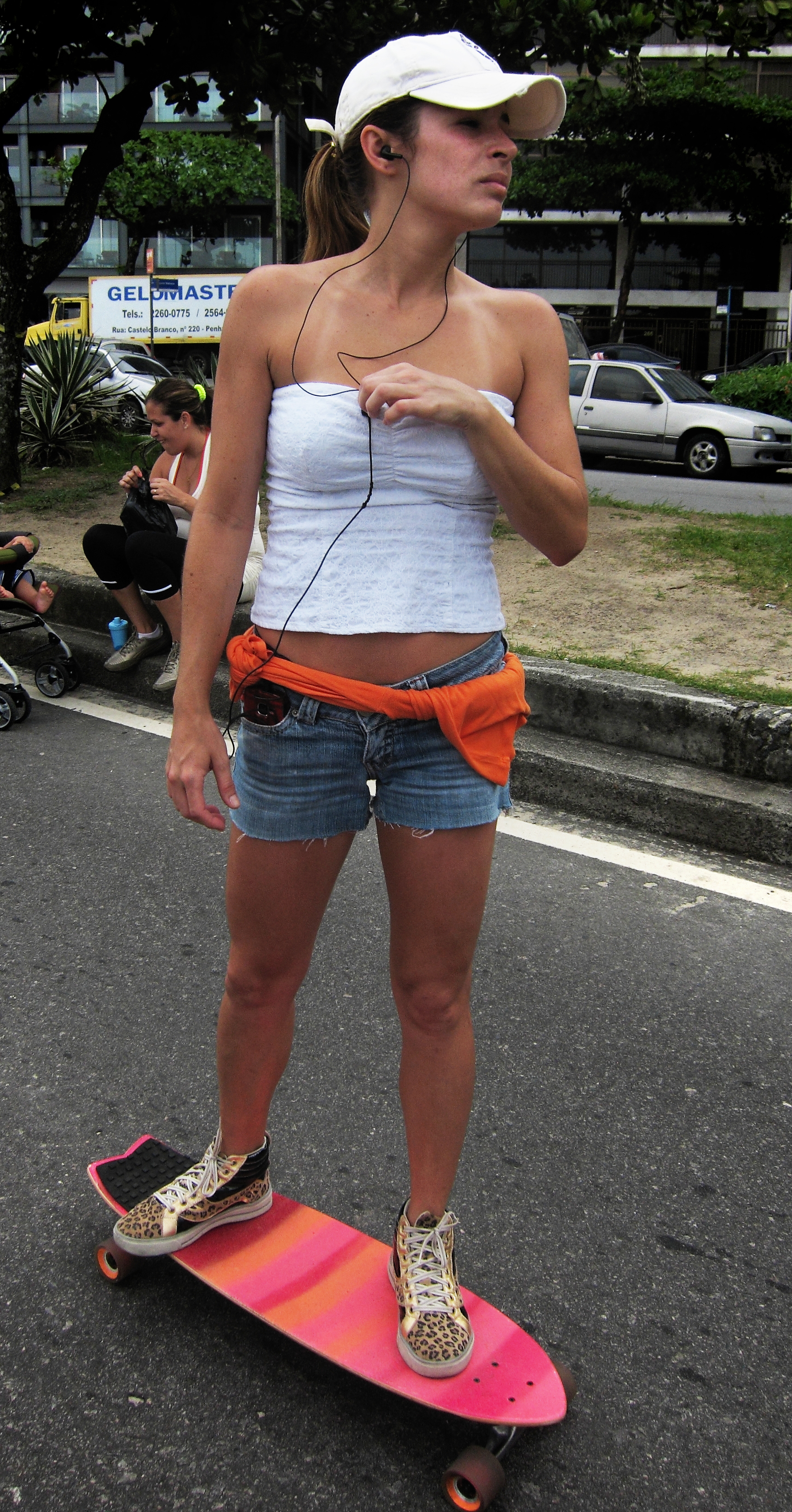
Fishtail

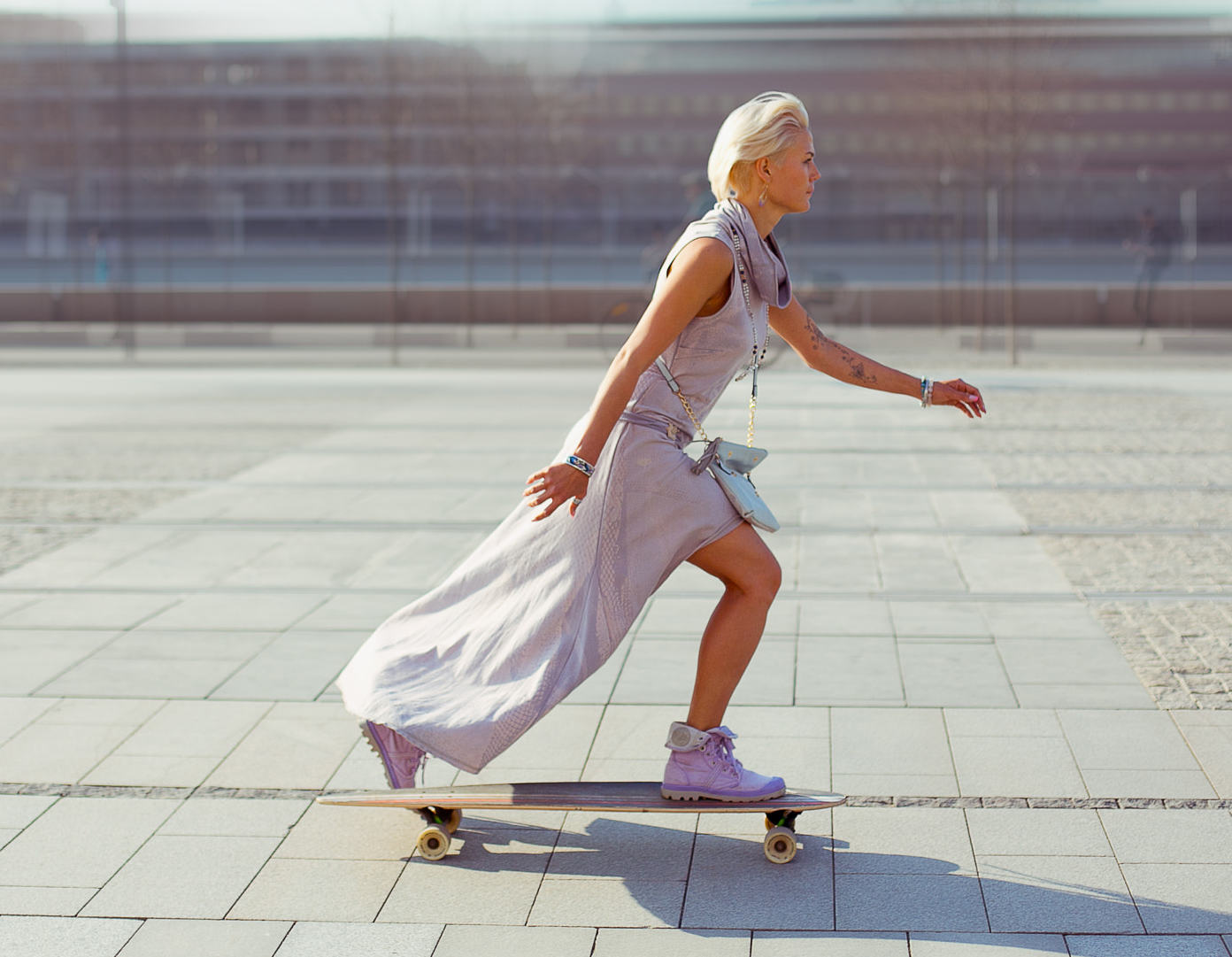
Pintail

==== Drop-Through ====
Drop-Through boards, not to be confused with a double drop deck, have a cutout in the deck, allowing the baseplates of the trucks to be mounted through the deck. The lowered platform allows for a lower center of gravity, more control while sliding, and greater stability at high speeds.

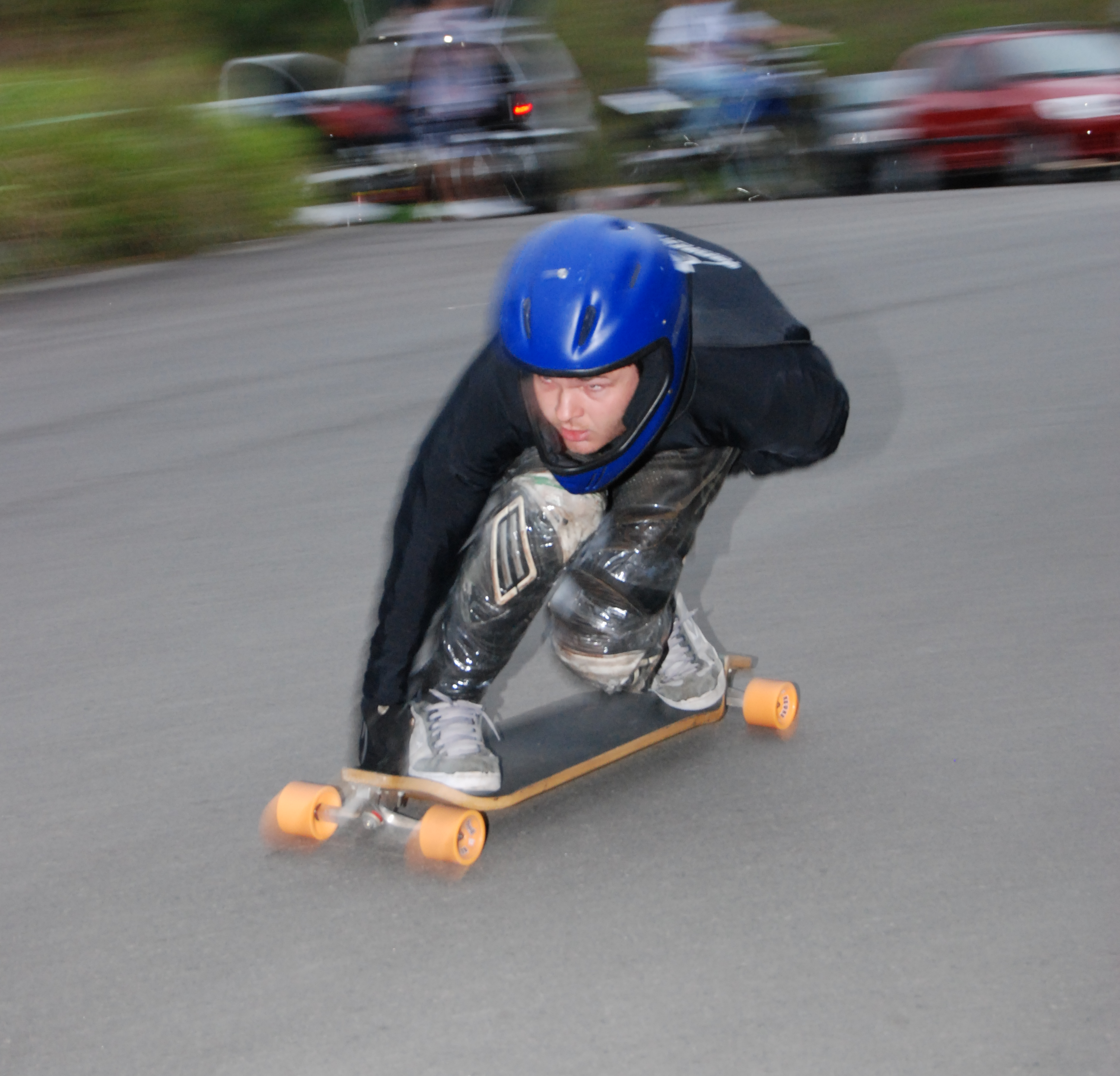
Drop-through

==== Hybrid ====
These kind of longboards include wheel cutouts which provide room for the wheels to turn at sharper angles while avoiding wheelbite. Hybrids also tend to be shorter than other longboards, which promotes maneuverability.

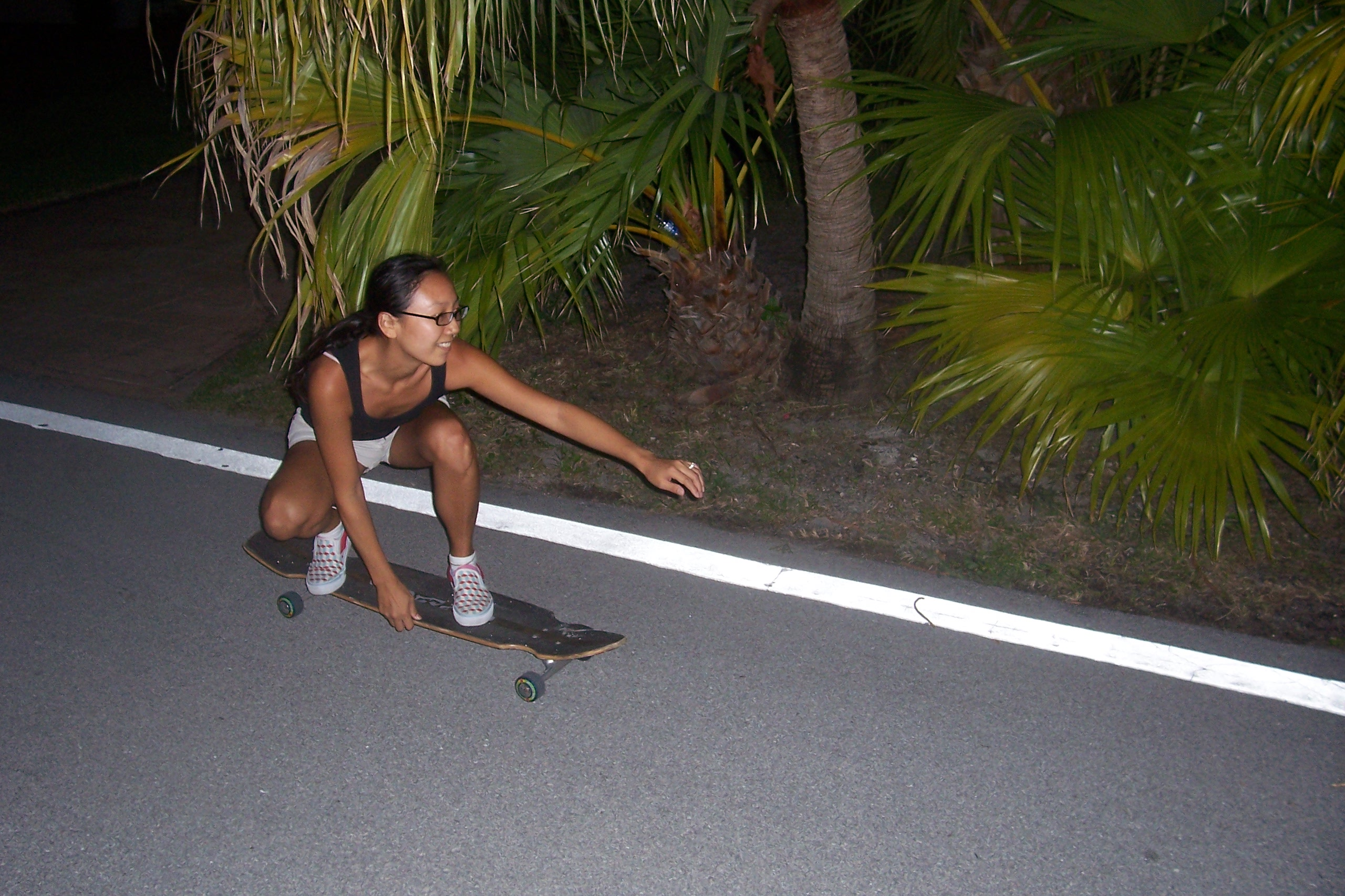
Hybrid longboard

==== Cruiser ====
A most common deck shape, these have a somewhat similar shape to normal skateboards, in that they have a "kick-tail" on the back. The main difference is it has trucks that are higher than standard skateboard trucks. Also, the wheels may be larger and are much softer than standard skateboard wheels. The bushings are much more flexible, giving the rider the ability to turn (carve) and maneuver more efficiently. These boards are more likely to cause "wheel-bite".

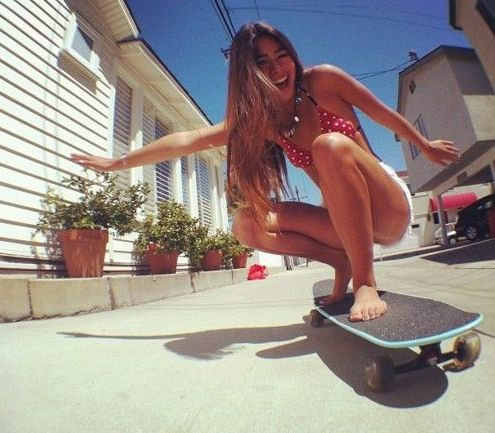
Cruiser

=== Trucks ===
Trucks are the metal turning mechanism that attach the longboard wheels to the deck. They come in a wide range of styles, with wider trucks meaning a wider turning circle. They use the motion of the rider's feet and body to turn the board by pivoting a joint in the middle of the truck. There are generally two types of trucks used on longboards: reverse kingpin trucks and conventional skateboard trucks (vertical kingpin). Conventional skateboard trucks have the kingpin on the inner side (towards the center of the board) of the axle, whereas reverse kingpin trucks have the kingpin on the outer side (towards the nose and tail) of the axle.

Popular conventional skateboard trucks include Independent and Tracker. Popular reverse kingpin trucks include Randal and Paris. Reverse kingpin trucks were created with longboarding in mind. While they are usually considered to have more grip and stability (two important things in the downhill discipline), conventional trucks have a very different feel that is often preferred by many longboarders.

The angle of the baseplate can also greatly influence the turning and stability of a truck. As a general rule, as the degree gets smaller, the truck will be more stable, but turn less (its turn essentially becomes more vertically oriented rather than horizontally oriented). For example, trucks with 44 degree baseplates will generally be more stable (turn less) than trucks with 50 degree baseplates.

=== Bushings ===
Bushings are perhaps the easiest things to change on a truck in order to change the feel of how it turns. Bushings are usually made of a polyurethane material, and come in varying shapes and durometers (hardness). Two of the most standard bushing shapes include barrels and cones. Barrels, having a larger shape, are often thought to have more stability and rebound whereas cones, having a more narrow shape, allow for more turn and less rebound. The durometer of the bushing also greatly influences its characteristics. a harder bushing (such as a bushing with a rating around 97A) will be much harder to turn on than a softer bushing (something around 78A). The type of washers used with the bushing can also greatly affect the bushing's characteristics. While it depends on the size of the washer, generally a cupped washer will be the most restrictive on a bushing, a flat washer will be neutral, and a flipped cup washer will be the least restrictive. Another aspect of the longboard that has an influence on bushing performance is the bushing seat on the truck. The bushing seat is the area on the hangar where the bushing makes contact. This area often has a rim to cup the edge of the bushing, adding a small amount of restriction as the bushing deforms through a turn. Some trucks have very loose or even non-existent bushing seats, whereas others have very restrictive bushing seats, greatly reducing bushing deformation. More restrictive bushing seats generally found on trucks designed with faster riding in mind as they offer more stability and lean.

=== Riser pads ===
Riser pads increase the distance between the wheels on a longboard and the deck in order to prevent wheel bite (when the deck scrapes the wheels, causing the wheels to stop turning). They also reduce the strain on the deck from the trucks being directly in contact with it and the vibration caused through riding. Riser pads are normally made of plastic. Shock pads, which are more rubbery than riser pads, serve the same function only with more emphasis on reducing strain and less on increasing the distance between the wheels and deck. Riser pads also come angled which can make the board turn more or less. Angled risers are usually used in long distance pumping to help aid the rider in propelling the board without pushing.

=== Bearings ===
Longboard bearings are all about reducing unnecessary friction to allow flawless stunt. Bearings connect the wheel to turn smoothly. Bearings can be made of many materials, including steel (which is most prevalent), titanium, or ceramics. Ceramic bearings are the most expensive. Bearings are usually rated in the ABEC scale. The ratings run from 1–9, using only odd numbers. The higher the rating, the more precise tolerances the bearing has been machined to. However, ABEC rating is not compulsory and not all bearings use ABEC ratings. Some companies will use other methods to describe the bearings' resistance and durability. Optionally, longboarders add bearing spacers between the bearings in the wheels. This allows for the axle nut to be tightened all the way down eliminating the high frequency wobbles and increasing the lifetime of the bearings.

=== Grip tape ===
Grip tape is a gritty material on the top of the board that provides traction so that shoes stay on the board. The tape comes in rolls that have a strong adhesive on the bottom. They are applied to the top of the board and then cut to fit the shape. Black sheet is the most common, however they can come in many colors or even can come in the form of a clear spray on adhesive. Most black grip tape is made of silicon carbide which provides excellent grip and stays sharp for a long time. However, some black tape and most colored tape is made from aluminum oxide which is a cheaper material and will lose a lot of grip over time. The tape gets dirty after a lot of use, which is more apparent on the clear and lighter colors. It will lose a lot of the grip after using it for a while, but it is easily replaced by heating the board to loosen the adhesive on the bottom and using a razor blade to separate it from the board.

=== Wheels ===
Almost all longboard wheels are made from urethane. The performance of longboard wheels is determined by five characteristics: height, lip shape, contact patch, durometer, and hub setting. Typical longboard wheels range from 65 to 107 millimeters (2.6 to 4.2 in) in diameter. A taller wheel will have slower acceleration but a faster rolling speed. Smaller wheels have the opposite effect. The durometer of a wheel is how hard the urethane is. A softer wheel will be ultimately slower than a harder wheel on smooth surface. When the road surface gets rougher a softer wheel provides a smoother, faster ride. The fastest duro for the normal road is around 80a. Softer wheels have more grip than harder wheels on any surface. The contact patch of a wheel is the width of the section of the wheel that makes contact with the road. Generally, the wider the wheel, the more traction it will have. Wheels can be anywhere from 50 to 100 mm (2.0 to 3.9 in) in width, but most commonly between 60 and 70 mm (2.4–2.8 in). The shape of the lip has a noticeable effect on traction. Rounded lips are made to break loose into a slide and square lips are made to grip. Square lipped wheels do break loose but the slide is not as smooth as that of a round lipped wheel. A wheel hub (or core) is the plastic (or sometimes aluminum) center of a wheel that holds the bearings. The position of the hub affects the properties of the wheel.

==== Centerset wheels ====
The hubs in centerset wheels are set equidistant from each lip of the wheel. Centerset wheels tend to have the most grip, because they have large inner lips, and it is the inner lip of a longboard wheel that grips the most. Some longboarders prefer centerset wheels for sliding because they wear more evenly and when they become coned they can be flipped and still have the same feel. Centerset wheels are more difficult to break loose than other wheels, and more speed is lost during the slide, but the slide is more controlled because of the grip the wheel has.

==== Side-set wheels ====
Side-set have wheel hubs set flush with the inside edge of the wheel. Side-set wheels offer a smooth transition from grip to slide, the slide typically being longer than that of any other wheel. This type of wheel has by far the fastest and most uneven wear because the rider's weight is on the very inside of the wheel. Freeriding is typically the discipline that this particular kind of wheel is used for.

==== Offset wheels ====
The hub of an offset wheel is between the center and the inside edge of the wheel. Offset wheels provide less grip than a centerset wheel, but more than a side-set wheel. Similarly, they break loose more easily than a centerset wheel, but less easily than a side-set wheel. These wheels usually feature square edges for more traction around corners or in carves. Off-set wheels are the most common wheel, typically used and designed for Downhill but they are used for all the other disciplines as well.

== Additional equipment ==
=== Slide gloves ===
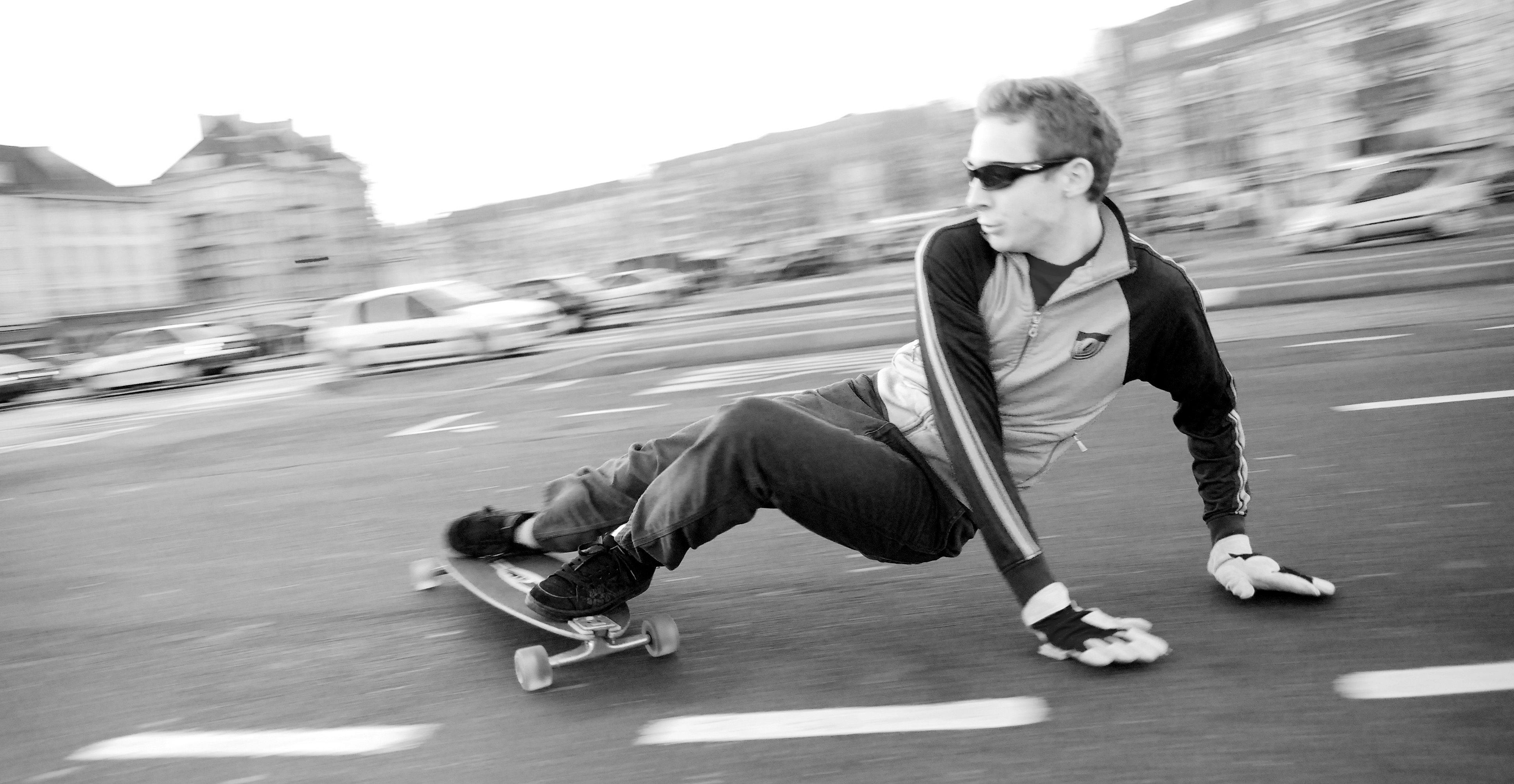
Slide gloves in use by longboarder

A pair of slide gloves is an important piece of equipment for longboarding. Slide gloves are for control as much as for safety. They allow the rider to touch the road and lean on his or her hand(s) to slide to a stop, to pre-drift into a corner, to touch the road to regain balance if balance is lost, and to protect the hands and support the rider's body during a fall. There are many style moves that also can slow the rider down that can be used called slides. There are various slides such as the K9, pendulum, coleman, and 1 footed stalefish. These types of gloves could be home made with just a thick plastic layer, and a glove.

=== Land paddle ===
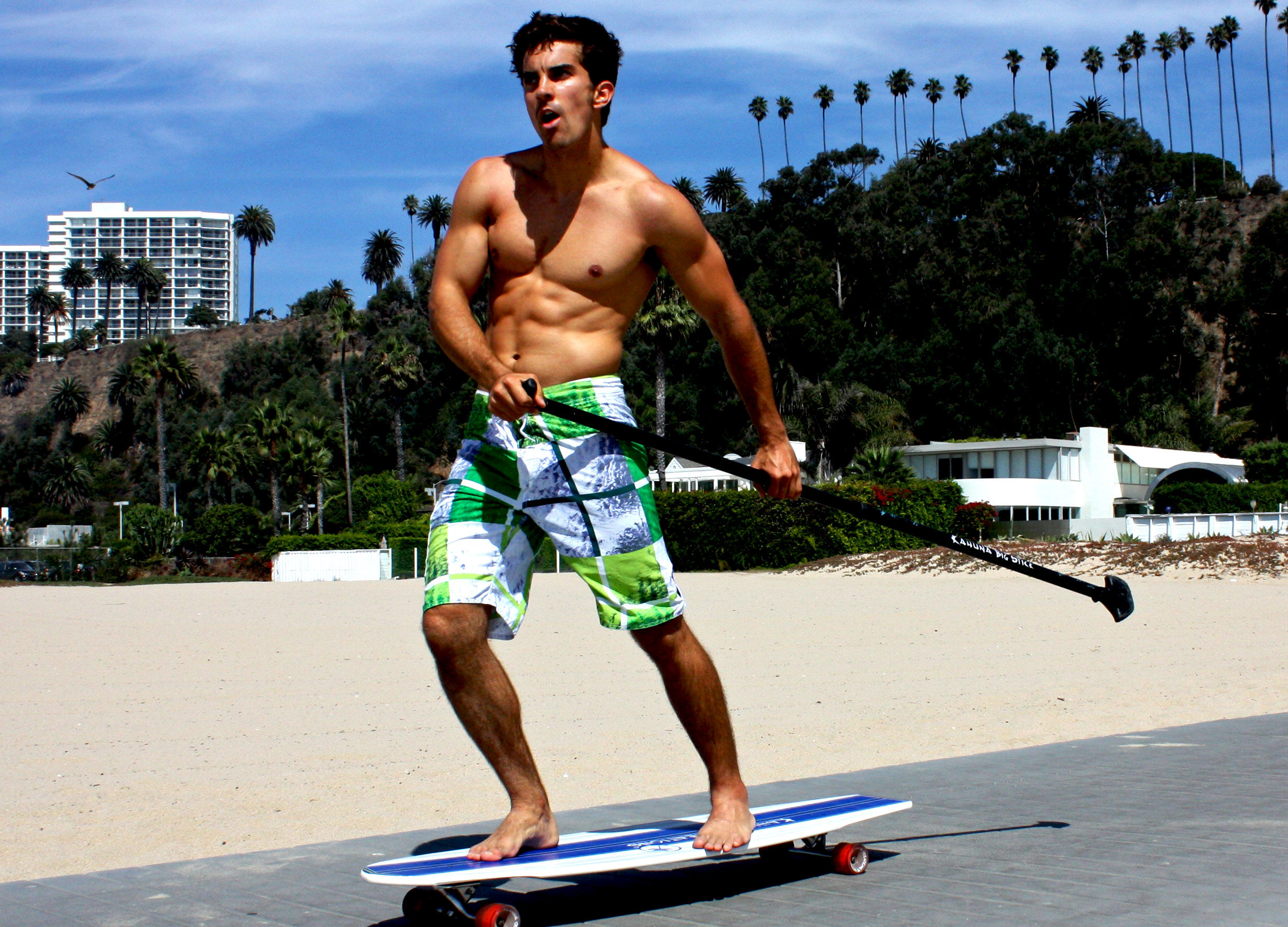
Land paddling with the Kahuna Creations Kahuna Stick.

A land paddle is a large pole or stick, usually with rubber or a similar material on the end, which can be used as a form of locomotion derived by the rider's arms to propel the rider further without the use of the rider's legs, to maintain balance while riding, and as a brake. The material at the end of the stick may appear circular but does not turn while attached. The shape allows riders to manually remove, turn and replace the attachment to promote even wear and extend its useful life.

== Longboard disciplines ==
=== Cruising ===
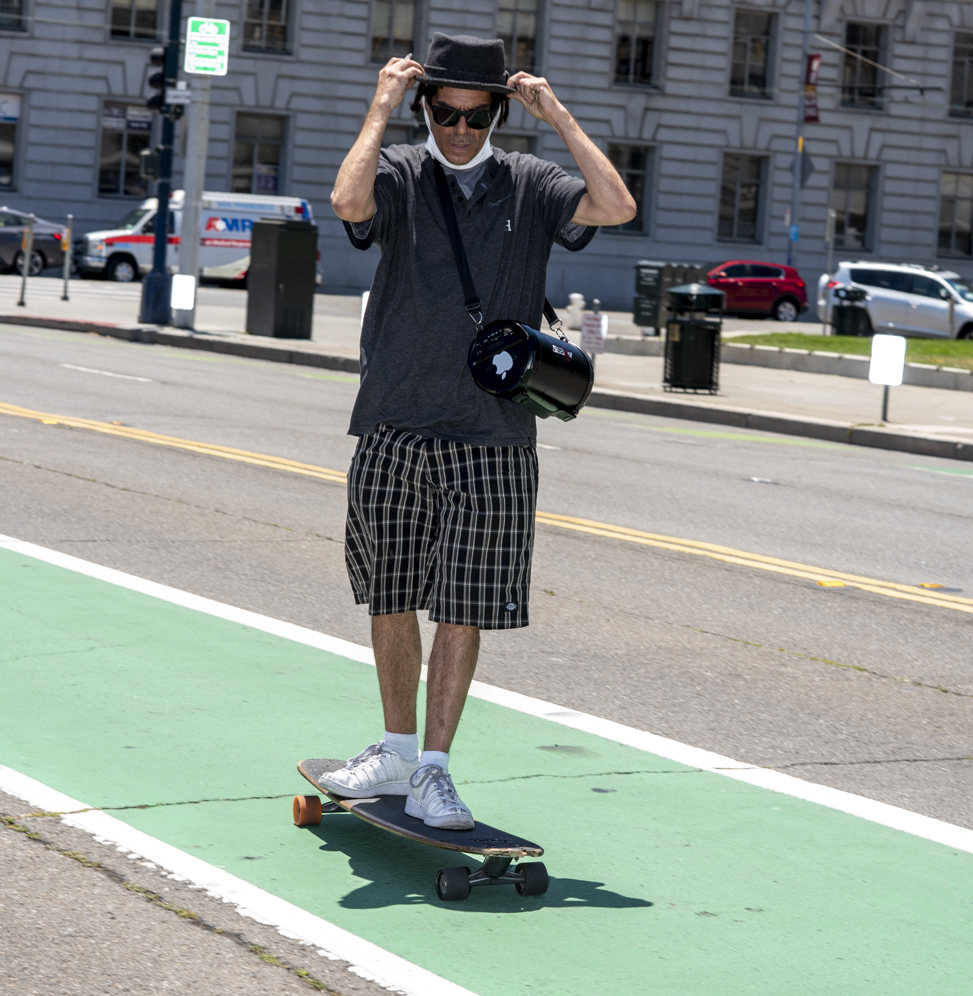
A skater cruising on his longboard

The "classic" purpose of longboards is for riding at a casual pace as a means of transportation. The focus is on foot pushing and relaxed riding at low speed along roads, paths, and city streets. Any longboard or skateboard can be used for cruising, though some are easier to push, brake, or ride at high speeds than others.

Long Distance Push – "LDP" is considered a subset of general cruising, but with the goal of riding long distances, often as a means of exercise. This style of riding requires greater expertise in riding switch (pushes with the weaker foot), foot-breaking, and pushing for power and speed. Dropped and double dropped decks are typically used here, making pushing easier than on a dropthrough or topmount board.

=== Carving ===
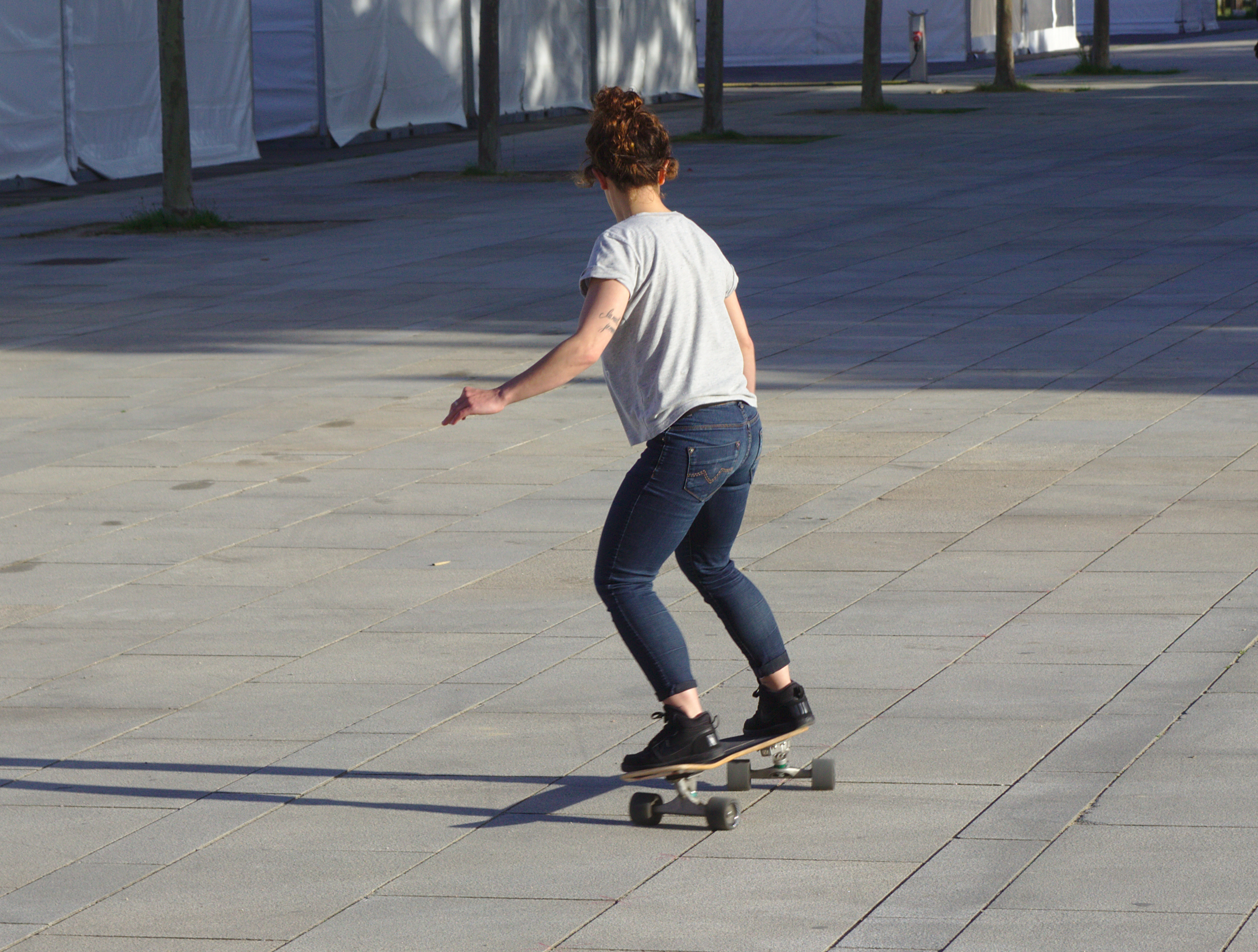
Carving

Carving, in and of itself, is not necessarily a discipline of longboarding. However, there are numerous subsets of carving that make its designation as a discipline more appropriate. Carving is a surf-like riding style that involves chaining quick successive turns back and forth in an S-like shape trajectory, in order to build and maintain momentum and speed. A longboard of any length or mounting style can be used to carve.

Pumping – Involves swaying your body back and forth and shifting your weight in a way that makes your longboard perform quick small turns, gaining momentum by leveraging centripetal forces, without your feet ever touching the ground. Carving is to reduce speed while pumping is meant to gain or maintain it. As a rule of thumb, a smaller deck will allow you to start pumping at a lower speed, while a larger deck will let you pump faster once at higher speeds.

Long Distance Pumping – Pumping for long distances, often combined with pushing. Commonly referred-to as "LDP", this is a minor subset of longboarding that has an avid, global group of riders.

Surfskating – A mix of carving and pumping, designed to simulate surfing. Typical short and wide with small wheels.

Slalom – Fast pumping over short distances, swerving around cones. Typically done as part of a racing competition on a shorter, highly maneuverable board.

=== Downhill ===
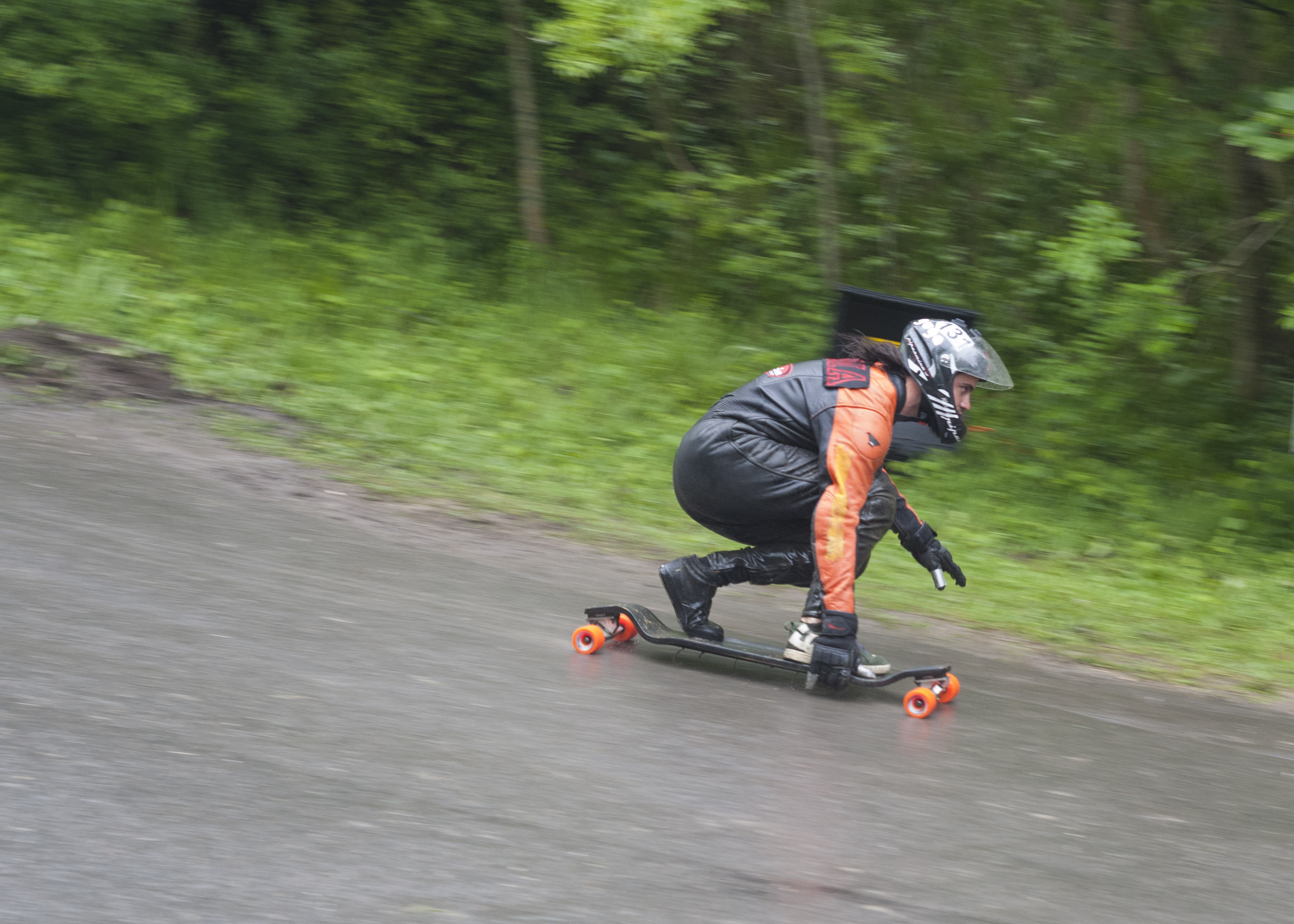
Freeride

Downhill – Also referred to as Speedboarding. Drop-through, drop-platform, and top-mount longboards are all used in downhill skateboarding. Downhill decks are very stiff and usually have a small to medium wheelbase around 51–64 centimeters (20–25 in).

Freeride – A subdiscipline of downhill. Freeriding involves downhill riding at low to moderate speed, with a focus on performing stylish power slides and drifts to control descent. Lighter freeriding is often done on drop-through or dropped decks and typically done at lower speeds.

Tech Sliding – Tech sliding, or technical sliding, is a discipline of downhill skateboarding where riders typically use hard wheels to bust out multiple fast-paced and creative slides. This discipline is only limited by the rider’s creativity. Decks are symmetrical and very hard wheels (95a-101a) are often used.

=== Freestyle ===
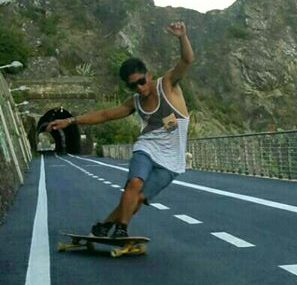
Dancing

Freestyle longboarding is a varied, diverse discipline that has roots in classic skateboarding while evolving beyond to be more suitable to the larger deck sizes used in longboarding. Freestyle is seen as an art, where riders use creative tricks and technical moves. For a classic and more flowly/slidy type of freestyle, a mid to full-sized double kick longboard, usually ranging from 110 to 120 centimeters (42–47 in) is often used.

Street/Ramp – Similar to street skating with its technical stunts, but with cruisers that are larger than classic skateboards. For street maneuvers like ollies and skate park riding, the best freestyle longboard typically looks like an oversized street skateboard, with bigger wheels for smoother rides.

Dance – A relatively new, artsy subdiscipline of freestyle longboarding. Dancing involves walking and cross-stepping on a moving longboard, performing elegant and stylish body spinning movements and even actual dancing, all while keeping the board rolling and carving on flat surfaces. Dancing longboards are in a category of their own, typically more than 100 centimeters (40 in) long.

The competitive landscape of longboard dancing has expanded globally, with significant circuits emerging in South America, such as the Dancing Shoes Latinoamérica tournament. The regional industry's growth was highlighted in 2026 when the Argentine-based company Manija Boards became the first Latin American brand to serve as an official sponsor and jury member for the So... Longboard Dancing World Cup in the Netherlands.

== See also ==
- Skateboard
- Longboarding
- Self-balancing scooter
- Snakeboard
- Freeboard (skateboard)
- Adrenalina Skateboard Marathon
- Brakeboard
- Mountainboarding
- Hamboards
