= Skateboard =

Wheeled wooden board used for skateboarding

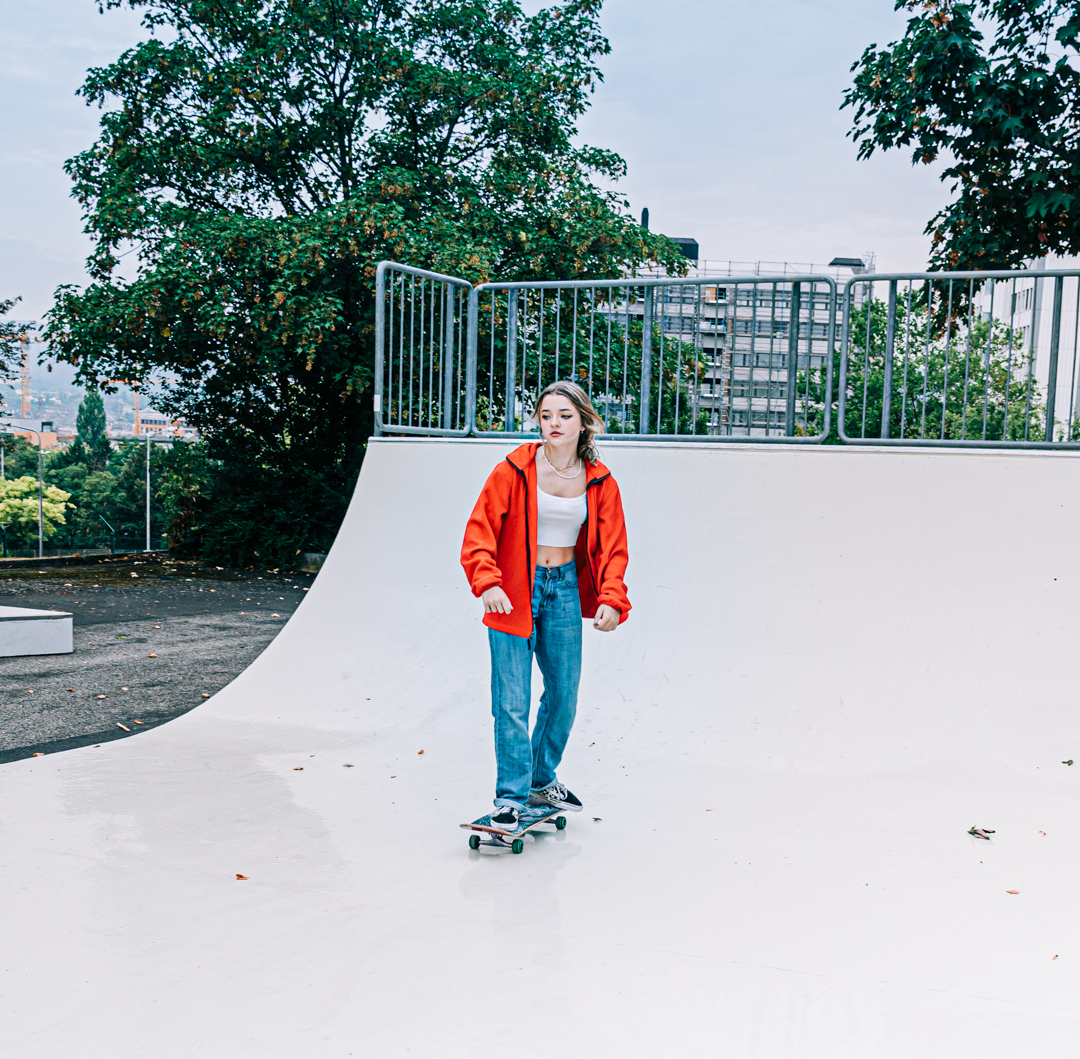
Riding a skateboard

A skateboard is a type of sports equipment used for skateboarding. It is usually made of a specially designed 7–8-ply maple plywood deck and has polyurethane wheels attached to the underside by a pair of skateboarding trucks.

The skateboard moves by pushing with one foot while the other foot remains balanced on the board, or by pumping one's legs in structures such as a bowl or half pipe. A skateboard can also be used by standing on the deck while on a downward slope and allowing gravity to propel the board and the rider. If the rider's leading foot is their left foot, they are said to ride "regular". Conversely, they are said to ride "goofy" if their leading foot is their right foot.

The two main types of skateboards are the longboard and shortboard. The shape of the board is also important: the skateboard must be concave to perform tricks.

== History ==
Skateboarding, as it exists today, was likely born sometime in the late 1940s, or early 1950s, when surfers in California wanted something to do when the waves were flat. The first skateboards were likely made from wheels from roller skates attached to a wooden plank. Skateboarding was initially called "sidewalk surfing," and gained in popularity and spread via surf culture. The first skateboards were handmade from wooden boxes and planks by individuals. Companies started manufacturing skateboards in 1959, as the sport became more popular.

Skateboarding is a very individual activity, and it continues to evolve. Since 1987, due to attention in mainstream films, media and products like skateboarding video games, children's skateboards and commercialization, skateboarding has been pulled into the mainstream. Thanks to famous skateboarders such as Tony Hawk, skateboarding has become a major sport. As more interest and money has been invested into skateboarding, more skate parks, and better skateboards have become available. In addition, the continuing interest has motivated skateboarding companies to keep innovating and inventing new things. Skateboarding appeared for the first time in the 2020 Summer Olympics.

== Parts ==
=== Deck ===
"Long" boards are usually over 36 inches (91 cm) long. Plastic "penny" boards are typically about 22 inches (56 cm) long. Some larger penny boards over 27 inches (69 cm) long are called "nickel" boards.

The longboard, a common variant of the skateboard, is used for higher speed and rough surface boarding, and they are much more expensive. "Old school" boards (those made in the 1970s–80s or modern boards that mimic their shape) are generally wider and often have only one kicktail. Variants of the 1970s often have little or no concavity.

=== Wheels ===
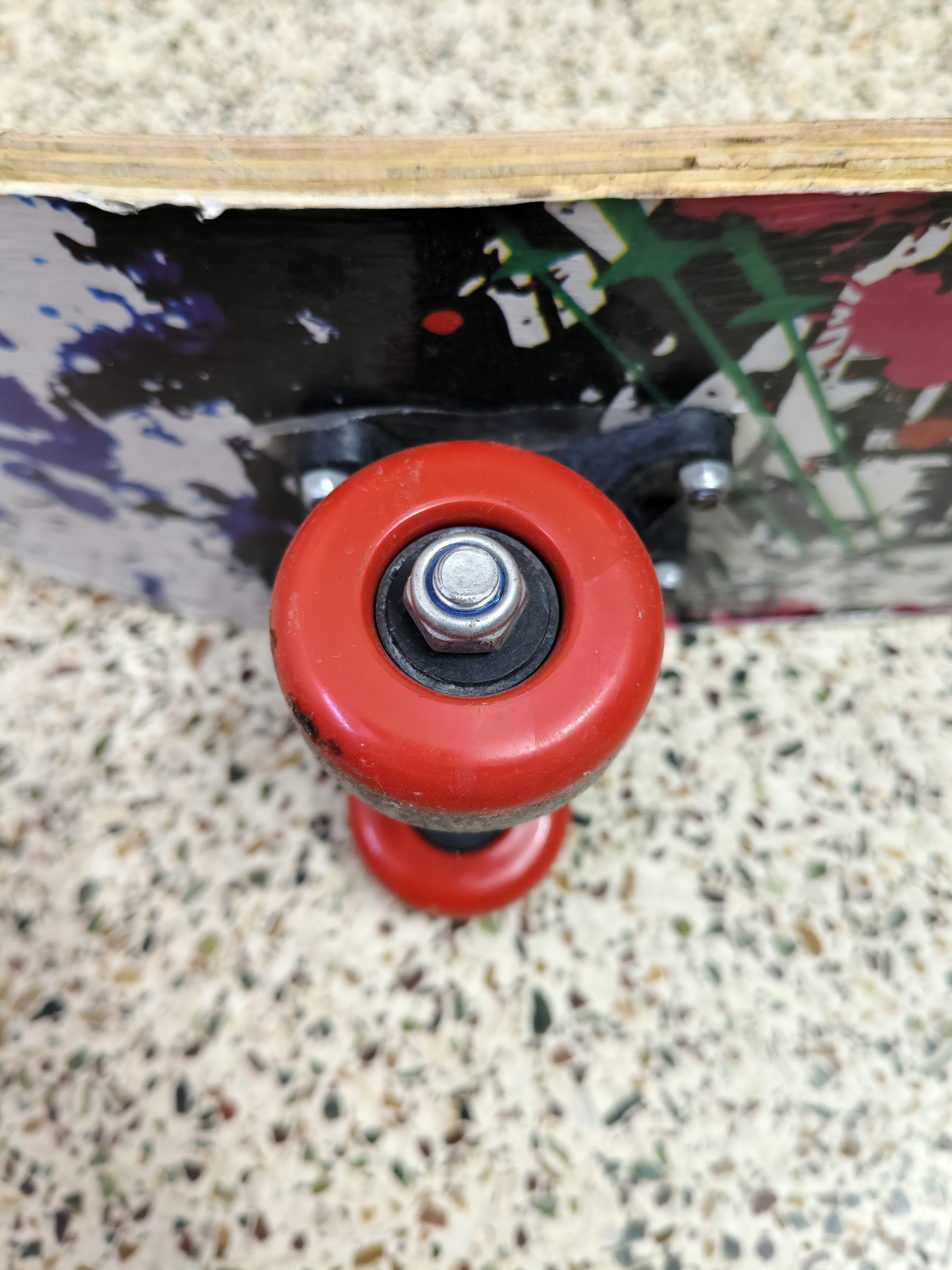
Skateboard Wheel

The wheels allow for movement on the skateboard and helps determine the speed while riding. There are typically four wheels on a skateboard that are attached to the trucks. Ranging in size from around 48mm to around 60mm, smaller wheels are lighter in weight and are used for shorter distances and tricks. The wheels are typically made of polyurethane (PU) and come in different grades of PU. Higher-grade PU is more durable and provides a smoother ride, while lower-grade PU is more affordable but wears out faster. Larger wheels are heavier in weight, which are better for maintaining speed and longer distances. Wheels that are larger than 60mm are typically used for longboards.

=== Trucks ===
The metal parts known as skateboard trucks are what hold a skateboard's wheels to the deck. They are made up of a hanger that holds the axle and wheels and a baseplate that is mounted to the board. The hanger and baseplate are joined by a kingpin, allowing the truck to swivel and turn.

Trucks for skateboards come in a variety of forms and sizes and can be modified to the rider's preferences. The truck's height can have an impact on the board's stability and turning ability. Many skateboarders choose trucks with width approximately equal to the width of the deck though wider trucks are sometimes chosen for more landing stability for those who perform vert or big air tricks.

To manage the looseness or tightness of the trucks, the kingpin's tightness can also be changed. This is a matter of taste and has an impact on the board's stability and ability to turn.

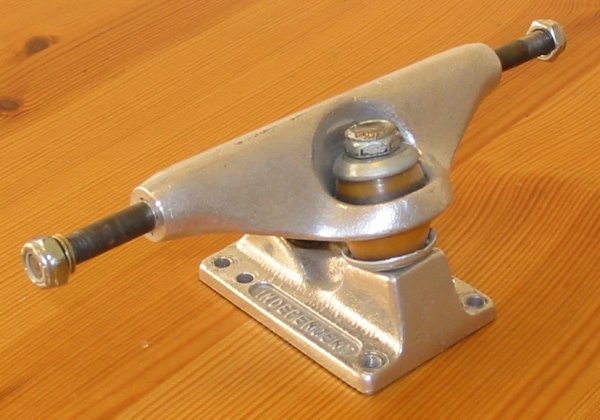
An Independent brand skateboard truck

=== Bearings ===
Each skateboard wheel is mounted on its axle via two ball bearings. With few exceptions, the bearings are the industrial standard "608" size, with a bore of 8 or 10 mm (0.315 or 0.394 inches) depending on the axle, an outer diameter of 22 mm (0.866 inches), and a width of 7 mm (0.276 inches). These are usually made of steel, though silicon nitride, a high-tech ceramic, is sometimes used. Many skateboard bearings are graded according to the ABEC scale. The starts with ABEC 1 with the least precise manufacturing tolerance, followed by 3, 5, 7, and ABEC 9 with the strictest tolerance. Bearing performance is determined by how well maintained the bearings are. Maintenance on bearings includes periodically cleaning and lubricating them.

An animation of the working principle for a ball bearing. While an 8-balled bearing is shown here, skateboard bearings are typically 7-balled.

== Optional components ==
=== Risers/wedges ===
Wedges can be used to change the turning characteristics of a truck.

=== Skateboard multi-tool ===
While not part of a skateboard, an all-in-one skateboard tool capable of mounting and removing trucks & wheels and adjusting truck kingpins are commonly sold by skate shops.

=== Deck rails ===
Deck rails are thin, plastic strips usually screwed into the bottom section of a skateboard to decrease friction while performing slide tricks and protecting the board's graphic from damage.

== Standard Dimensions ==
Popsicle skateboard decks are commonly sold with widths ranging from 7.5" – 9". The most commonly used size is probably 8.25" width by 32.475" length. The wheelbase is 14.25" from the center with the nose at 7.25" longer than the tail, 6.875".

== See also ==
- Caster board
- Electric skateboard
- Hoverboard
- Self-balancing scooter
- Slalomboard
- Snowboard
- Surfboard
- Wakeboard
- Fingerboard
