= Kick scooter =

Human-powered land vehicle

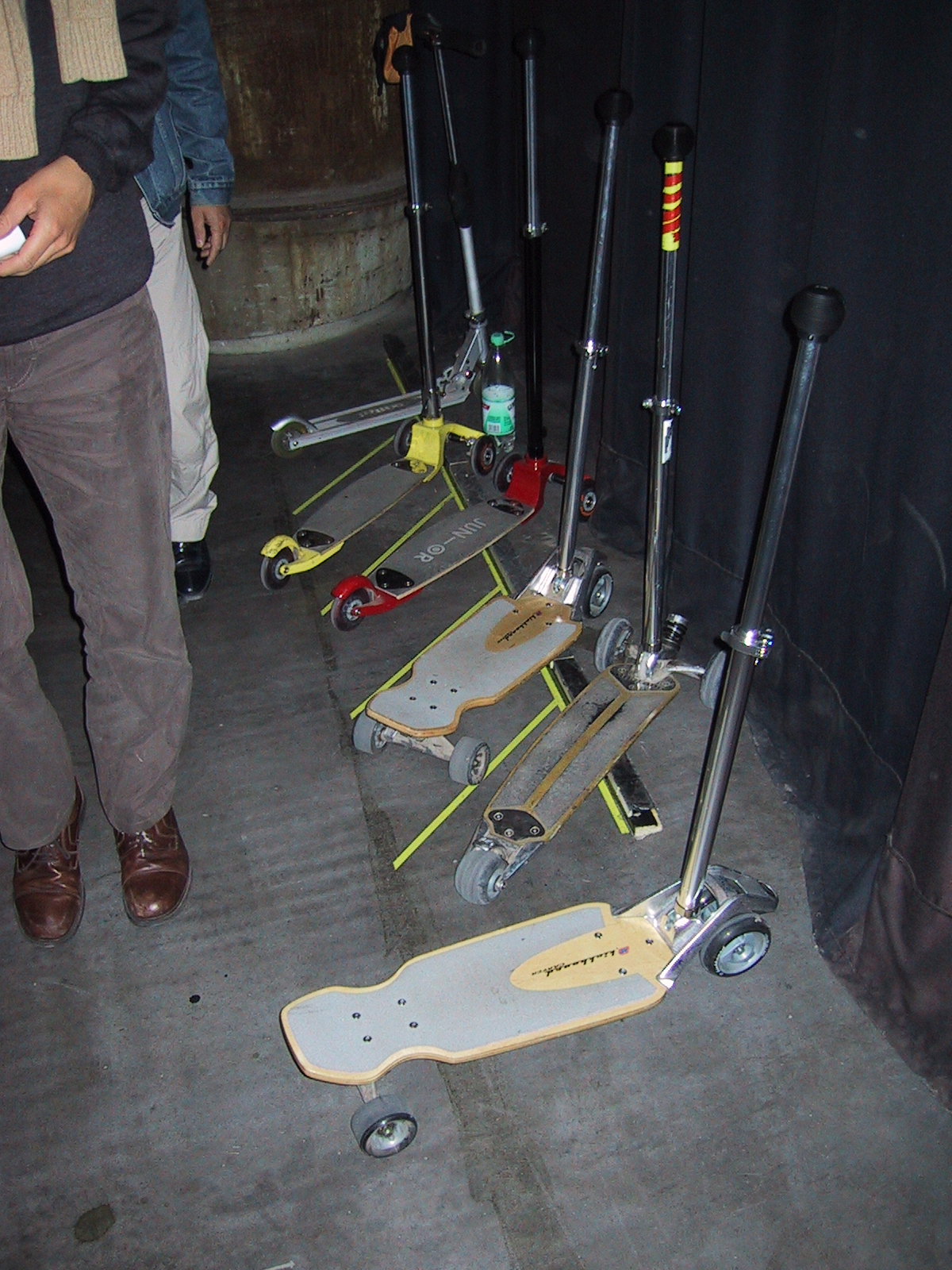
Two-wheeled, three-wheeled and four-wheeled scooters which appeared around 2000

A kick scooter (also referred to as a push-scooter or scooter) is a human-powered street vehicle with a handlebar, deck, and wheels propelled by a rider pushing off the ground with their leg. Today the most common scooters are made of aluminum, titanium, and steel. Some kick scooters made for younger children have 3 to 4 wheels (but most common ones have 2 wheels) and are made of plastic and do not fold. High-performance kickbikes are also made. A company that had once made the Razor Scooters revitalized the design in the mid-nineties and early two-thousands. Three-wheel models whose frames fork into two decks are known as Y scooters or trikkes.

Motorized scooters, historically powered by internal combustion engines, and more recently electric motors, are self-propelled kick scooters capable of speeds sometimes exceeding 30 km/h (19 mph).

== Models and history ==
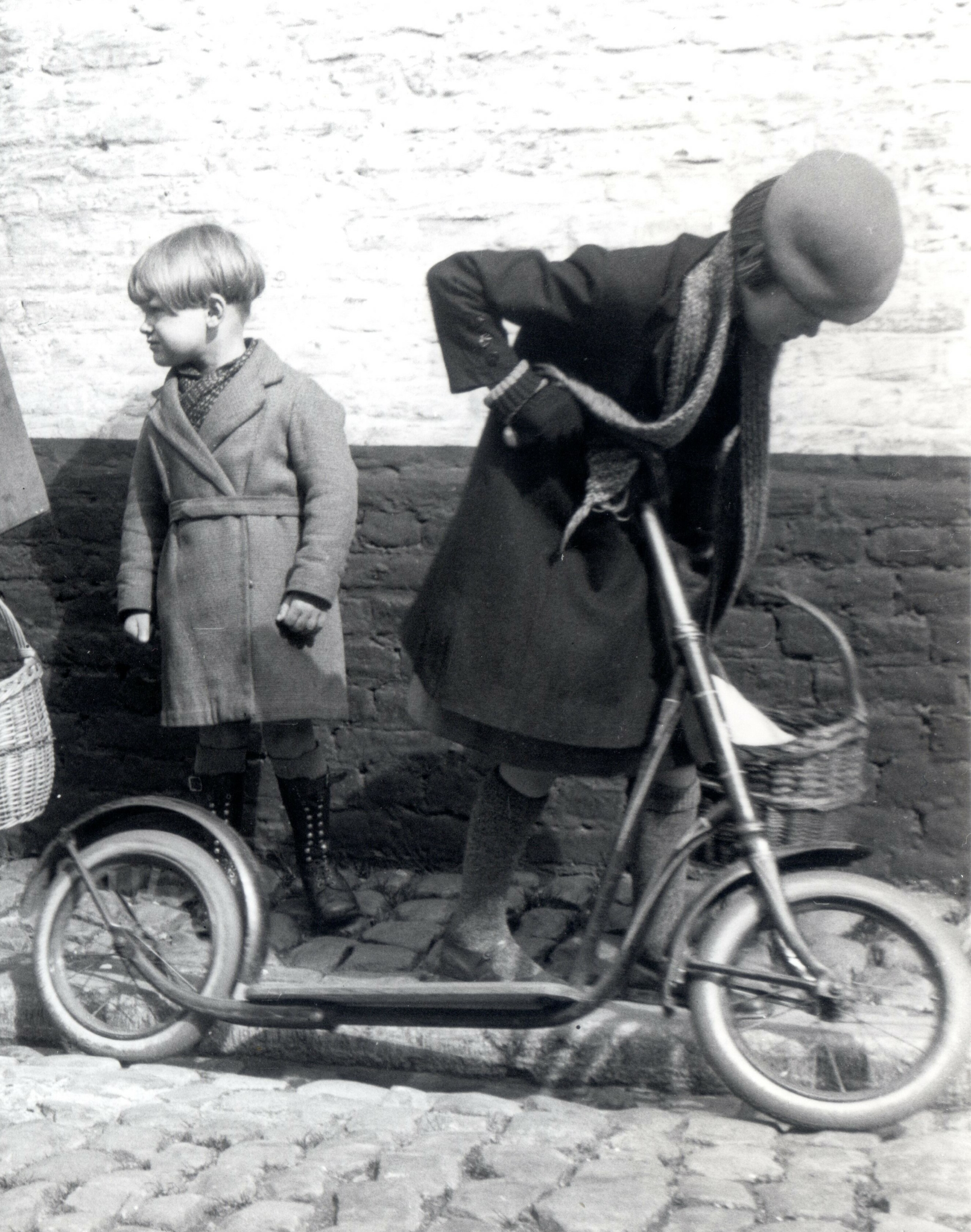
An early kick scooter in Diest, Belgium, 1936. Photo by Léon van Dievoet.

=== Early scooters ===
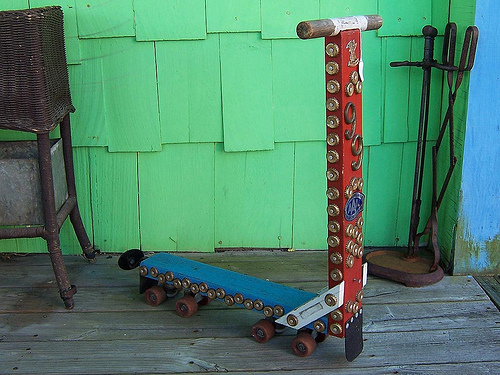
Wooden scooter with a pair of roller skates

Kick scooters have been handmade in industrial urban areas in Europe and the United States since the 1920s or earlier, often as toys made for children to roam the streets. One common home-made version is made by attaching roller skate wheelsets to a board with some kind of handle, usually an old box. To turn, riders can lean or use a second board connected by a crude pivot. The construction was all wood, with 3–4 inch (75–100 mm) wheels containing steel ball bearings. An additional advantage of this construction was a loud noise, like from a "real" vehicle. An alternative construction consists of one steel clamp on a roller skate divided into front and rear parts and attached to a wood beam.

The German Bundesarchiv for "roller" details that both homemade and manufactured children's scooters were used and even raced in Paris, Berlin and Leipzig in 1930, 1948 and 1951. They are similar to later designs.

The short movie "A Trip Through the Streets of Amsterdam" from 1922 shows several children on scooters.

=== Kick scooter ===
In 1974, the Honda company made the Kick 'n Go, a scooter driven by a pedal on a lever. While it seemed to be as much effort to "kick" as a regular scooter, the novelty of it caught on and it became popular nevertheless.

=== Pneumatic tires ===
Before bicycles became popular among children, steel scooters with two small bicycle wheels were more common. Around 1987, many BMX manufacturers produced BMX-like scooters, such as Scoot. Those manufacturers discontinued their scooters, but some scooter manufacturers were established in later years and remain in business. These scooters are still used in dense urban areas for utility purposes, since they are faster than a folding scooter. Some are made for off-road use and are described as mountain scooters. In addition to commuting, sports competition, and off-road use, large wheel scooters are a favorite for dog scootering, an activity in which single or team dogs, such as huskies, pull a scooter and its rider in the same way that a sled is pulled across snow. Some Amish do not want to ride bicycles, so they ride scooters instead. Today, variations on the kicksled with scooter design features are also available, such as the Kickspark.

==== Kickbike ====
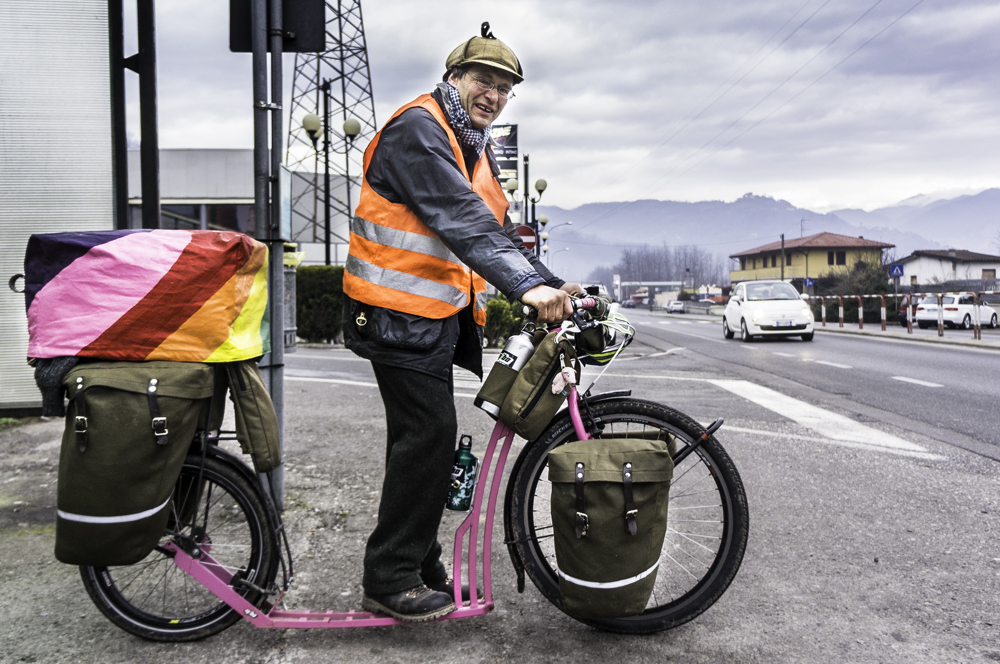
Modern kickbike

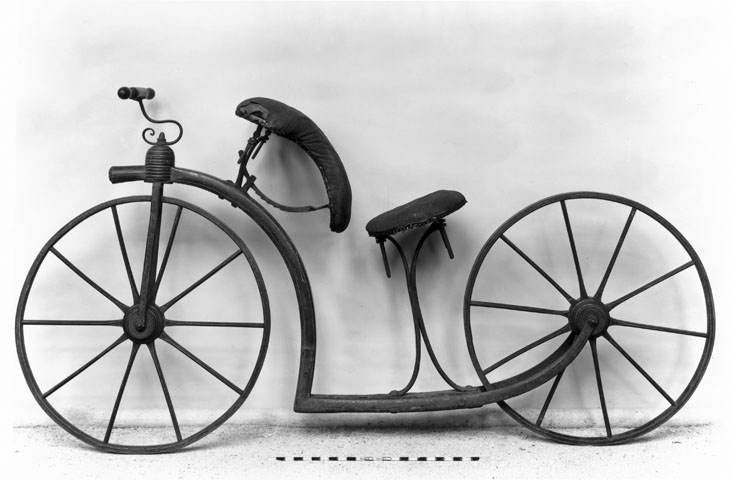
A similar vehicle had been produced by Denis Johnson in 1819

The development of the kickbike in Finland in 1994 changed the way scooters are viewed. The Kickbike has a large standard size bicycle front wheel and a much smaller rear wheel, which allows for a much faster ride. The Footbike Eurocup has been held since 2001.

=== Folding scooters ===
Children on scooters

In 1990, a foldable aluminium scooter with inline skates wheels was created by Wim Ouboter of Micro Mobility Systems in Switzerland. The scooter was sold as "Micro Skate Scooter," "Razor," and "JDBUG/JDRAZOR MS-130A". The Razor was introduced to Japan in 1999, with many early adopters being young Japanese who used it for portable transport. It later became a worldwide fad and these small scooters also became popular toys for children.

=== Pro scooters ===
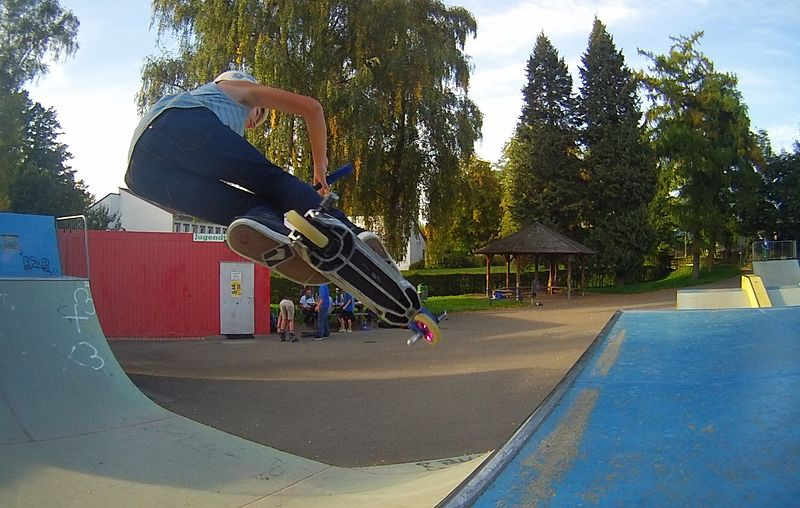
Children on stunt scooters

Kick scooters used for extreme sport are called pro scooters. They are specially made to withstand damage as the rider performs stunts and tricks. Numerous brands specialize in stunt scooters and accessories including lightweight and high strength parts, helmets, pads, ramps, grind wax, griptape, grips, bearings and clothing.

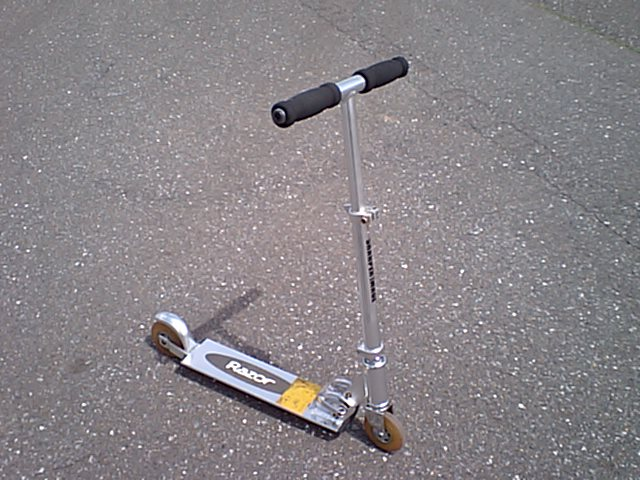
Early Razor scooter with 98 mm wheels

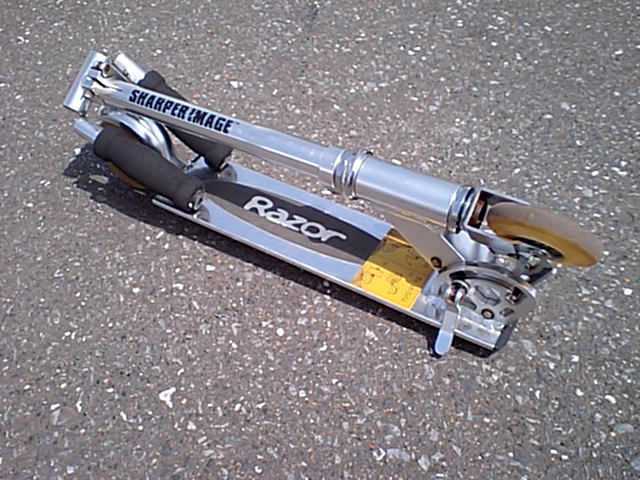
Folded Razor scooter

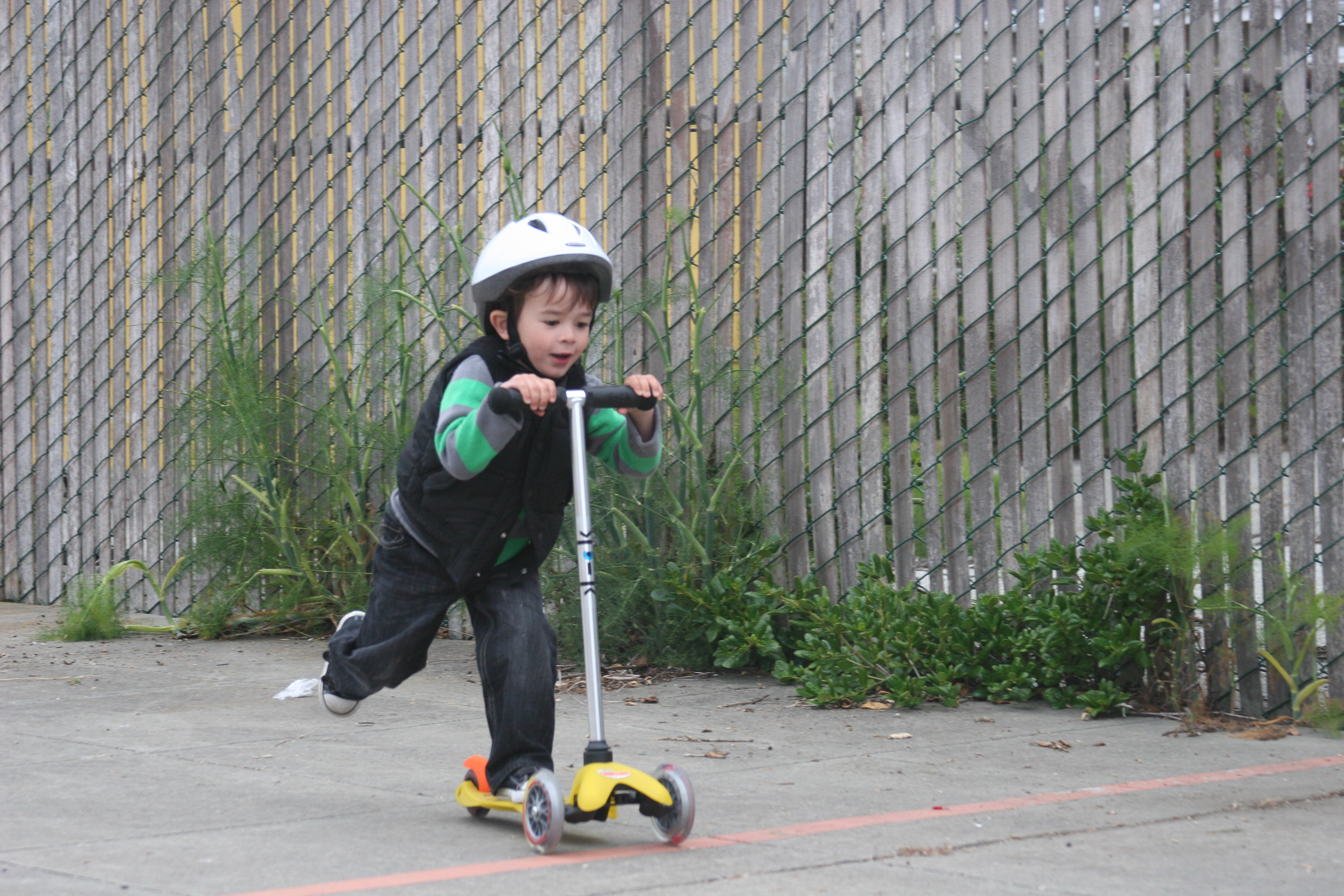
A Mini Micro scooter with three wheels

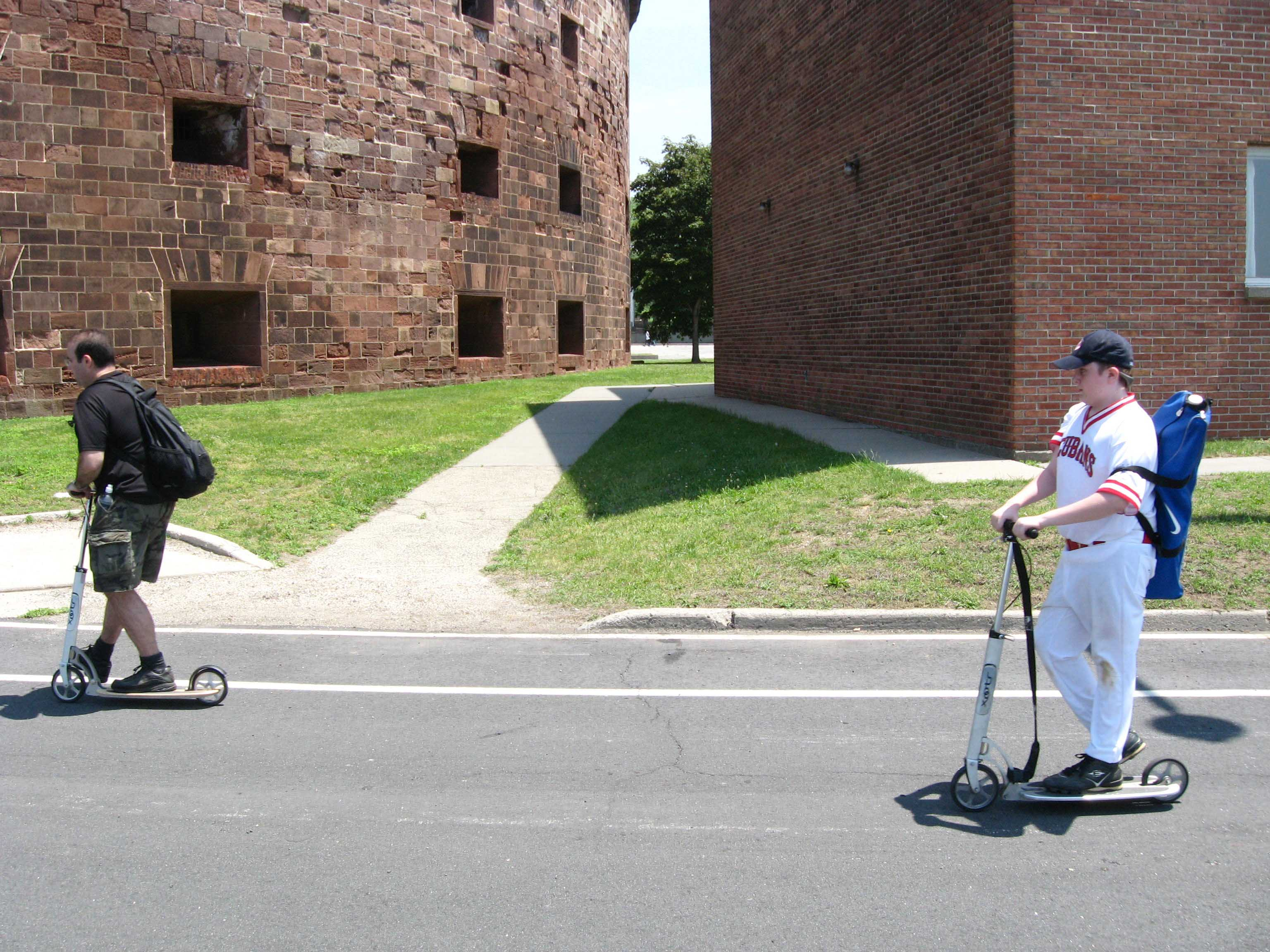
Xootr scooters in the USA

=== Three wheels ===
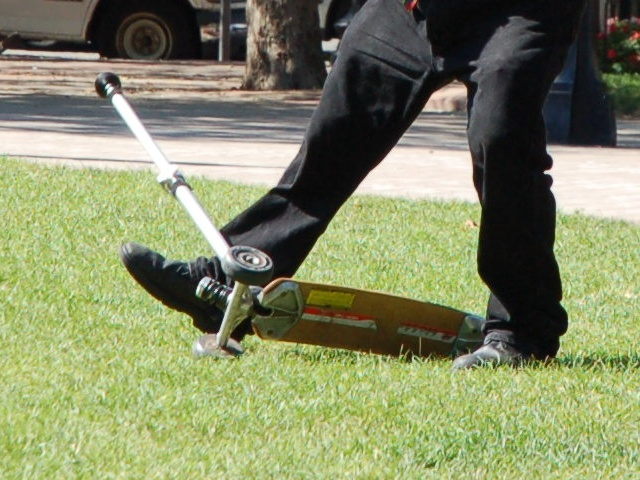
A three-wheeled K2 Kickboard

Three-wheeled scooters similar to tricycles have been produced for little children.

In 1999, Micro Mobility Systems and K2 Sports produced a reverse-three-wheeled scooter called "Kickboard". Micro also produced the Kickboard-like children's scooters "Mini Micro" and "Maxi Micro". The reverse design inherently provides greater stability than the standard: a standing person will tend to stand at the front of a scooter rather than at the back. However, the steering geometry is inherently weak and requires design adaptation to improve its response. An example is the Mini Micro, which uses a spring-loaded system to translate lateral force on the handbars (child leaning) into turning motion on the wheels, referred by its makers as "lean and steer".

=== Four wheels ===
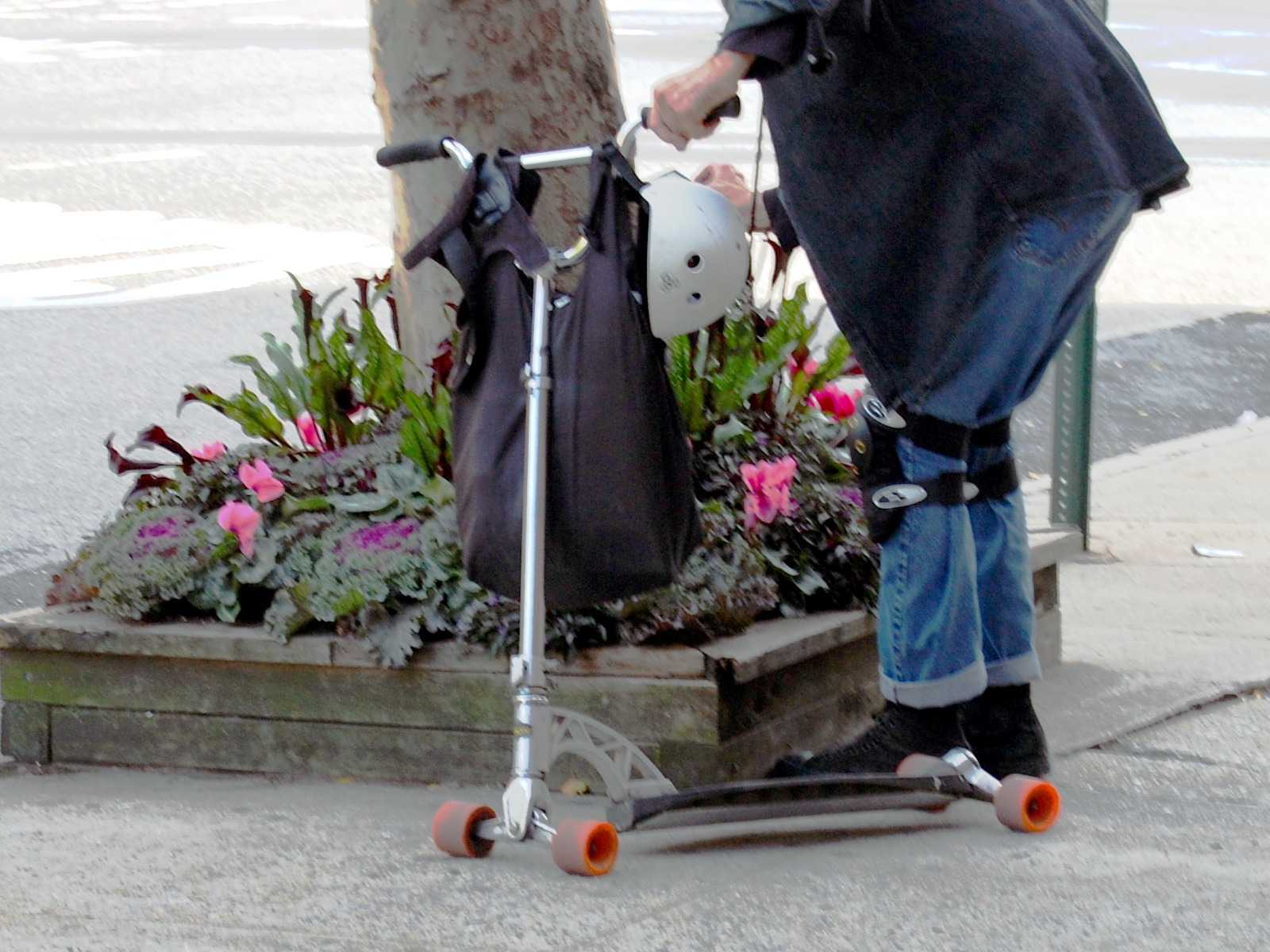
A Fuzion-like scooter

The early scooters, which were made with roller skates, were four-wheeled like skateboards.

Around 2000, a Swiss company produced a four-wheeled scooter called the "Wetzer Stickboard". The Wetzer Stickboard was a narrow skateboard with a foldable pole on the nose.

In 2006, a company called Nextsport started producing a line of four-wheeled scooters, known as Fuzions. The scooters are typically bigger and heavier than Razor and Micro models. The early Fuzion models come with large, wide wheels, and an oversized deck for stability. Later scooters such as the Fuzion NX included smaller and harder wheels. It also included 360 degree handlebar spinning capabilities, unlike its predecessors.

=== Electric kick scooters ===
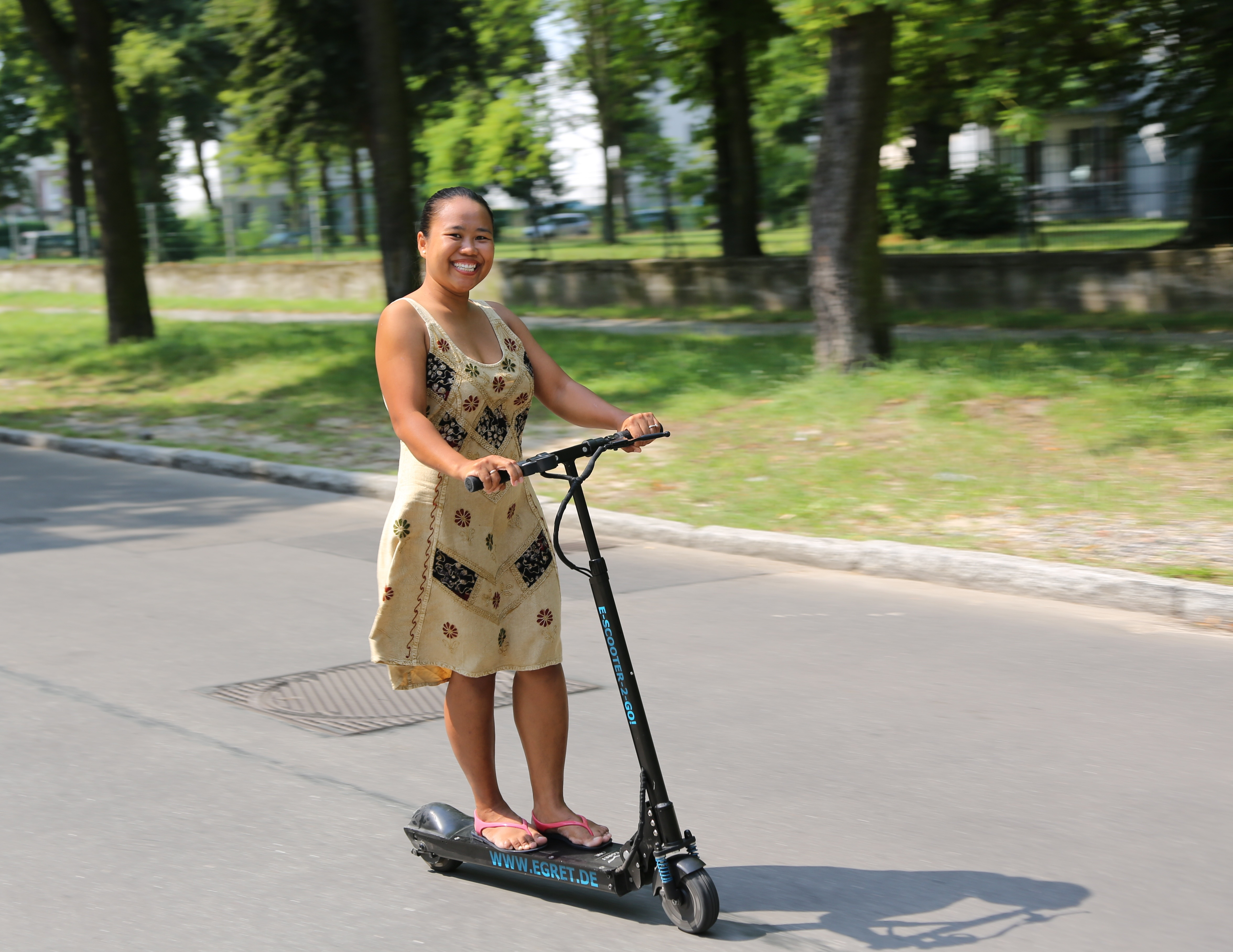
Riding an electric kick scooter in Berlin (2014)

Electric models achieved popularity over their gas-powered counter parts in the early 2000. They are often manufactured for fleet rentals, such as Lime e-scooters. Shared electric kick scooters have also made a certain contribution to environmental protection, because they do not emit greenhouse gases, reduce traffic congestion and reduce the need for public transportation, however they are most sustainable when they are "replacing personalized individual transport".

== Safety ==
Care must be taken when going up or down curbs, as this can cause the scooter to come to a sudden stop, sending the rider onto the ground. This can also happen from a collision with the edge of a pothole.

== See also ==
- Chukudu – A freight vehicle in the Democratic Republic of the Congo
- Electric skateboard
- Freestyle scootering
- Wiggle scooter
- ABEC scale
