= Cyclist fatality rate in U.S. by year =

List of cyclist or cycling deaths (any kind) in U.S. by year

Cycling generally includes the riding of unicycles, tricycles, quadracycles, and similar human-powered transport (HPVs). Note however that many HPV users are not considered cyclists, for example, using NHTSB statistics (US), skateboarder deaths are classified as pedestrians, yet it is unclear how Trikkes are classified.

The following table summarizes the number of people killed and/or injured in fatal cyclist collisions (as defined/reported by NHTSB) in the USA. Statistics (generally) may vary based on the definition of what constitutes an injury or death, in particular time after incident and complications for deaths, and severity for injuries, therefore comparing statistics across years or nations requires a bit of deeper investigation. Many injuries go unreported. E-scooter deaths are being classified as pedestrians.

Year	U.S. Fatalities	U.S. Population	U.S. fatalities per 100,000 People	U.S. Injuries	U.S. Cycle Trips	California Fatalities	Florida Fatalities	New York Fatalities	Texas Fatalities
2020	891	331,002,651	0.269						
2019	846	329,064,917	0.257	49000					
2018	854	327,096,265	0.262						73
2017	777	326,213,213	0.238						58
2016	840	323,121,000	0.260						68
2015	818			45000					53
2014	729			50000		128		47	50
2013	749			48000		147		40	48
2012	734			49000		123	120	45	59
2011	682			45000				57	49
2010	623	308,745,538	0.202			100	83	36	43
2009	628								
2008	718								
2007	701								
2006	772							45	
2005	786								
2004	727								
2003	629								
2002	665								
2001	732							42	
2000	693	281,421,906	0.246						
1999	754								
1998	760								
1997	814								
1996	765								
1995	833								
1994	802								
1993	816								
1992	723								
1991	843								
1990	859	248,709,873	0.345						
1989	832								
1988	911								
1987	948								
1986	941								
1985	890								
1984	849								
1983	839								
1982	883								
1981	936								
1980	965	226,545,805	0.422						
1979	932								
1978	892								
1977	922								
1976	914								
1975	1003								
1974	1000								
1973	1000								
1972	1000								
1971	800								
1970	780	203,211,926	0.384						
1969	800								
1968	790								
1967	750								
1966	740								
1965	680								
1964	710								
1963	580								
1962	500								
1961	490								
1960	460	179,323,175	0.257						
1959	480								
1958	450								
1957	450								
1956	440	168,903,031	0.261						
1955	410								
1954	380								
1953	420								
1952	430								
1951	390								
1950	440	151,325,798	0.291						
1949	550								
1948	500								
1947	550								
1946	450								
1945	500								
1944	400								
1943	450								
1942	650								
1941	910								
1940	750	132,164,569	0.567						
1939	710								
1938	720								
1937	700								
1936	650								
1935	450								
1934	500								
1933	400								
1932	350								

== See also ==
- Transportation safety in the United States
