= Micro Scooters =

British importer and retailer of scooters

Micro Scooters Ltd
- Type: Private
- Industry: Online Retailer
- Founded: 2004
- Founder: Anna Gibson; Philippa Gogarty
- Headquarters: London, United Kingdom
- Products: Scooters
- Number of employees: 30
- Website: www.micro-scooters.co.uk

Micro Scooters Limited is an importer and retailer of a range of children’s and adult scooters, based in London. The company was founded in 2004 by marine lawyer Anna Gibson and charity fundraiser Philippa Gogarty.

== History ==
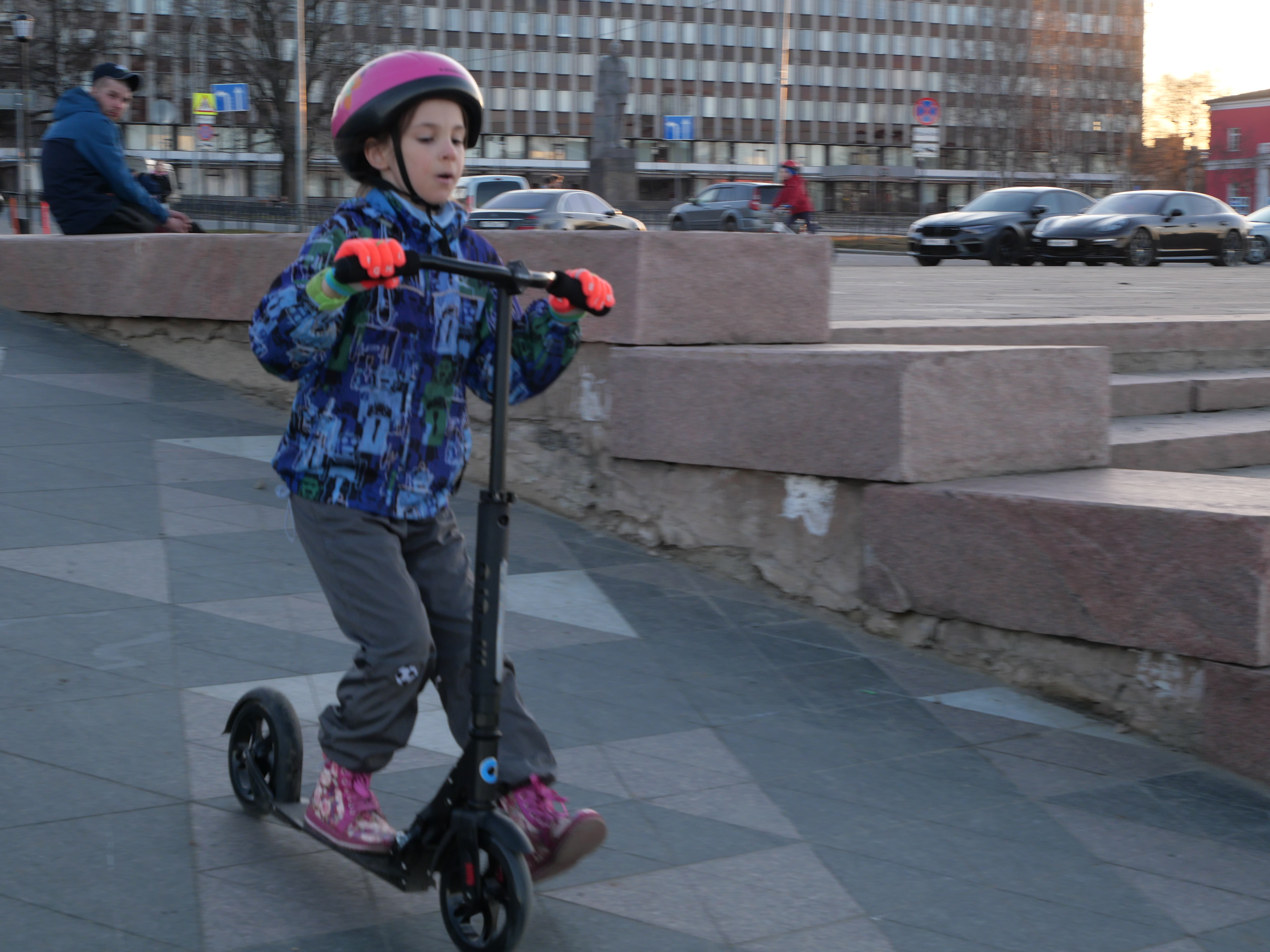
Girl on a Micro Urban scooter, exit from the slope, Russia, 2021

After Anna’s son borrowed another child’s three wheel scooter at an event on Clapham Common and refused to give it back, Anna and Philippa made contact with Swiss banker Wim Oubtoer, the founder of Micro Mobility Systems and the manufacturers of the scooter Anna's son had borrowed. The two parties came to an agreement which allowed Gibson and Gogarty the licensing rights to sell Micro Scooters in the UK. After selling Mini Micro scooters to their friends at the school gates success came quickly, with word of mouth providing the best marketing tool. A buyer from John Lewis subsequently picked up on the success Gibson and Gogarty were experiencing and within a year of starting to sell them at the school gates, Micro Scooters became John Lewis’ bestselling toy selling 65,000 scooters at the Christmas of 2009.

In 2010 the company sold over 120,000 scooters with turnover of £4.3m. After the initial success of the 'Mini Micro' scooter, Gibson & Gogarty worked directly with Micro Mobility Systems to produce scooter variants for younger and older children. Micro Scooters Limited now retails over 50 models of scooters suitable for ages 12 months up to adults. This has resulted in industry recognition via a number of reputable publications and newspapers. According to Sustrans, 2.4% of school children in Scotland used a scooter to get to school in 2018.

== Community programmes and campaigns ==
Since 2021, Micro Scooters has partnered with the charity Spread a Smile to provide scooters and accessories for children receiving hospital care in the United Kingdom. In 2025, reports indicated that the company was donating around 20 scooters and helmets each month to 39 NHS partner hospitals.

For more than ten years, the company has supported scooter proficiency training in schools, delivered under the names Scootability and Scoot Safe. The programme is run in partnership with Team Rubicon and has been adopted by several local councils.

In 2021 the company introduced a scheme called Scooter Aid, in collaboration with the charity In Kind Direct. The initiative refurbishes donated Micro scooters and redistributes them to charities across the United Kingdom.

Micro Scooters has also supported Big Walk and Wheel, a challenge event organised by the charity Sustrans to encourage active travel to school. The company has provided prizes and sponsorship for the event.

In both 2021 and 2024, the company worked with the British Olympic Association to launch a range of Team GB-themed scooters, released to coincide with the Summer Olympic Games.

== Awards and certifications ==
Micro Scooters has been a Certified B Corporation since September 2022. In August 2025, the company re-certified with an increased B Impact Score of 100.5.

In 2022, Micro Scooters became the United Kingdom's first carbon-neutral scooter retailer, with all product-manufacturing emissions calculated and offset through the Carbon Neutral Britain scheme.

In 2024, the company received the European Contact Centre & Customer Service Award (ECCCSA) for "Best Customer Service in Europe".

Micro Scooters products have also been recognized in independent consumer reviews:

- In 2025, Expert Reviews named the Micro Speed the "best adult scooter for short journeys".
- Which? included the Mini Micro Scooter in its "best gifts for two-year-olds" list in 2025.
- The Independent recommended the Maxi Micro Deluxe Foldable LED Scooter as the "best foldable kids’ scooter" in 2025.
- In the same year, The Independent also listed the Maxi Micro Foldable as the "best scooter for five-year-olds".
- The Independent further included the Mini Micro Luggage among the "best suitcases for kids" in 2024.
- In 2024, the Evening Standard featured the Micro 3D Dino Helmet in its guide to the "best multisport helmets for kids".
- In 2025, Made for Mums named the Mini Micro 6in1 Rock & Go Scooter Gold in the "Best First Scooter" category.

== See also ==
- Micro Mobility Systems
- Kick scooters
