= Tiia Piili =

Finnish aerobic gymnast

- Born: April 16, 1979 (age 47) Lappeenranta

Gymnastics career
- Discipline: Aerobic gymnastics
- Country represented: Finland

Tiia Piili (born April 16, 1979 in Lappeenranta, Finland) is a Finnish gymnast who has won the Federation of International Sports, Aerobics and Fitness (FISAF) sport aerobics World Championship four times.

== Early life ==
As a youngster, Piili pursued various sporting interests including ballet, rhythmic gymnastics, artistic gymnastics and tennis. She also played the piano and had an interest in music and performance that she manifested as a member of a drama club and a circus club. Her early interest in sports and music has been cited as a foundation for her future success in sports aerobics.

At age fourteen, after seeing sports aerobic on television for the first time, she became strongly interested in the sport but was barred from participation because of her age. At age sixteen she began training with the goal of competing when she turned eighteen. However, to her fortune a novice category for athletes ages sixteen to eighteen was introduced to the Finnish Championships that very year. Thus Piili was able to compete immediately.

== Career ==
After graduating from secondary school in Lappeenranta, Piili moved to the town of Jyväskylä in Central Finland to train. She won her first World Championship in 2001 at a competition held in Agadir, Morocco. While in Morocco for that competition, she consumed bacteria-tainted food and developed an infection in her back that impeded her training for a period. She recovered and proceeded to win the 2004 World Championship in Adelaide, South Australia, the 2005 World Championship in Ghent, Belgium, and the 2006 World Championship in Rotterdam, Netherlands.

In addition to her four World Championships, Piili is a four-time winner of the European Championship and a five-time winner of the Finnish Championship, and holds a total of fourteen World and European Championship medals.

In 2004, as the "most successful representative of Sports Aerobics", Piili was selected as "Aerobic athlete of the year" by the Finnish Sports Federation. She almost won the title of top Finnish athlete overall, but lost to the alpine skier Tanja Poutiainen.

Piili has appeared twice on the Finnish game show Kymppitonni. She also did a segment on the Finnish television show Fit 4 You in which she kickbikes up Paloheinä hill in Helsinki.

She currently still lives in Jyväskylä, Central Finland.
