= Paloheinä =

Coordinates: 60°15′N 24°56′E

Paloheinä Svedängen
- Helsinki Subdivision
- Interactive map of Paloheinä
- Country: Finland
- Region: Uusimaa
- Sub-region: Greater Helsinki
- Municipality: Helsinki
- District: Northern
- Subdivision regions: none
- Area: 1.72 km^{2} (0.66 sq mi)
- Population (2005): 6,035
  - Density: 3,509/km^{2} (9,090/sq mi)
- Postal codes: 00670
- Subdivision number: 351
- Neighbouring subdivisions: Länsi-Pakila, Itä-Pakila, Torpparinmäki, Haltiala

Paloheinä (Swedish Svedängen) is one of four quarters of the Tuomarinkylä district in Northern Helsinki, Finland. Described by the municipality as "a place where habitation, traditional agricultural milieus, and the forest meet", the Paloheinä recreation area is the northern continuation of Helsingin keskuspuisto, Helsinki's "Central Park".

== Recreation ==
Paloheinä is Helsinki's main center for outdoor activities. Over 200 competitions are held in Paloheinä each year in sports such as skiing, cross-country running, and orienteering.

=== Airsoft ===
Local airsoft players stage mock combat in the wooded areas of Paloheinä.

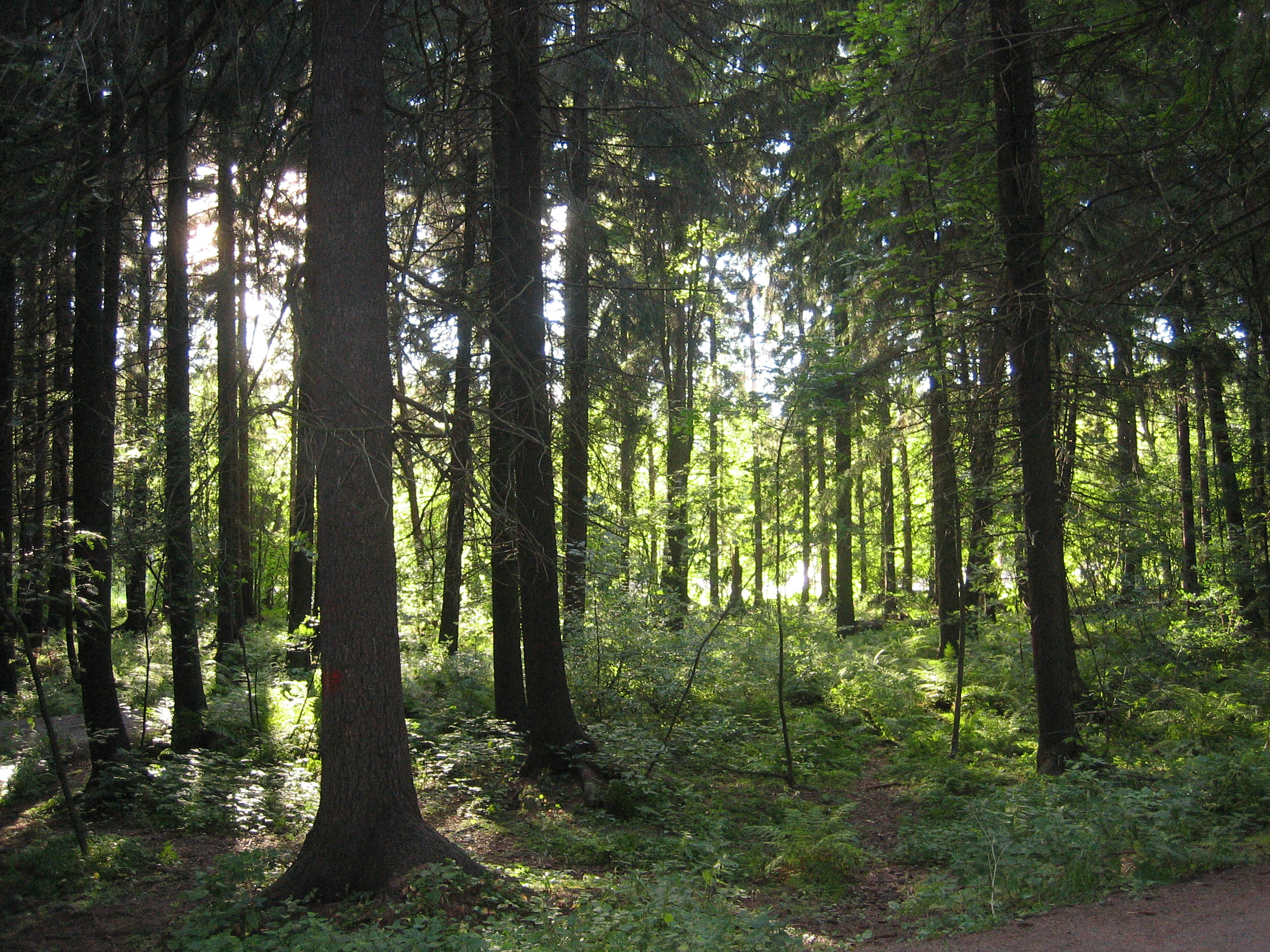
Summer in Keskuspuisto

=== Golf ===
A golf course known as "Helsinki City Golf" is available for a fee.

=== Hiking ===
There are many paths popular for hiking as well as a hiking lodge with showers, a café, and saunas (heated three days a week).

=== Nature tours ===
In the summer, guided nature tours are organised from the Paloheinä lodge.

=== Nordic walking ===
Nordic walkers seen every evening at the Paloheinä area. There are organized Nordic walking events at Paloheinä twice a week. In August 2007, Nordic walkers gathered at the Paloheinä recreational area to celebrate the tenth anniversary of their activity.

=== Skiing ===
In winter, Paloheinä is Helsinki's main area for skiing, especially cross-country skiing ( a sport immensely popular among Finns). The Paloheinä Skiing Centre has a number of well-maintained skiing tracks to suit skiers of all levels. They also offer rented equipment including skis, snowshoes and pulkka.

== The hill ==
Paloheinän mäki is a prominent sloping hill 120 m long and 38 m high which is the best ski slope in the area.

Tiia Piili did a segment on the Finnish television show "Fit 4 You" in which she ascends this "famous hill" using a kickbike.

== Library ==
The Paloheinä Library, a branch of the Helsinki City Library, is located at Paloheinäntie 22.

== Buses ==
Helsinki public transportation in buses 63 and 67 go to the library. Buses 66 and 66A have their final stops near the hill.
