= Ligiron =

Scooter-like vehicle used in the Philippines

Ligiron (Visayan word for “to roll”) is a 4-wheeled cart made of wood with bamboo flooring serving as its framework. Originally, it is utilized by farmers to bring their home-grown products from the mountains to the town's market or to the city market of Dumaguete 9 kilometers west of Valencia (Negros Oriental, Philippines).

== Contraption design ==
Like a scooter, the ligiron is a medium of transportation made from hardwood such as tugas, tisa, bamboo, mahogany and other sturdy wood that can be found in Negros Oriental. The rider sits and places his feet on the bamboo flooring and maneuver the four-wheeled vehicle using the scooter-like handles. The ligiron devise needs to start from the top of any downward terrain because the descending force is the only power that keeps the ligiron rolling. The wood and bamboo utilized in the devise are fastened together using rubber from second-hand or worn-out tires, nails and wood glue to keep them in one piece. The brakes are made of rubber. The ligiron does not use gas or battery. The lubricant used on it is from shredded cocoa seeds. The original models do not have any braking mechanism making the driver rely only on foot brakes.

== Racing ==
The first ligiron competition was organized by Nicky Dumapit which took place in 2013 in Camp Lookout, Barangay Bongbong, Valencia, Negros Oriental. In the 2018 race, there were 20 participating racers competing in three divisions, namely, beginners, elite/experts, and the long jump. With the launching of the first Ligiron Race in 2013, the annual event has currently acquired an international following as the novel “King of the Downhill Trail” caught the attention and fascination of global extreme sport enthusiasts.
