= Kickbike =

Type of scooter

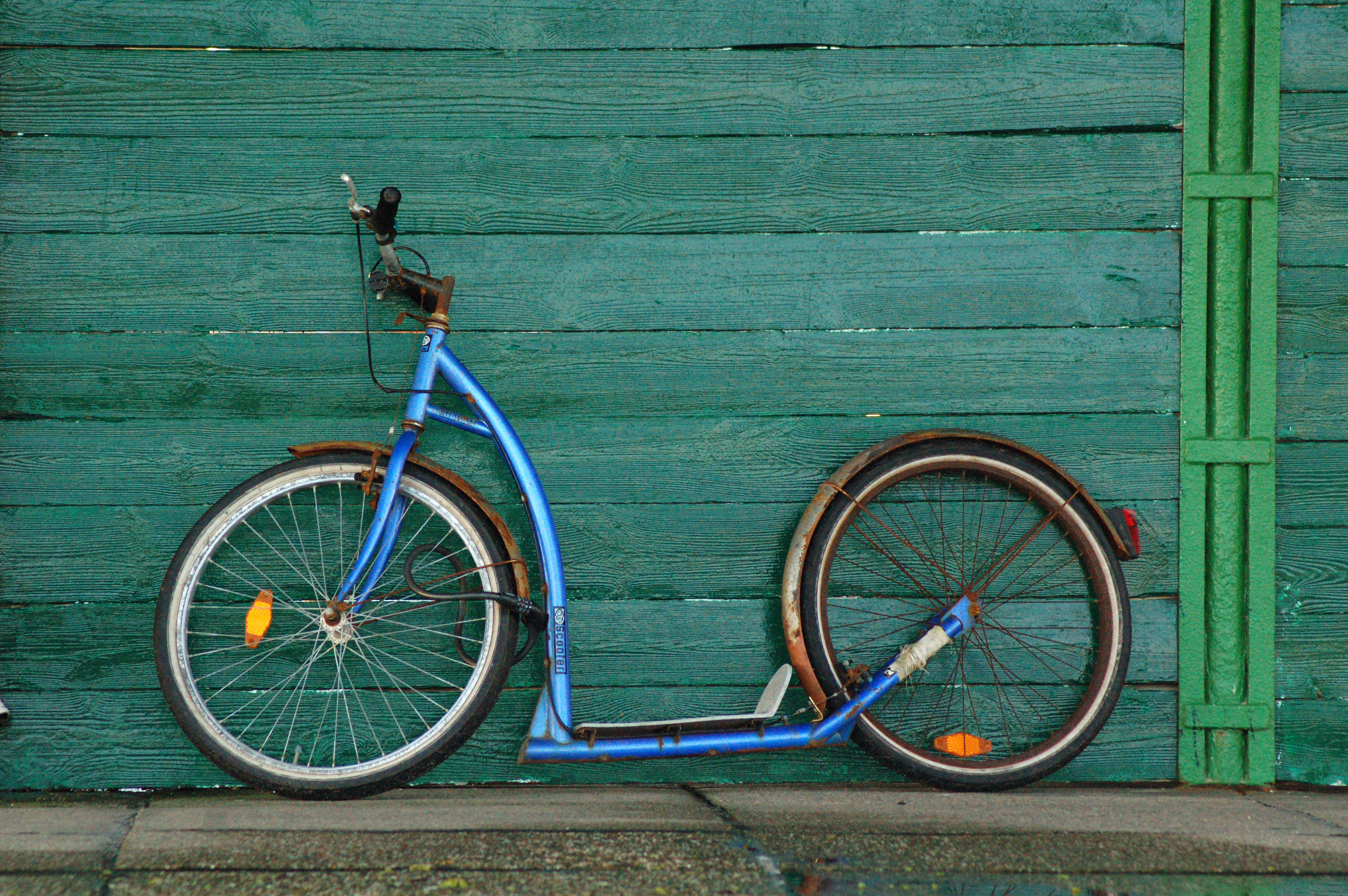
Kickbike in Heligoland

A kickbike (also known as a bikeboard, footbike, or pedicycle) is a type of kick scooter and is a human-powered street vehicle with a handlebar, deck, and wheels propelled by a rider pushing off the ground. The kickbike often has a standard-size bicycle front wheel and a much smaller rear wheel, which allows for a much faster ride.

== History ==
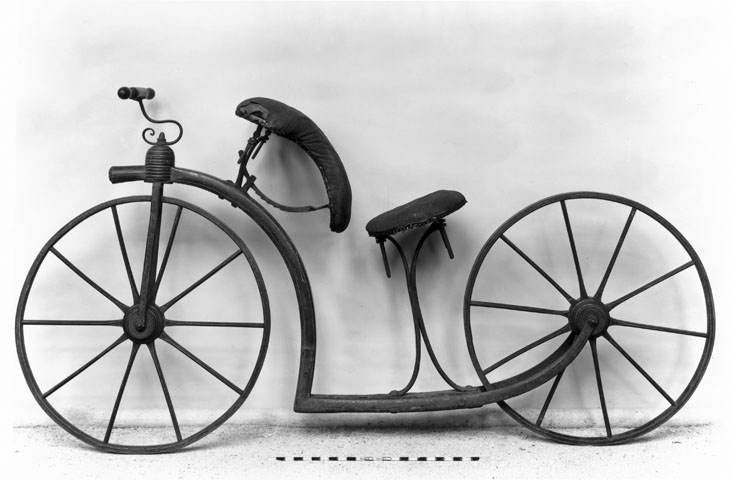
A similar vehicle had been produced by Denis Johnson in 1819

The modern kickbike was developed in the early 1990s by Hannu Vierikko, who was active in kicksled racing. In 1994, Vierikko founded Kickbike Worldwide in Finland to produce and market kickbikes. Independent coverage has described kickbikes as an evolution of earlier human-powered scooters and kicksled-inspired designs.

== Use ==
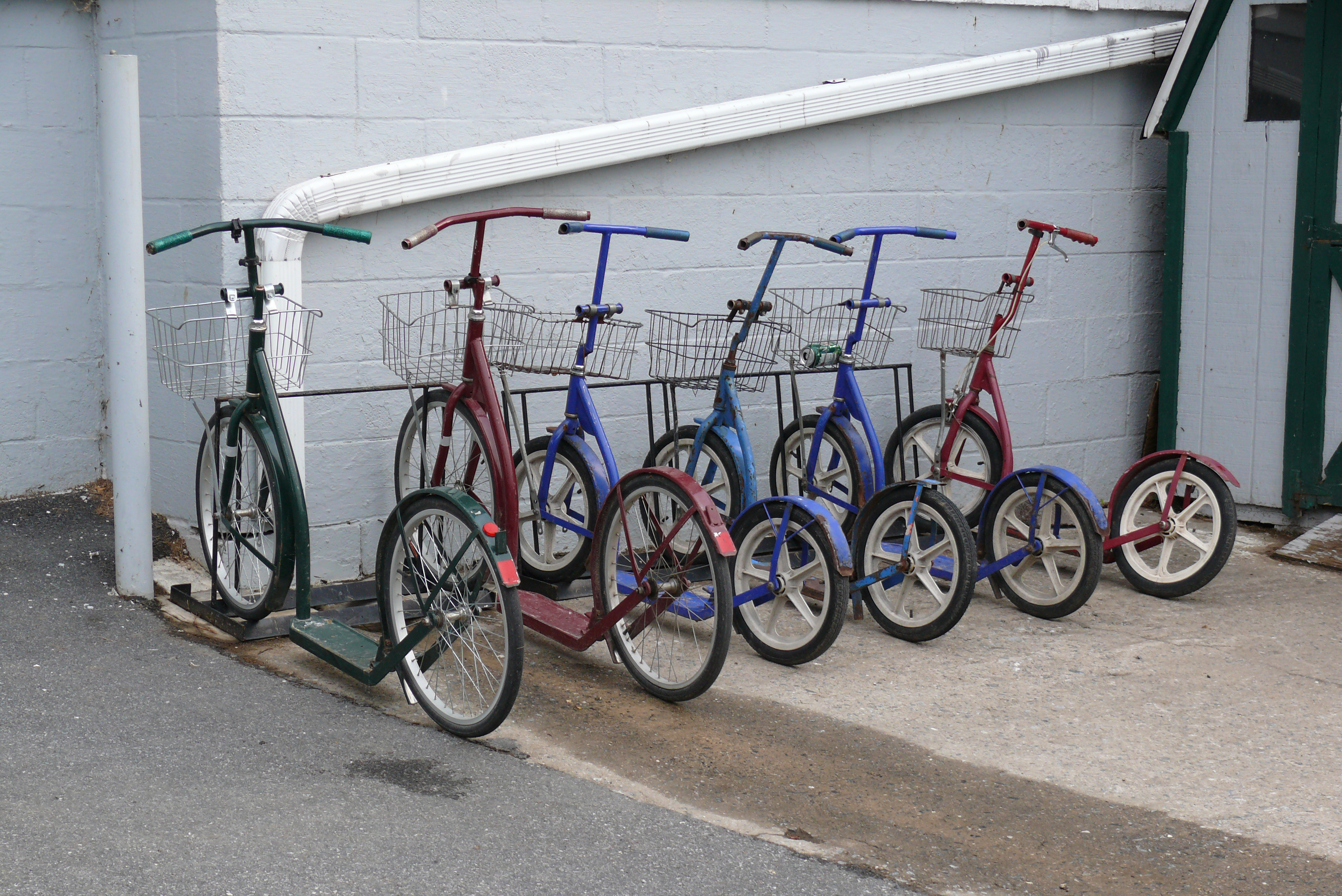
Amish kick scooters

Amish communities also use kickbikes in preference to bicycles, for several reasons, including the safety and unaffordability of early bicycles, and the risk of gearing mechanisms as a source of vanity. Kickbikes can be used for dryland mushing, also called "dog scootering."

== Sport ==
Some former world champions include Jan Vlasek and Alpo Kuusisto.

== Gallery ==
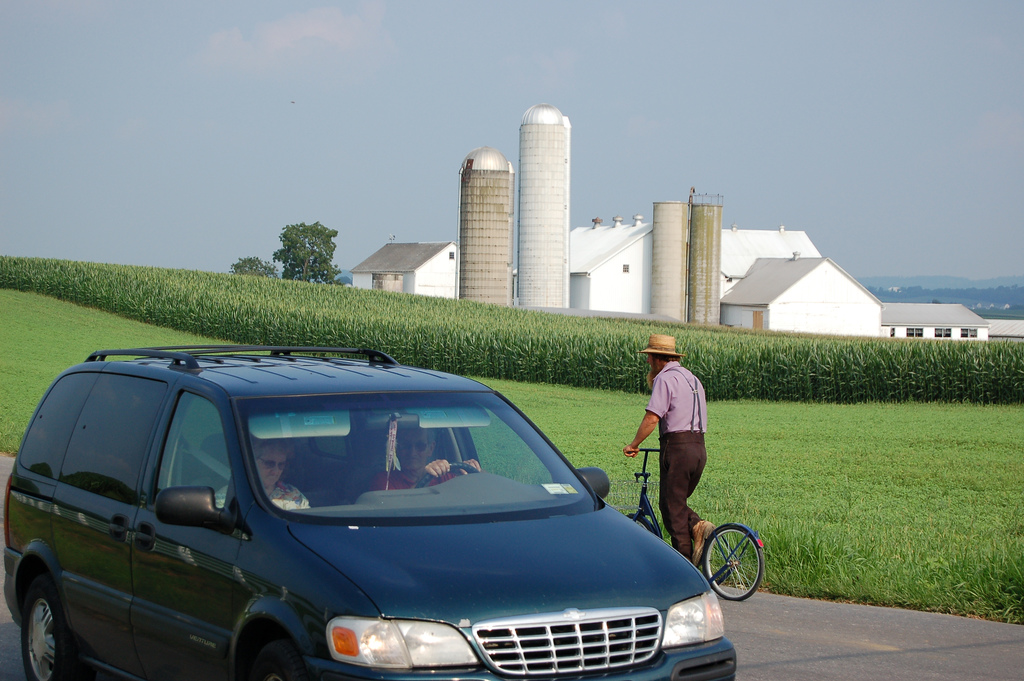
Amish adult using kickbike, 20 July 2006

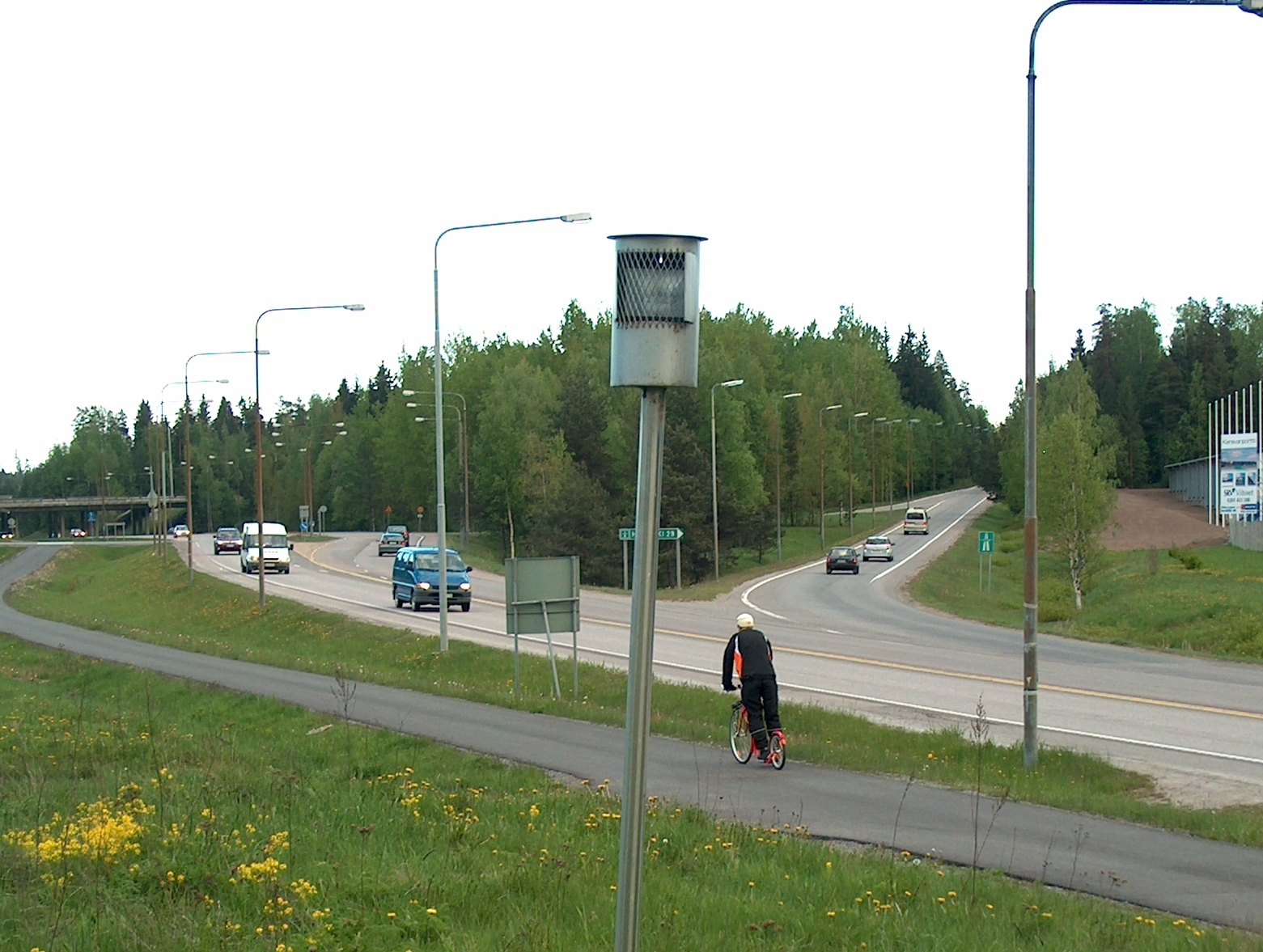
A man with kickbike in Kerava, Finland, 2008

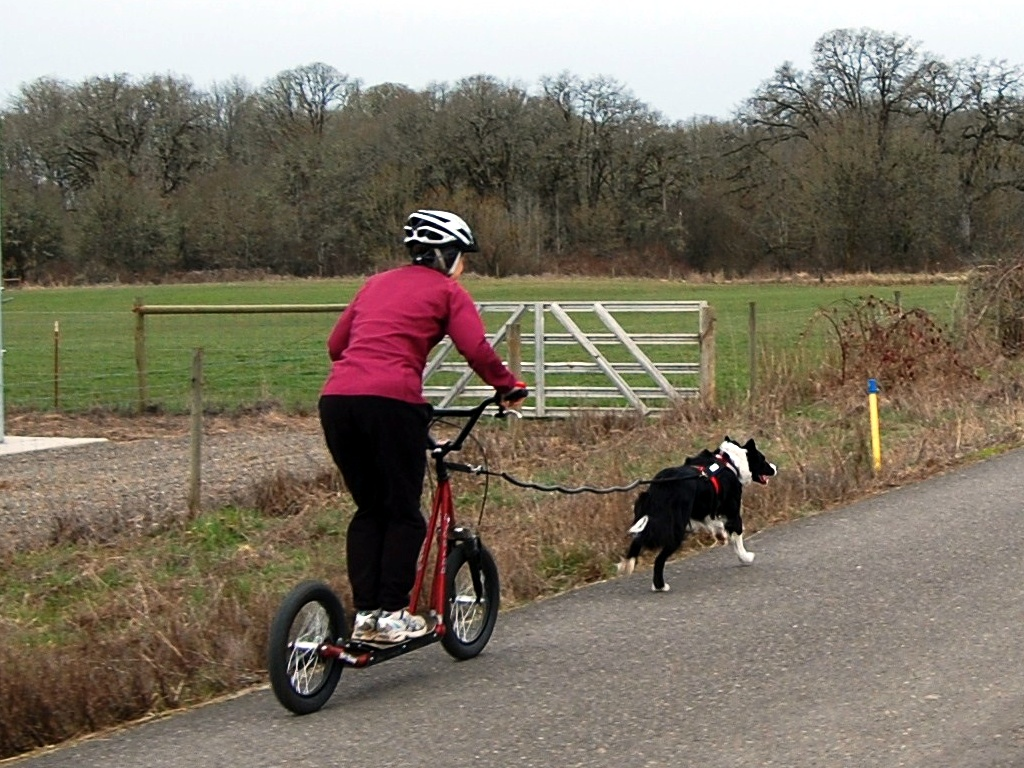
A woman on the Diggler scooter being pulled by a dog, dry land mushing, 2009

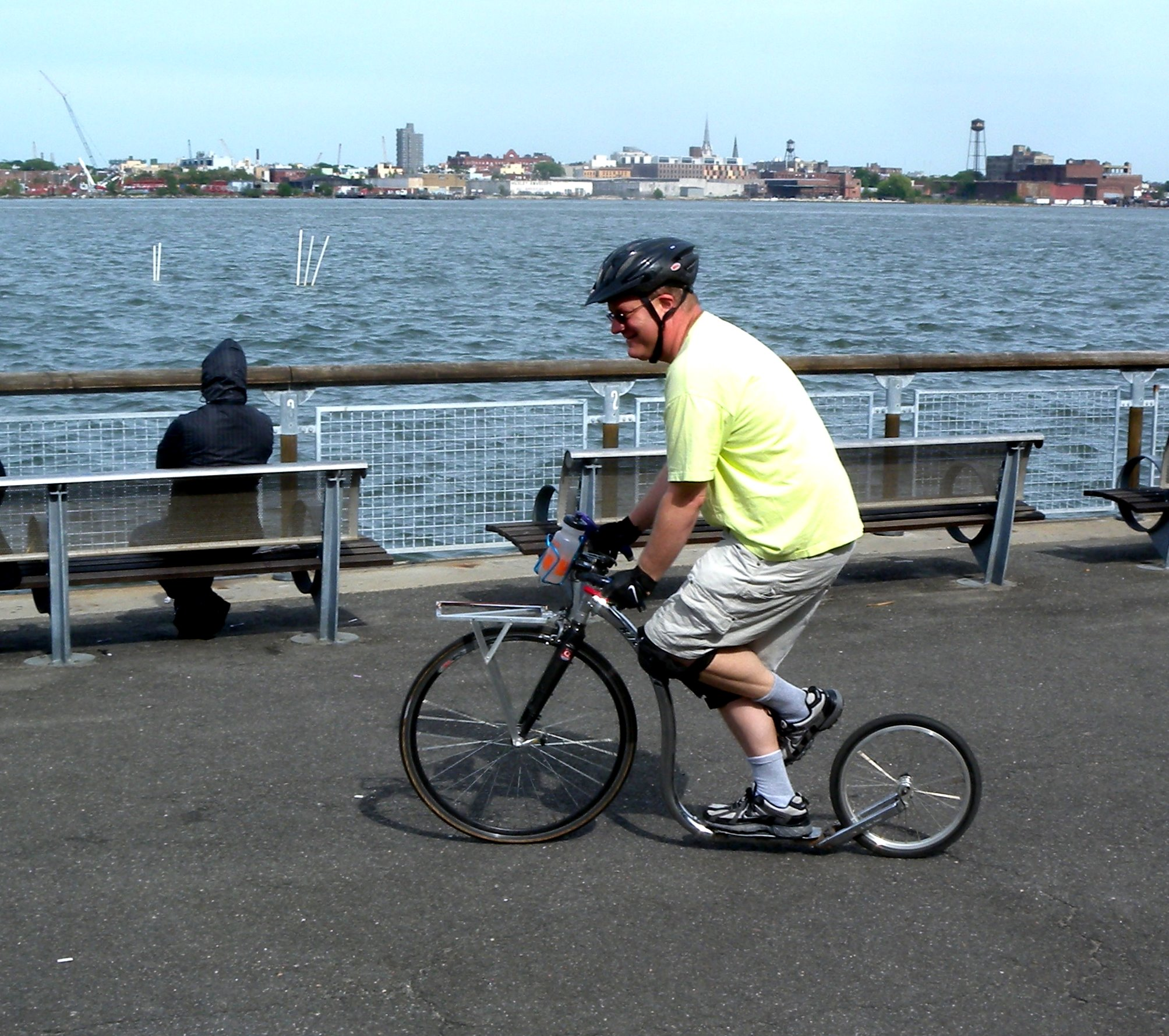
Stuyvesant Cove Park, New York City, 2010

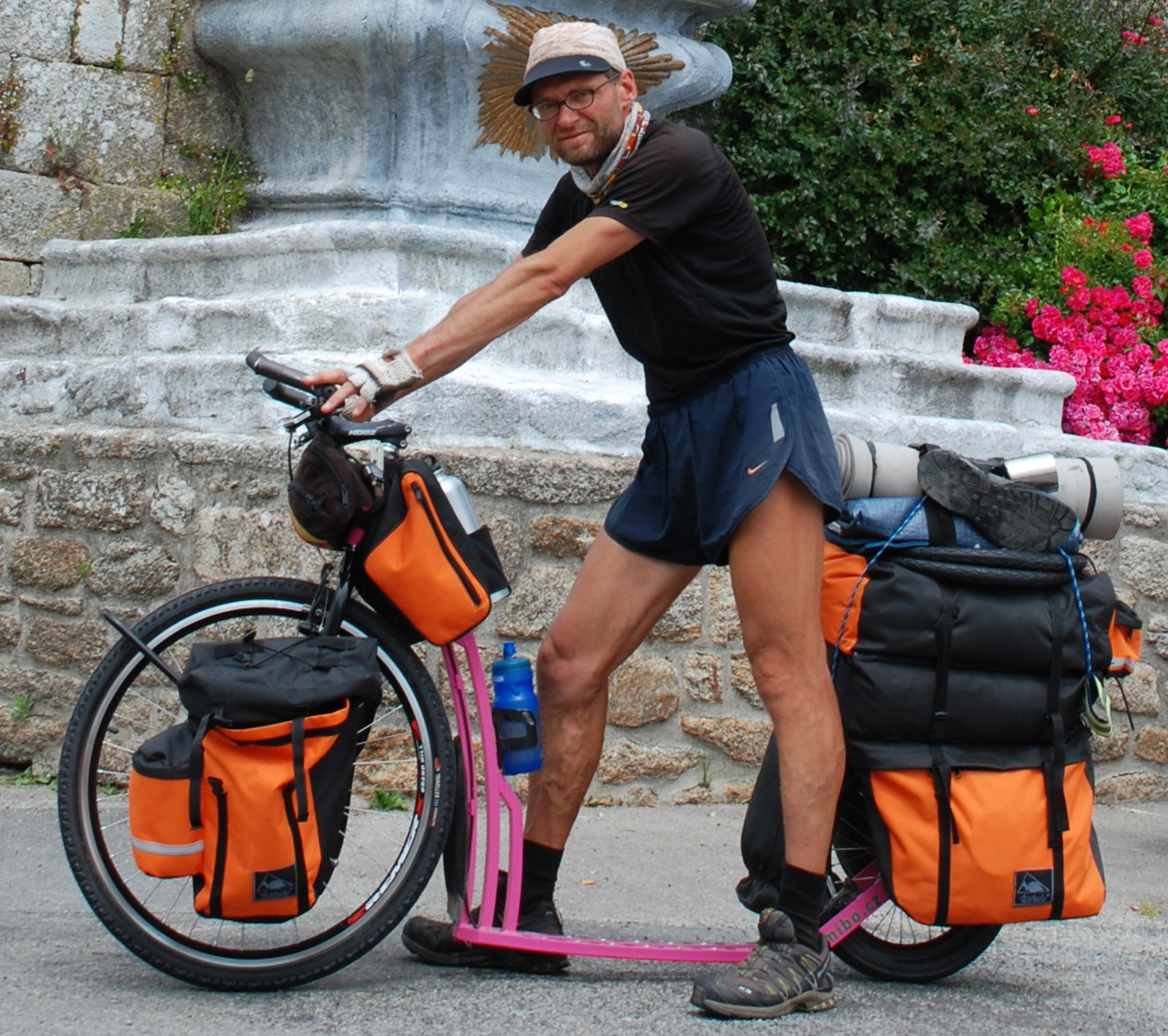
Travelling with kickbike, 2011

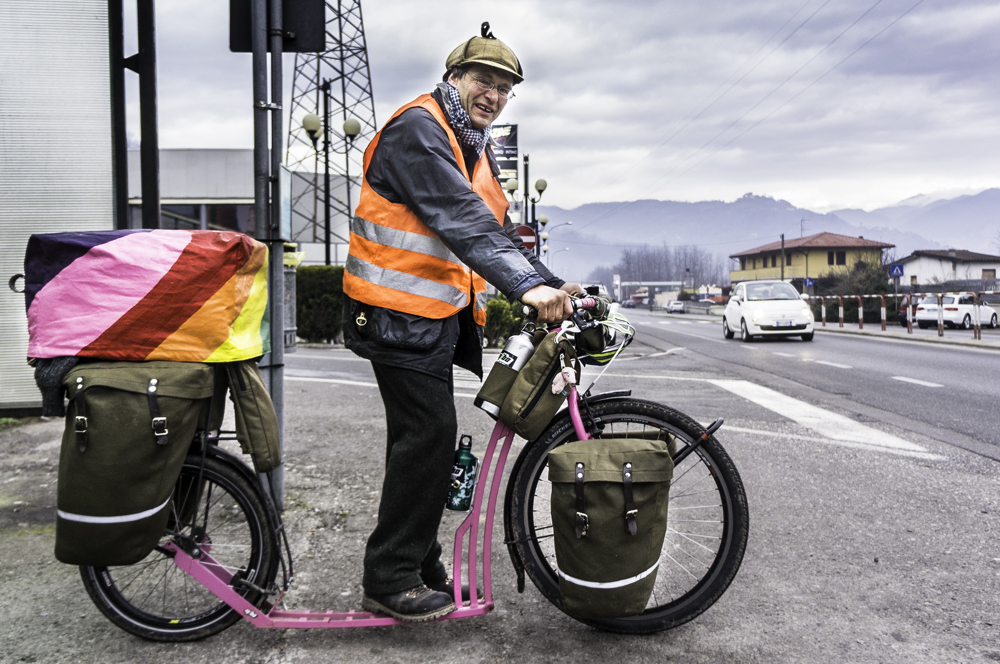
Tuscany, Italy, 2015

=== Sport ===
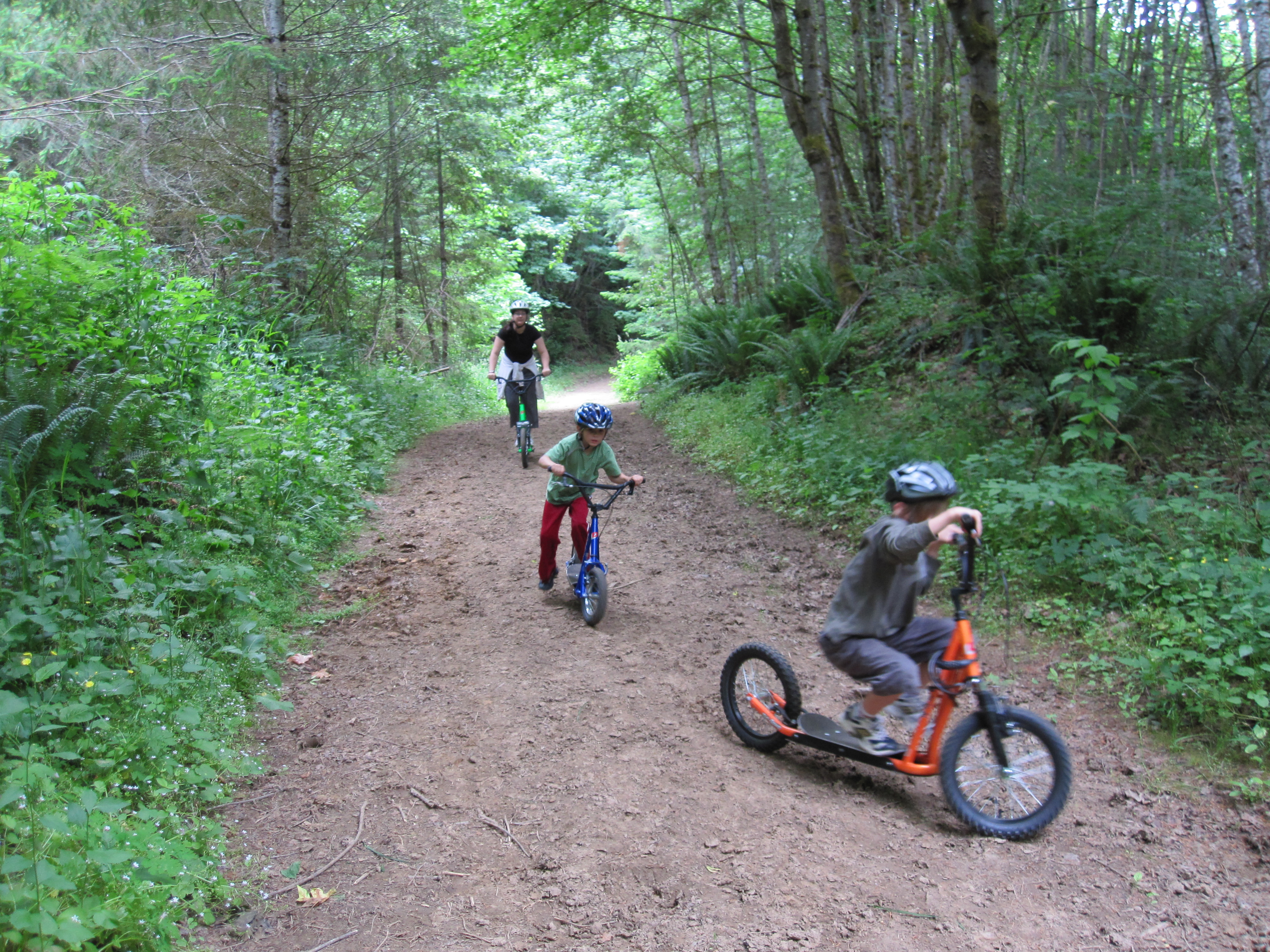
Offroad scootering

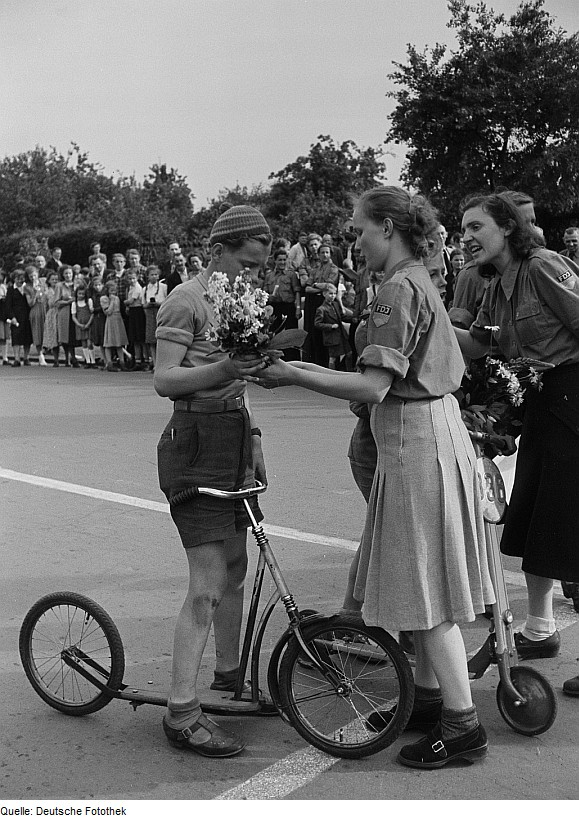
Award ceremony at the roller race in Leipzig-Marienbrunn 1952

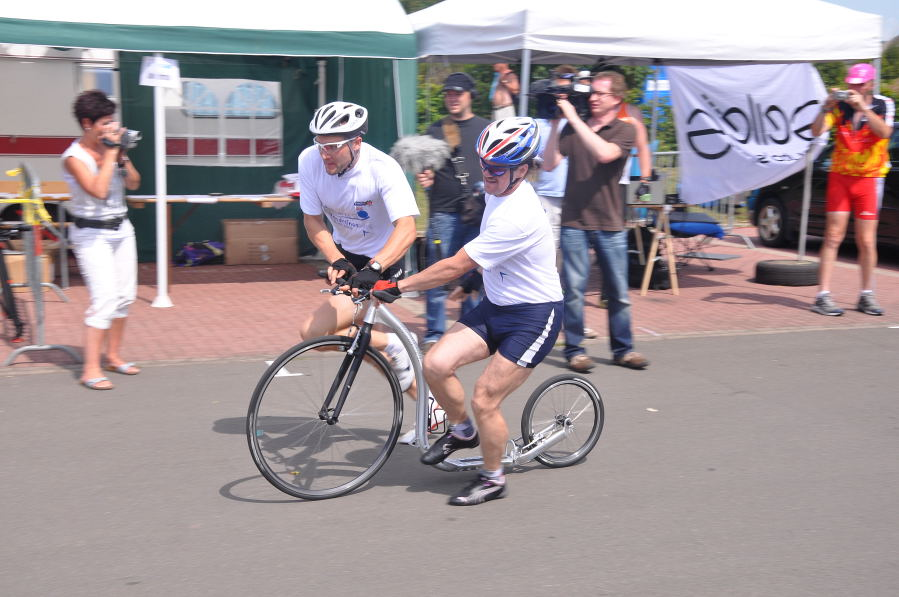
2009

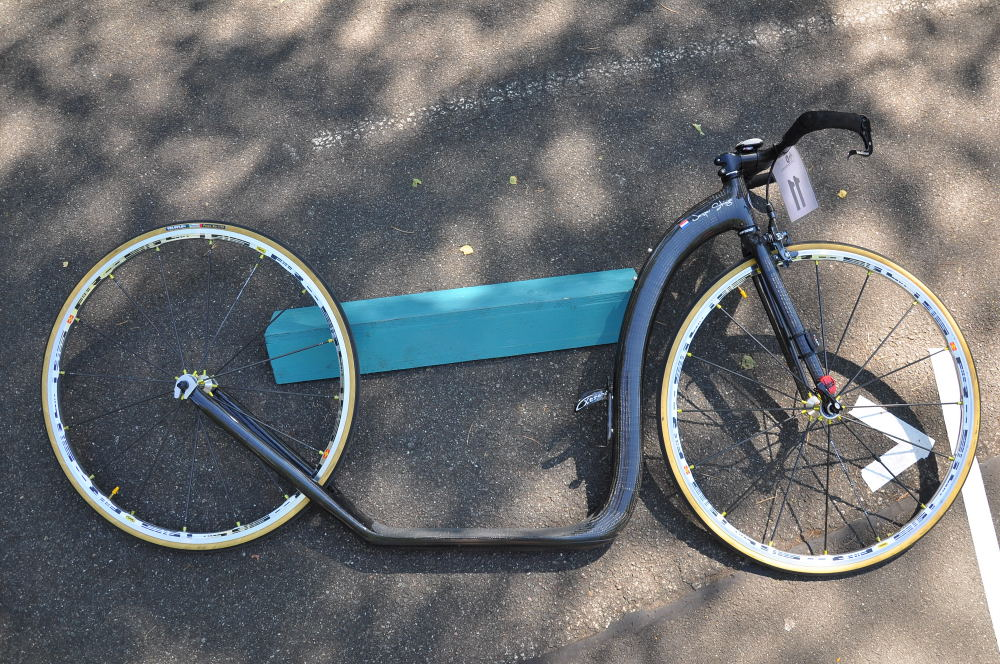
Carbon scooter in Frankenhain 2010 (German EuroCup)

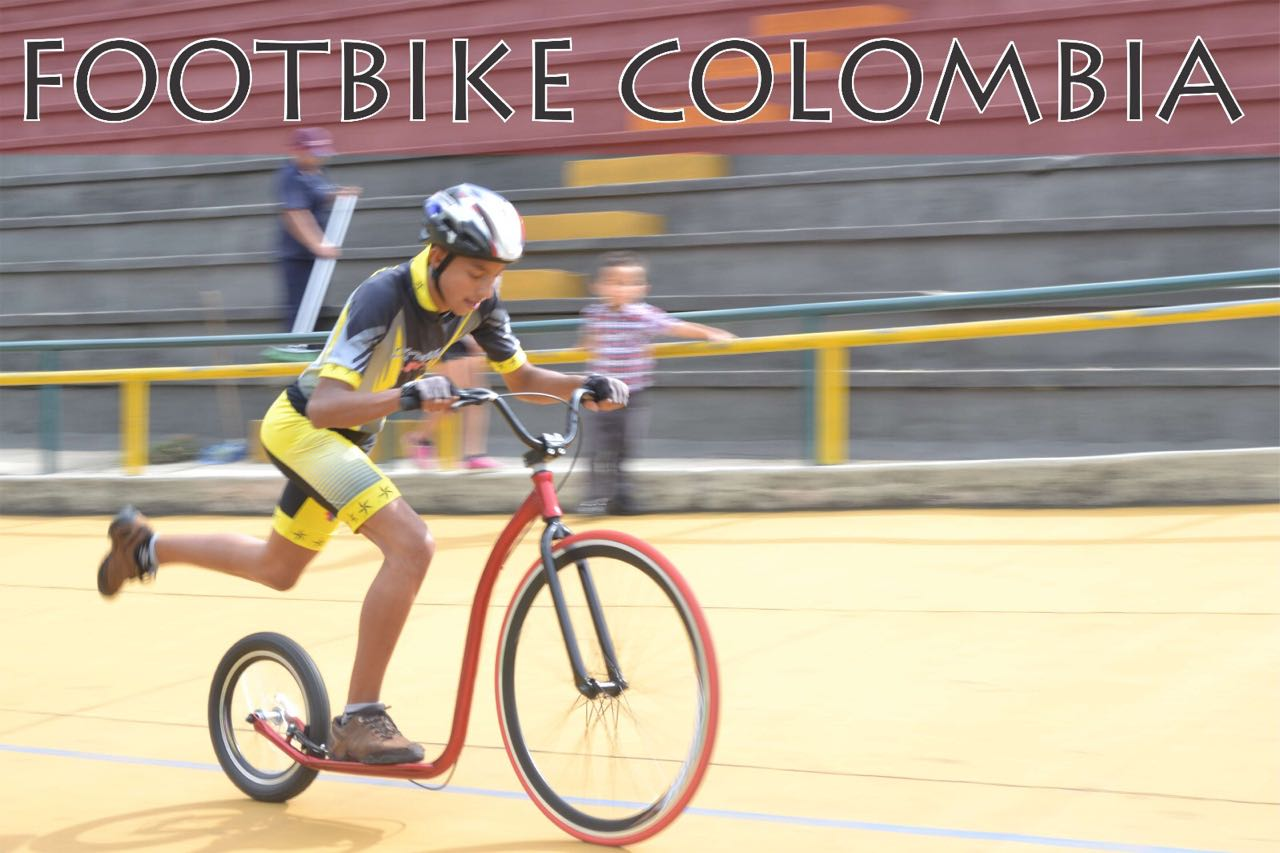
Footbike Colombia 2016

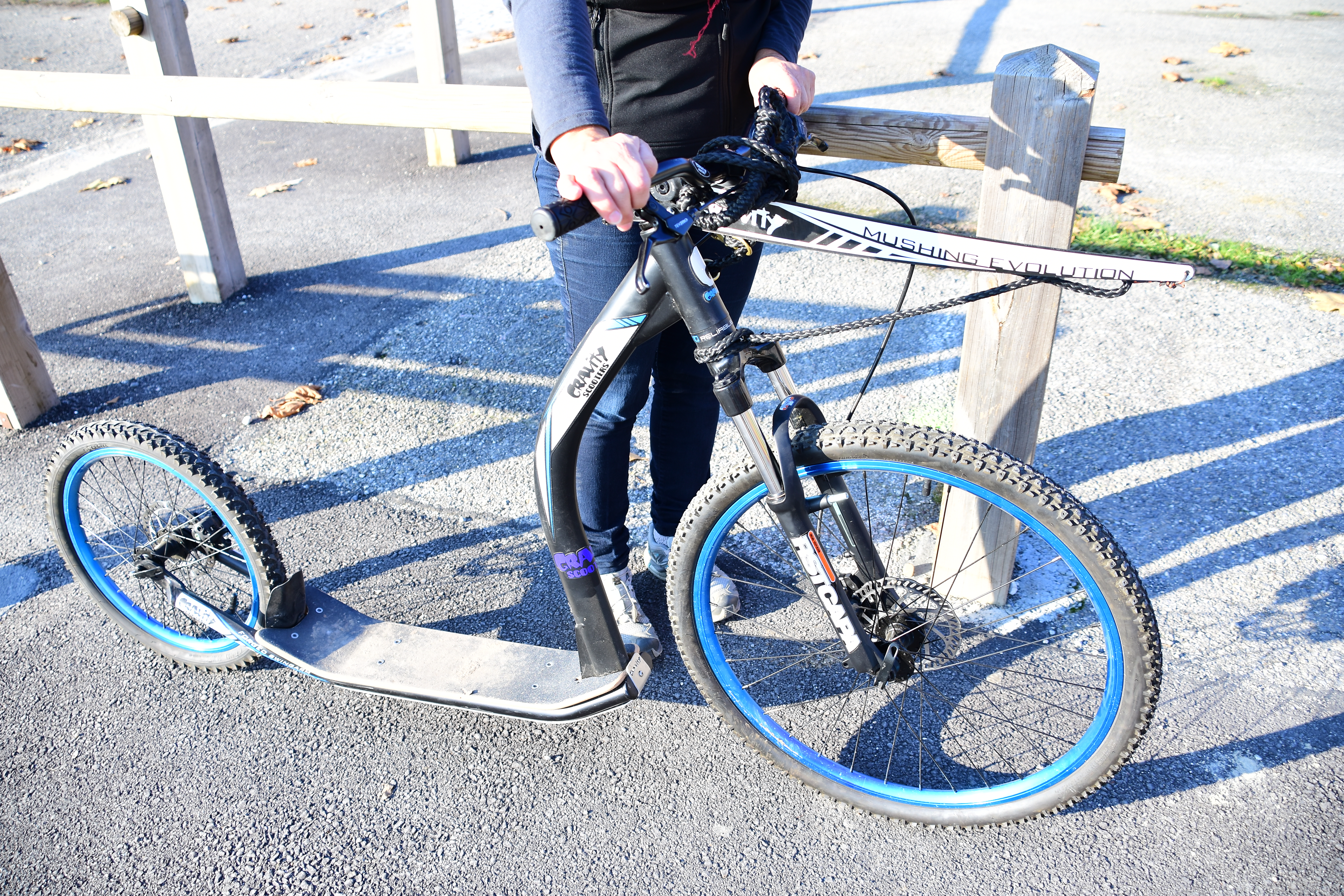
Kickbike for Mushing

== See also ==
- Balance bicycle
