= Micro Mobility Systems =

Swiss urban-vehicles company

- Type: Private
- Industry: Sporting goods, toys, electric vehicles
- Founded: 1996; 30 years ago
- Founder: Wim Ouboter
- Headquarters: Küsnacht, canton of Zürich, Switzerland
- Key people: Wim Ouboter (CEO)
- Revenue: CHF 60 million (financial year 2014)
- Number of employees: 57 (September 2015)
- Website: www.micro.ms

Micro Mobility Systems (Micro) is a Swiss family-run company that develops and markets micro-mobility products, including scooters and kickboards for children and adults. It has also developed the electric vehicle Microlino. The company was founded in 1996.

== History ==
Wim Ouboter developed the kick scooter in Zürich in 1990 as a short-distance, last-mile transport solution for adults. His early scooters were collapsible and designed for adult use.

Micro Mobility Systems was founded in 1996. In 1998, U.S. sports company K2 agreed to market the kickboard. Ouboter also partnered with JD.com's bicycle unit in China for production, and sales began in Japan in 1999. Micro scooters were unveiled at an international show in 1999. By 2001, Micro Mobility Systems had sold 2 million non-motorized scooters.

Micro first electrified its scooters in 2013. In 2016, the company announced the Microlino, a compact electric car inspired by the BMW Isetta, and showed a prototype at the Geneva Motor Show.

In 2020, Fast Company ranked Micro Mobility Systems fifth on its list of the most innovative companies in Europe. Also in 2020, Mercedes-Benz partnered with Micro to create a co-branded electric scooter.

== Company overview ==
Micro Mobility Systems is headquartered in Küsnacht, near Zürich. Founder Wim Ouboter is chief executive of the company. His wife, Janine, runs the finances, and Ouboter works with his sons Merlin and Oliver, who are part of the management board. Production and distribution are outsourced; the company focuses on product development, marketing, and order processing and shipping. Micro Mobility Systems is listed as a member of 1% for the Planet.

== Products ==
=== Scooters ===
Micro's product line includes two- and three-wheeled scooters for children and adults. The scooter range includes models such as the Micro Mini and Micro Maxi for children and the foldable Micro Sprite.

=== Microlino ===
The Microlino is a compact electric vehicle developed by Micro Mobility Systems and inspired by the BMW Isetta. A prototype was shown at the Geneva Motor Show in 2016. A redesigned version, the Microlino 2.0, was unveiled in 2020.

== Awards and recognition ==
Micro products have received Red Dot Design Awards, including for the mini2go (2014) and the micro kids luggage junior (2021). In 2016, the Mini Micro Deluxe and Maxi Micro Deluxe received Gold awards from the Oppenheim Toy Portfolio Best Toy Awards.

== See also ==
- Micro Scooters
