= Kicksled =

Type of sled

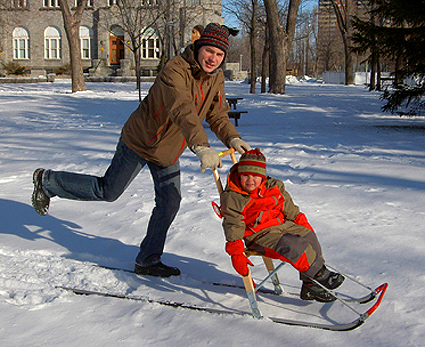
Modern kicksled with child passenger

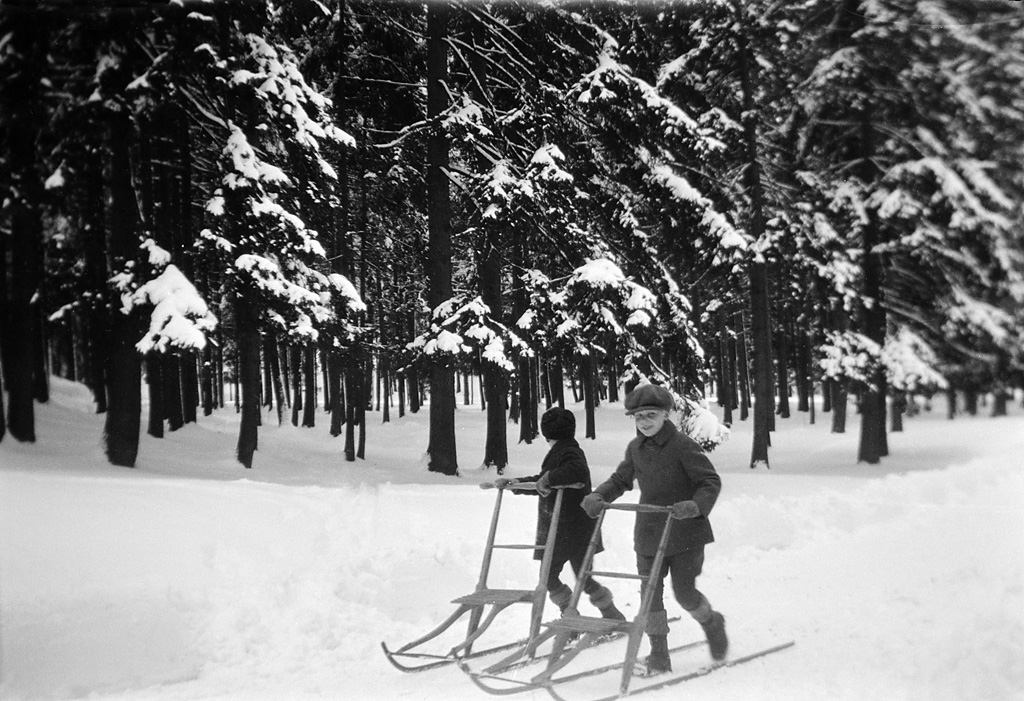
Kicksleds in Sweden, 1922

The kicksled or spark is a small sled consisting of a chair mounted on a pair of flexible metal runners that extend backward to about twice the chair's length. The sled is propelled by kicking (sparka or sparke in the Scandinavian languages) the ground by foot. There is a handlebar attached to the top of the chair back.

== Design ==
The typical adult sized sled has runners about 2 m (79 in) long, spaced 400 mm (15.7 in) apart. The steel runner blades are about 5 mm (0.2 in) wide.The handlebars are about 900 mm (35.4 in) above ground.

The kicksled is driven forward by the driver standing on one runner, kicking backwards on the ground with the other foot, hence the name. The flexibility of the runners allows the driver to steer the kicksled by twisting the handlebars. One can have a passenger or luggage on the chair seat. The kicksled can also be used as a dog sled.

A kicksled is designed to be used on hard, slippery surfaces like ice or hardpacked snow. To kicksled in deeper, more powdery snow, extra-wide plastic snow runners are attached to the standard, thin runners of the sled. On very smooth, bare ice, the use of traction devices like spiked shoes or crampons improves kicking force. On level ground, one can easily reach a speed of 15 km/h (9 mph) to 20 km/h (12 mph), and much faster on downhill section or with a strong tail wind.

The kicksled is in common use in Sweden, Norway, Finland and Russia especially where roads are not sanded or salted. Kicksleds are growing in popularity in Canada. Kicksleds in Canada are used as mini mushing sleds with dogs as well as the traditional method of winter transportation. Stereotypically it is used by old women in the countryside.

It is also an excellent means of travelling over frozen lakes to go ice fishing or just to explore the lake. Kicksledding on lake ice shares many of the same features as tour skating.

Some models also include a wheel kit allowing the user to transform the sled into a kind of walking aid for summer use. This type is especially popular amongst the elderly.

=== Names ===
Kicksled is a direct translation of the Finnish word potkukelkka. Estonian calls it either a 'pushsled' (tõukekelk) or 'Finnish sled' (Soome kelk). In Russian, it is known as the 'Finnish sled' (финские сани). Some other possible translations are kicker and chair-sled.

== History ==
The first definite record of a kicksled was in a newspaper in northern Sweden around 1870. The kicksleds of that era had stiff wooden runners and were heavy. In 1909 the design of the modern kicksled with flexible metal runners was introduced by the Swedish factory Orsasparken, which quickly became standard in Sweden, Finland and Norway. A significant change took place in the development of the kicksled, when electrical engineer Oskari Terhi from Salo Finland developed iron legs for it in 1900.

In 1893 the French language Popular science magazine, La Nature, described the kicksled in the article "Un Traineau Suédois: Le Sparkstötting". In 1894 this article was translated into English and published as "A Swedish Sled :The Sparkstotting", in the magazine Scientific American".

== Racing ==
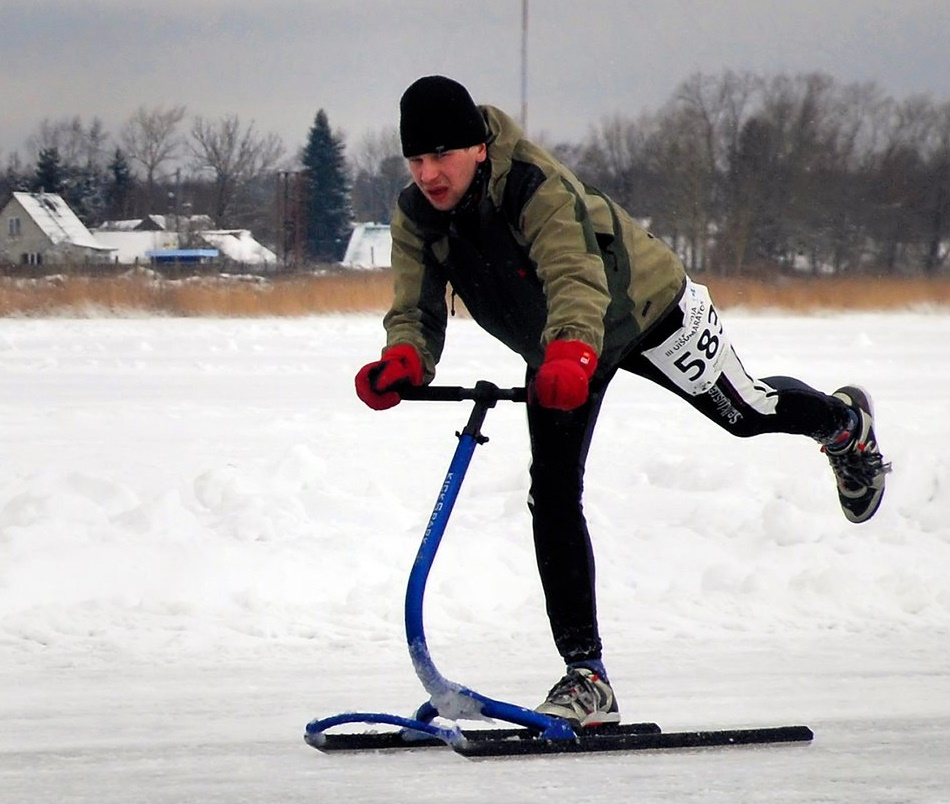
Kickspark racer

In the years 1890 to 1910 kicksled racing was a popular sport, especially in Sweden. Kicksled racing was a major event in the Nordic Games, which were the ancestor of the Winter Olympics.

Around 1990 kicksled racing was revived as a serious sport in Finland. There are races of up to 100 kilometres (62 mi) long and the average speed is around 30 km/h (19 mph). Often the kicksled races are held in conjunction with marathon speed skating races on natural ice; the kicksleds use the same ice track as the skaters.

A light-weight racing kicksled model is mass-produced by the Finnish kicksled company ESLA. Another racing and sport purposed aluminium-alloy based ultralight kicksled - the Kickspark is produced by Kickbike Worldwide in Finland.

In Canada, the kick sled has been modified for dog sports. A bridle is attached to the kick sled, and a gangline to that, with one to three dogs pulling. This small sled is useful for the urban dog owner, as it is lighter and easier to transport than a full scale dog sled. Kick sled races are now being held, with teams racing at times comparable to skijorers.

Norways's Geilo Ski Resort boasts an annual Kicksled World Championship every January, while Hurdal, Norway, puts on the Kicksled Downhill World Championship every February.
