= Trikke =

Three-wheel personal vehicle

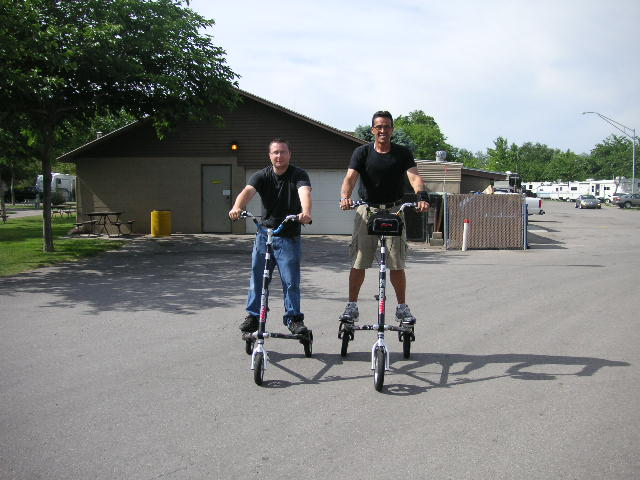
The Trikke works by shifting body weight

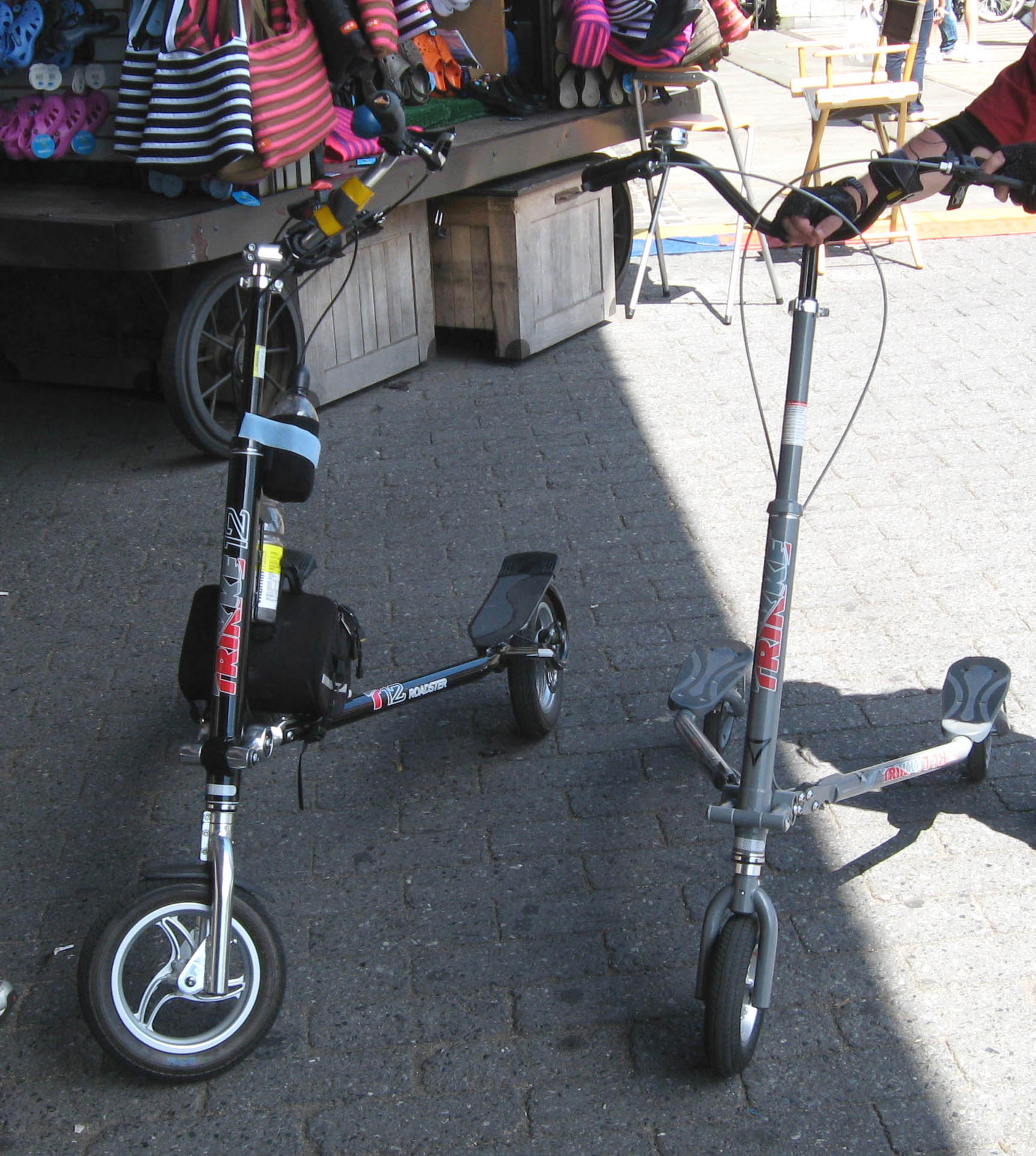
Two Trikkes

Video of Trikke climbing a hill

The Trikke (/ˈtraɪk/ tr-EYE-k; also known as a wiggle scooter, scissor scooter, carver scooter, Y scooter, or V scooter) is a chainless, pedalless, personal vehicle with a three-wheel frame. The rider stands on two foot platforms above the two rear wheels and steers the vehicle with handlebars attached to the lone front wheel. The cambering system is designed to provide a stable, three-point platform that lets the rider lean into turns while all three wheels remain in contact with the ground. There are several variations of the Trikke, from body-powered fitness machines, to battery-powered transportation and personal mobility vehicles.

Brand name Trikkes are manufactured by the company Trikke Tech based in Buellton, California.

A body-powered Trikke is propelled using a motion that moves the vehicle along a curved, S-shaped path (called "carving"). The rider moves the vehicle from side to side, turning the handlebars and leaning the front structure while moving one's body weight toward the side one is turning into. The weight of the rider during a turn (or "carve") is placed mainly on the foot at the outside of the turn. The inside foot will support very little weight and the rider will often lift the heel of this foot during the turn.

The resulting motion is similar to slalom skiing, a tic-tac move on a skateboard, or one's leg movements during roller skating.

A Trikke can be propelled without the need to push off with one's foot. There are many variations of Trikke-riding techniques as riders place different emphasis on the elements of the movement.

Using the carving motion, a body-powered Trikke can achieve speeds of nearly 30 km/h (19 mph), but more often, riders cruise around with average speeds in the 15 km/h (9.3 mph) range. A Trikke can be ridden uphill, albeit at a reduced speed.

Since 2009, Trikke Tech, Inc. has manufactured electric versions of the Trikke, which have been adopted by various law enforcement and security companies as an alternative to other personal electric vehicles. Additionally, many recreational riders now use electric Trikkes for personal transportation as well as hybrid fitness vehicles.

== History ==
In 1999, Brazilian engineer Gildo Beleski applied for a patent on an improved design for a three-wheel cambering vehicle with the US Patent Office. In 2000, he founded Trikke Tech in Southern California, shipping 100 frames from Brazil and assembling Trikkes in his garage.

Trikke three-wheel carving vehicles officially went on the market in 2002, and Time magazine named it one of the best inventions of that year.

In 2008, Trikke Tech CEO John Simpson said that in 2008, the company sold over 60,000 Trikkes.

Over half a million body-powered Trikkes have been sold.
