= Inline boarding =

There are several two-wheeled boards classifiable as inline boarding:

- Dirtsurfing, two mountain bike style wheels and a brake
- Freebord, two skateboard style wheels, plus another four for momentary stability
