= Mountainboarding =

Action sport

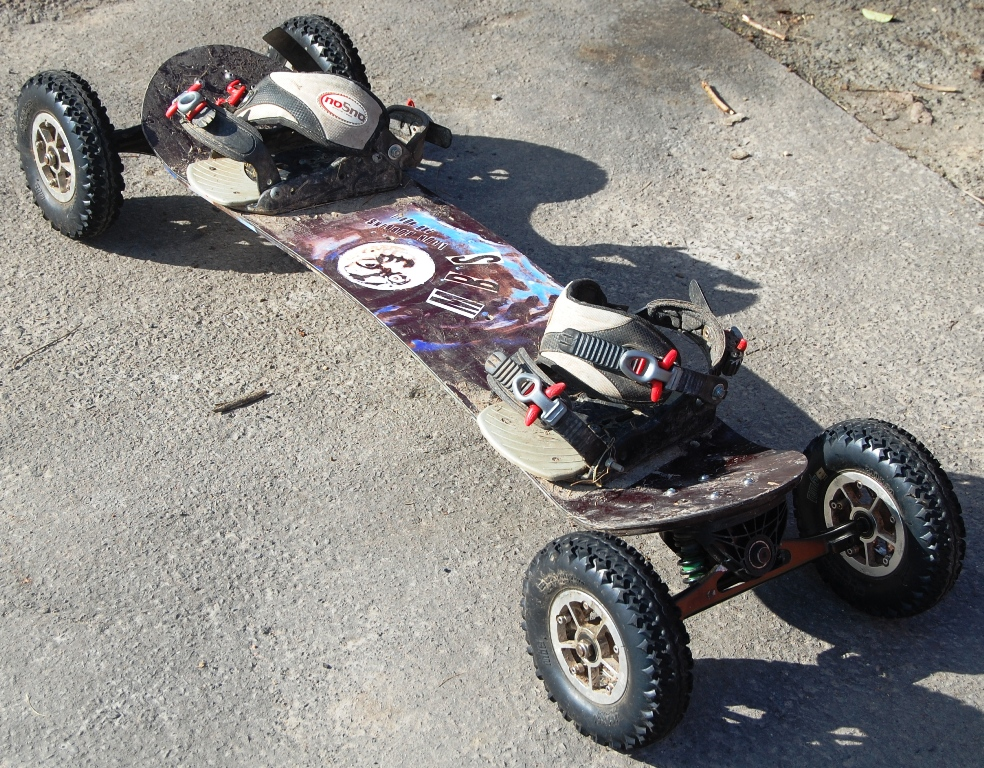
MBS Pro 100 Mountainboard with noSno soft bindings

Mountainboarding (MTB), also known as dirtboarding, off-road boarding, and all-terrain boarding (ATB), is an action sport derived from snowboarding. The sport was initially pioneered by James Stanley during a visit to the Matterhorn in the 1990s, where snow was not available. A mountainboard is made up of components including a deck, bindings (to secure the rider to the deck), four wheels with pneumatic tires, and two steering mechanisms known as trucks. Mountainboarders, also known as riders, ride specifically designed boardercross tracks, slopestyle parks, grass hills, woodlands, gravel tracks, streets, skateparks, ski resorts, BMX courses, and mountain bike trails. It is this ability to ride such a variety of terrain that makes mountainboarding unique from other board sports.

== History ==
=== Origins ===
Morton Hellig's 'Supercruiser Inc.' was the first company to manufacture and retail the 'All Terrain Dirtboard', patented in 1989. Mountainboarding (name coined by Jason Lee) began in the UK, the United States and Australia in 1992. Unknown to each other, riders from other Boardsports started to design, build, and eventually manufacture boards that could be ridden off-road. This desire to expand the possible terrain that a boarder can ride created the sport of Mountainboarding.

==== United Kingdom ====
Dave and Pete Tatham, Joe Inglis and Jim Aveline, whilst looking for an off-season alternative to surfing and snowboarding, began designing boards that could be ridden down hills. Inglis developed initial prototypes, and in 1992 noSno was started. Extensive research and development produced the noSno truck system which enabled the boards to be steered and remain stable at high speeds. NoSno boards utilized snowboard bindings and boots, with large tires for rough ground, and the option for a hand-operated hydraulic disc brake.

==== United States ====
In 1992, after having snowboarded at Heavenly Valley Resort in Northern California, friends Jason Lee, Patrick McConnell and Joel Lee went looking for an alternative for the summer season. Not finding anything suitable they co-founded Mountain Board Sports (MBS) in 1993 to build boards that they could use to carve down hills. The original MBS boards, known as 'Frame Boards' had a small wooden deck, metal posts to hold the rider's feet, a tubular metal frame connecting trucks which used springs to enable steering, thus create the carving sensation that the MBS co-founders sought. The first recorded mountainboarding act occurred in the summer of 1978. On a bet, skateboarder Mike Motta, residing in Medford, Massachusetts, navigated down a hill known as Seven Bumps in Malden, Massachusetts using a standard Franklin skateboard.

==== Australia ====
John Milne developed a three-wheeled version of a mountainboard in 1992 in his spare time during periods of very poor surf. It used a unique steering system to emulate surfing on land. It had three wheels and a skate-style deck with no bindings.

=== Mid-to-late nineties ===
From the early days of invention there has always been a competitive element in mountainboarding. Encompassing racing, freestyle and downhill, competitions have been organized in the USA since 1993 and in the UK since 1997. In the same year, the ATBA-UK (All Terrain Boarding Association), the national governing body for mountainboarding in the UK, was born. As a non-profit making organization it represented and promoted the sport by putting riders interests first, promoting safety, sanctioning events, providing training, and sourcing funding to put on the ATBA-UK National Series, an annual series of competitions. The competitions did much to promote the sport and in 1998 mountainboarding had an estimated participation of over 1 million athletes worldwide. The components evolved, and the sport continued to grow. MBS developed the open heel binding, the channel truck called the "eggshock", and the reverse V-Brake system and sold boards worldwide. In 1998 Maxtrack started distributing MBS mountainboards in the UK and Europe.

==== Future ====
Some powered mountain boards are gaining traction in the board enthusiast world. Small gas or electric motors are being attached to allow for mountainboarding to be done on flat ground or to climb hills rather than just downhill. Many DIY electric mountainboard builders are developing new drivetrains for their boards with electric motors, rivaling the power of small motorcycles, which could become the norm.

== Equipment ==
=== Board components ===
==== Deck ====
Mountainboard decks are the part that most of the components are attached to, and provide the base for the rider to stand on. They are generally from 90–110 centimeters in length, and can be made from a range of construction methods and materials. For example, high specification boards may be made from composite carbon and glass-reinforced plastic, possibly with a wooden core, similar to a snowboard deck. Basic decks are generally made using laminated wood pressed into shape, comparable to a longboard deck with larger dimensions and a different shape. There are variable characteristics such as flex, weight, shape, length and tip angle that can be custom-made, or stock boards from a variety of manufacturers.

==== Trucks ====
Trucks are the components made up of a hanger, damping and/or spring system, and axles which attach the wheels to the deck. They also have the mechanisms required to allow the board to turn.

===== Skate trucks =====
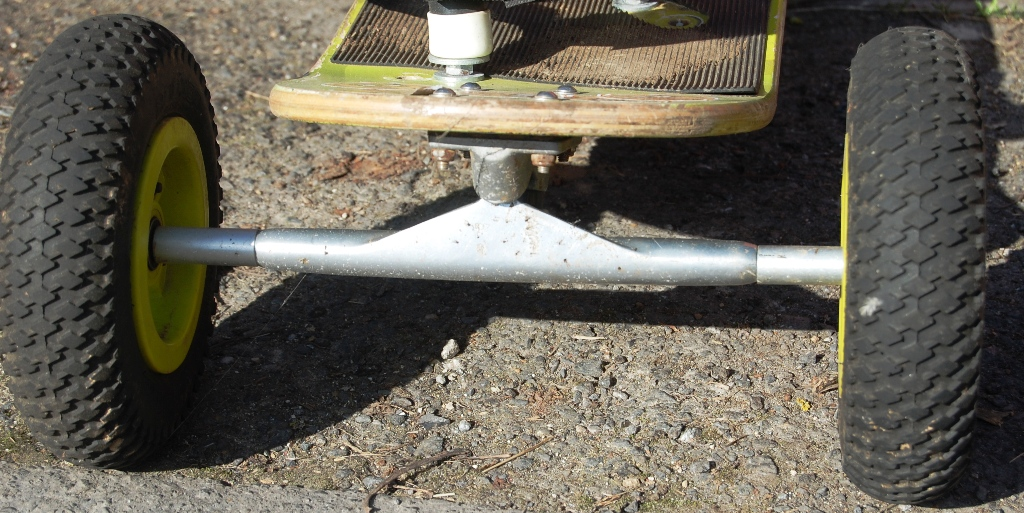
Skate truck

Skate trucks have a rigid axle and a top hanger, with a single bolt and bushings, also called rubbers or grommets, that provide the cushion mechanism for turning the mountainboard. The bushings cushion the truck when it turns. The stiffer the bushings, the more resistant the mountainboard is to turning. The softer the bushings, the easier it is to turn. A bolt called a kingpin holds these parts together and fits inside the bushings. Thus by tightening or loosening the kingpin nut, the trucks can be adjusted loosely for better turning and tighter for more control. Skate-style mountainboard trucks are similar to skateboard trucks but more robust and with a longer axle.

===== Channel trucks =====
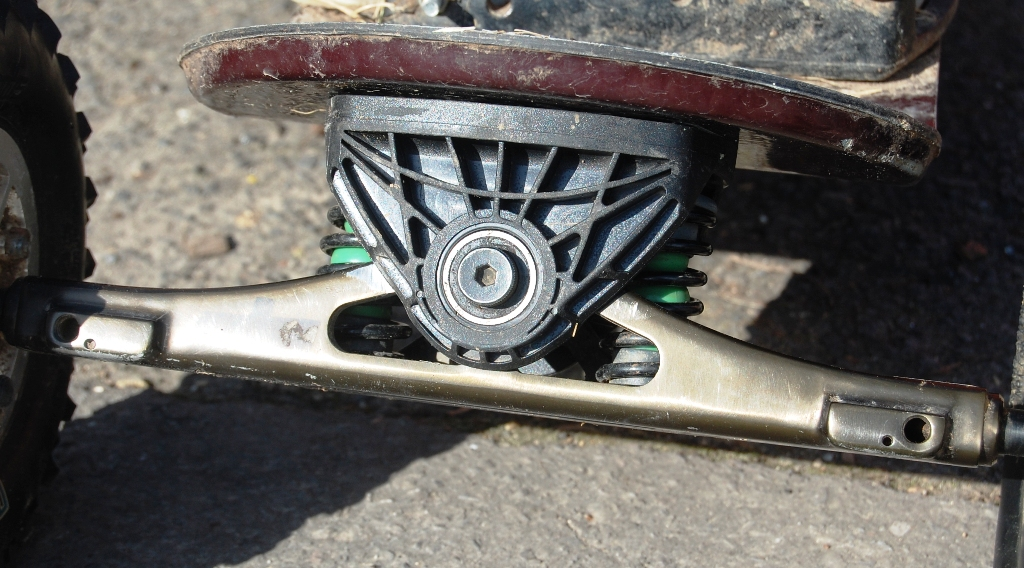
Channel truck

Channel trucks are common on mountainboards, and are made up of an axles mounted to the truck bottom piece, which is suspended from a top hanger by a kingpin. They are mounted to the deck using nuts and bolts through the hanger part, on an angle, (usually 35°). When the board is tilted laterally the axles turn together to angle the wheels in the direction of the turn. Two polyurethane dampers sometimes known as "egg shocks" are mounted between the hanger and the axle housing on each truck to provide resistance to the lean of the rider during turning. Springs are mounted in the same place with the dampers inside them.

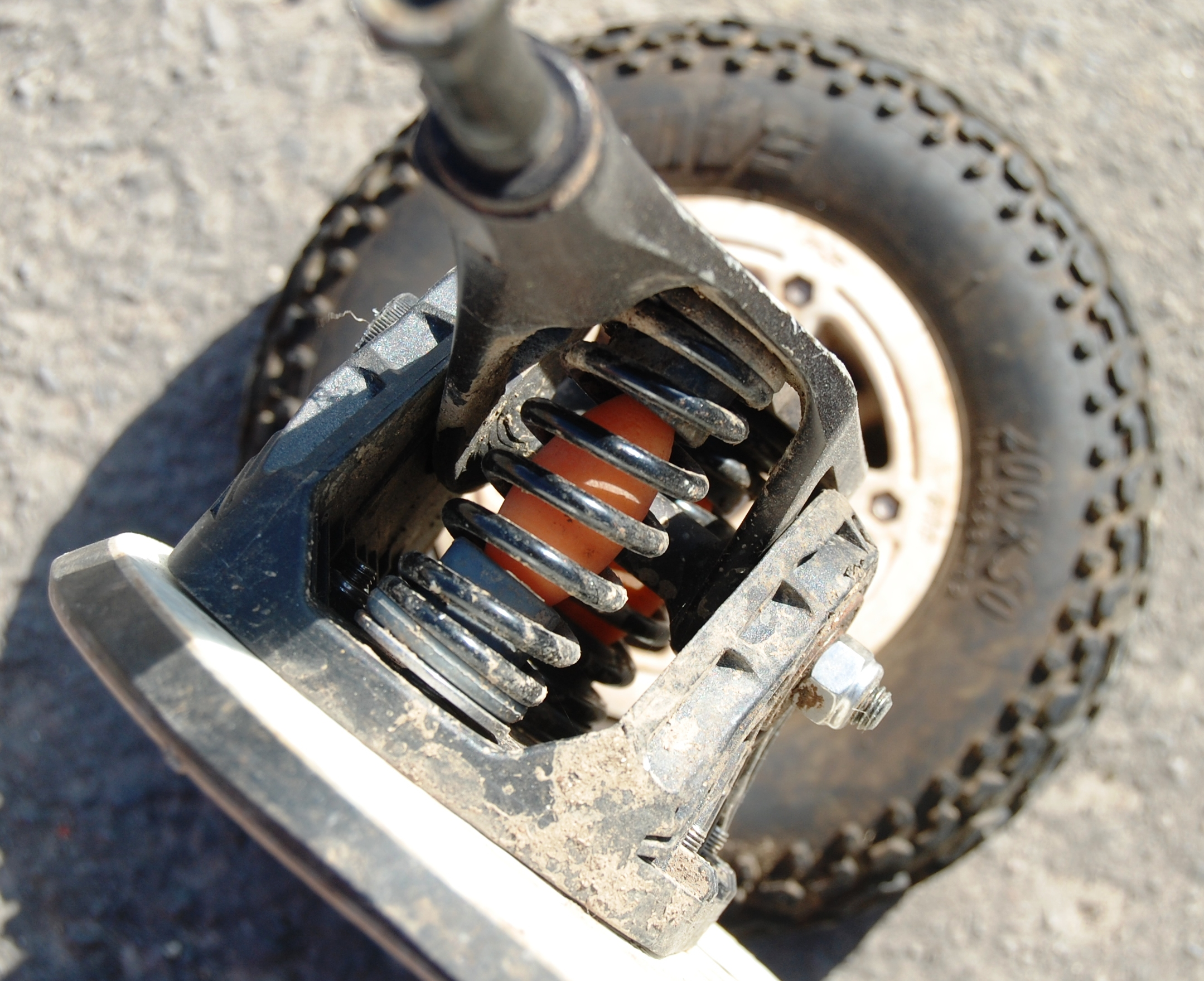
Shock and spring arrangement

The 'shocks' present in channel trucks are there to dampen the turning system, and help reduce the oscillations of the trucks on the board commonly described as speed wobble. The springs are there to return the deck to center after a turn has been performed. Neither are there to provide suspension between the deck and axles. They have a kingpin that can't move vertically which prevents this.

Also, the effectiveness of springs as employed in 2009 channel truck designs is open to debate. In a "Coil over Oil" shock, the extension of the spring is dampened as well as contraction. In a channel truck design, this is not the case as the damper sits freely inside the spring—therefore only contraction is dampened, not extension. This means that when a spring ceases to be under load and extends, it can extend past the equilibrium point.

===== NoSno trucks =====
NoSno trucks use two 'kingpin'-type bolts to create a floating pivot, an axle with a plate into which the bolts go, an angled base plate that attaches to the deck, and polyurethane bushings to dampen the turn. The amount of turn available in the trucks can be adjusted by tightening the bolts or by using bushings of different hardness. A similar design was adopted by Howla Mountainboards for the limited time that they manufactured boards.

==== Bindings ====
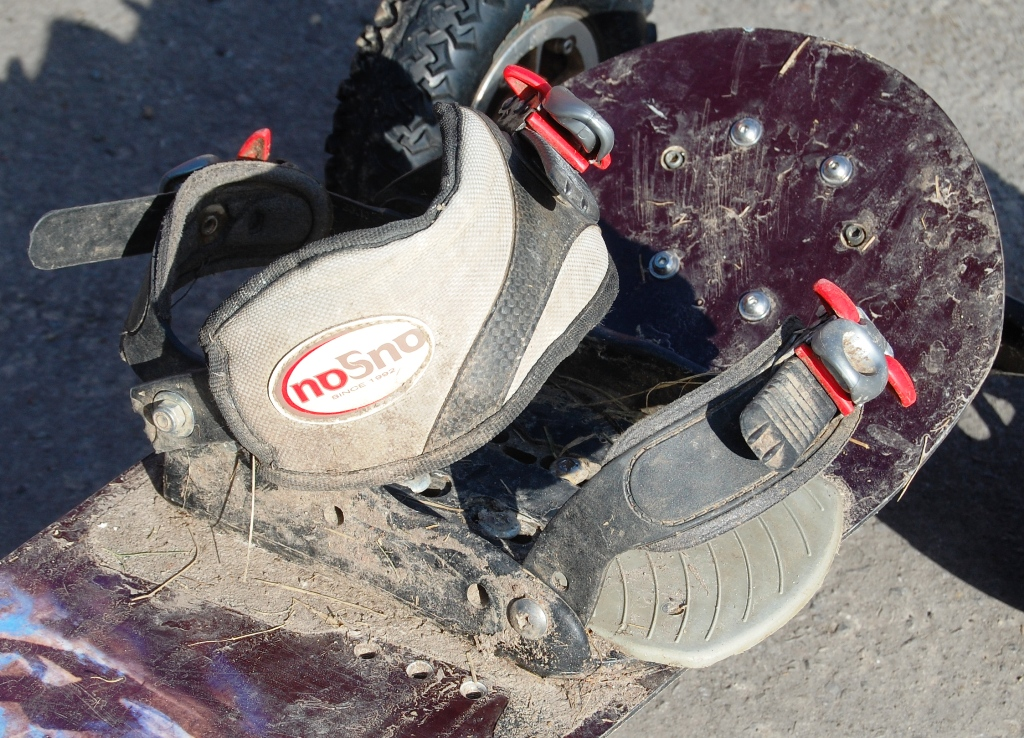
Snowboard binding

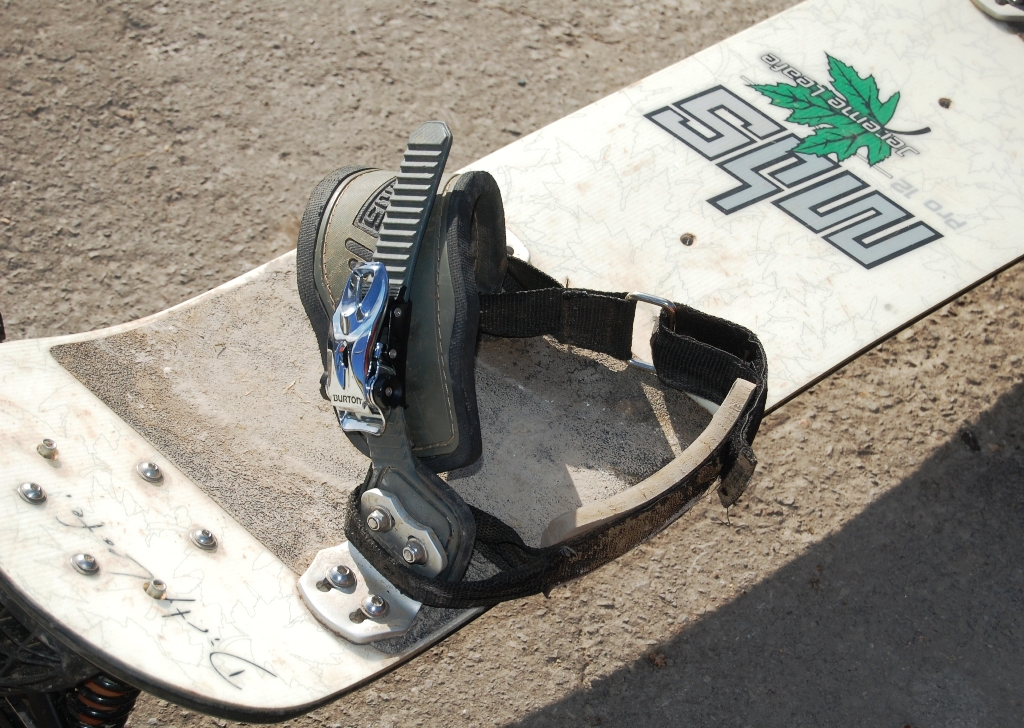
Ratchet-strap binding with heelstrap

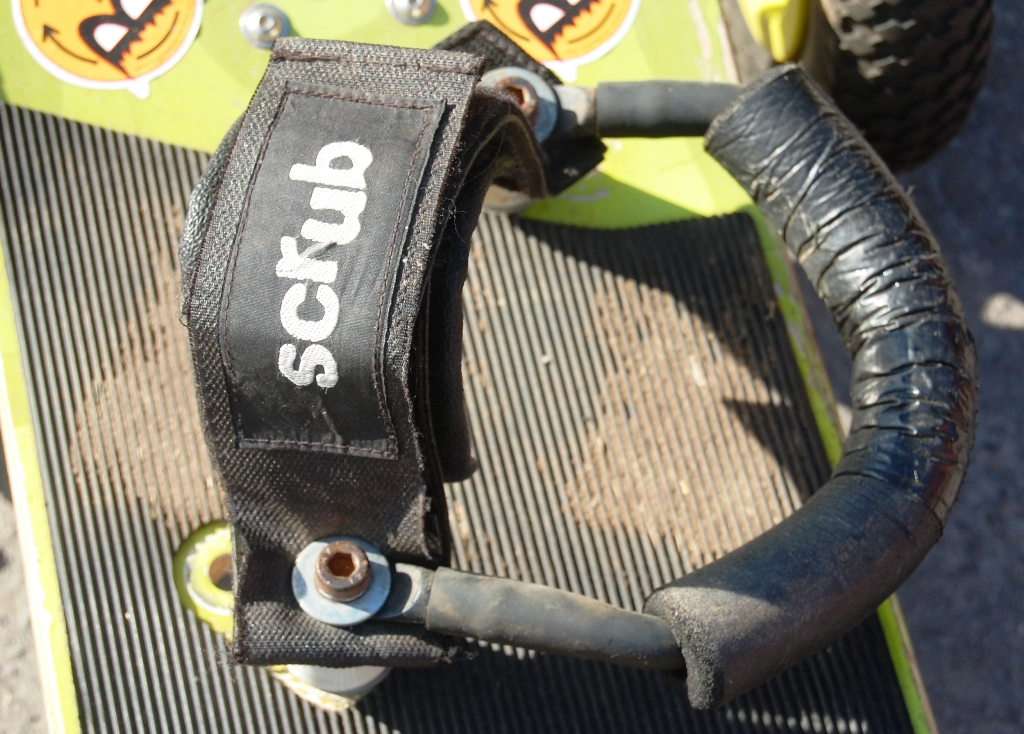
Velcro binding with heelstrap

Bindings involve adjustable straps that hold the rider on to the board while allowing room to move their feet.

- Snowboard bindings
- Ratchet-strap bindings
- Velcro Bindings
- Bar-Bindings
- Heelstraps

==== Wheels ====
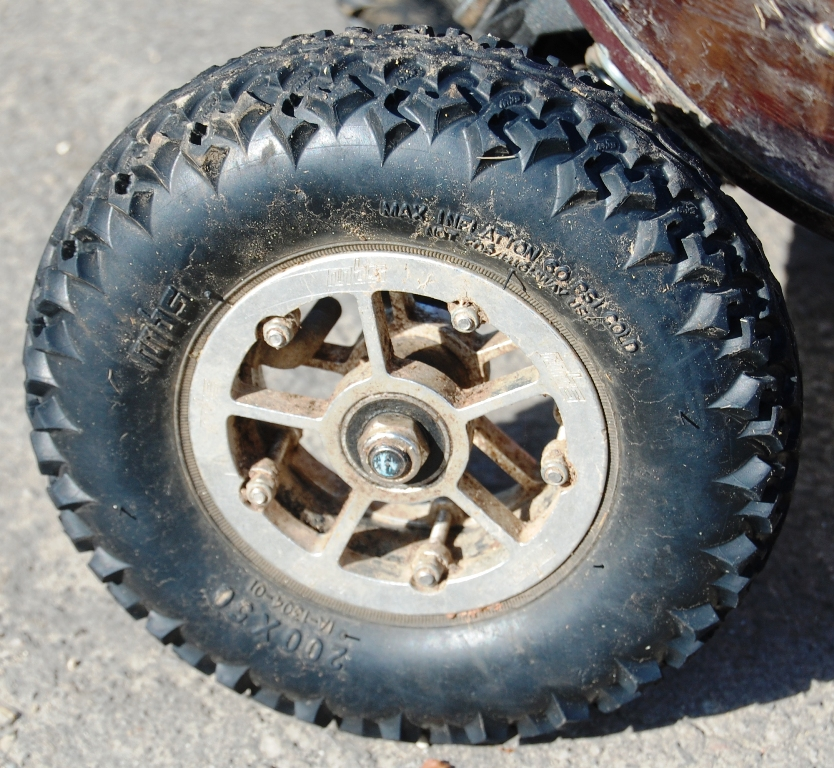
MBS wheel made up of an aluminium hub and 8" tire

Wheels are made up of plastic or metal hubs and pneumatic tires ranging in size of 8–13 inches. The 8" wheel has evolved into the best choice for freestyle riding, and also an all purpose wheel for general riding. Larger wheels (generally 9" and 10") are more useful to the downhill rider; granting the rider access to high-speed runs and more stability when traveling at speed. 13" or larger is better for floatation on soft sand or control in mud.

==== Tires ====
Various tires have been made available by different mountainboard manufacturers, giving riders a choice of tire specifications. For example, the thickness of the tire is variable and usually either 2- or 4-ply. 2-ply tires are lighter, but more susceptible to punctures than 4-ply tires. There is a variety of tread patterns available, ranging from street slicks to deep tread designed for maximum grip with split center beads to channel water away. Width and diameter are also variable.

==== Brakes ====
Brakes are generally reserved for big mountain riding where riders need an increased ability to control their speed over long runs. The brakes are usually attached to both front wheels of the mountainboard rather than the rear to give greater braking efficiency and reduce the chances of the rear wheels locking up and skidding. They are operated via a hand-held lever which when pulled causes both brake mechanisms to work simultaneously. There are four types of brakes used on mountainboards:

Mechanical Drum Brakes
Mechanical Drum Brakes use brake drums attached to the wheel with the 5 wheel-screws (Scrub). They are cheap and brake rigidly but get extremely hot and tend to melt the plastic hub. Good emergency brakes only, not any good for long steep hills. There is currently no heat resistant hub where they would attach to.

Hydraulic Disc Brakes
Hydraulic Disc Brakes use rotors attached to the hubs with hydraulically operated brake mechanisms that force ceramic pads against the rotors to effect braking. Advantages include high braking power and reliability. Disadvantages include cost, vulnerability of the discs, heat build up, and weight.

Hydraulic Rim Brakes
Hydraulic Rim Brakes use the hub, or preferably, a bolt on metal disc as the braking surface for hydraulically operated brake mechanisms that push polyurethane blocks against the braking surface. Advantages include good braking power, and good modulation. Disadvantages include possible damage to bearings.

Cable-pull 'V' Brakes
Cable-pull 'V' Brakes also use the hub or metal discs as a braking surface. The hand operated lever pulls a metal cable to push polyurethane blocks against the braking surface. Advantages include low cost, low weight, and easy installation and maintenance. Disadvantages include low braking power, and the need to be regularly adjusted.

=== Protections ===
Mountainboarders wear a range of protective equipment while riding.

- Helmets - are designed to protect the wearer's head from falls and damage to the brain. There are two types of helmets: full-face and open face. Full-face provides more protection to the wearer and open face provides greater visibility for the wearer.
- Wrist Guards - are designed to protect the wearers' wrists from impacts. They come in two types: gloves and wrap-arounds. But both include plastic splints which prevent the wearers wrists from bending backwards during a fall and protect the palms against cuts and grazes.
- Elbow Pads - are designed to protect the wearers' elbows from impact during falls. Sometimes forearm guards are incorporated into the elbow pads.
- Knee Pads - are designed to protect the wearers' knees from impact during falls.
- Padded Shorts - are designed to protect the wearers' hips, coccyx, and buttocks from impact during falls.
- Body Armor - is designed to protect the wearer's upper body, arms, shoulders and back from impact during falls.

== Disciplines ==
Mountainboarding consists of four main disciplines:

=== Downhill (DH) ===
Timed one-man descents. Usually relatively long courses (more than 1 kilometer) in the mountains. Sometimes referred to as big mountain.

=== Boardercross (BoarderX, BX) ===
Two to four-man racing on a specifically designed track.

=== Freestyle (FS) ===
- Slopestyle: Performing tricks on a slopestyle course consisting of multiple jumps, rails and innovative features.
- Big Air: Performing tricks including grabs, spins and inverts over jumps.
- Jibbing: Similar to Slopestyle except with the focus on smaller more technical features such as rails, quarter pipes, drops and smaller kickers.

=== Freeriding (FR) ===
Non-competitive riding over a range of natural terrain including woodland.

== Similar sports ==
Similar all terrain boardsports include dirtsurfing and kiteboarding.

=== Crossover sports ===
- Skateboarding
- Streetboarding
- Surfing
- Snowboarding
- Wakeboarding
- Mountain biking
- Sandboarding
- Dirtsurfing
- Grassboarding
- Kite landboarding

== Media ==
The following are some of the numerous publications Mountain Boarding has had in various news media outlets and other media, including for the annual Mountain Board US Open in Snowmass and the Twighlight Showdown Mountainboard Championships.

=== Historical magazines ===
- Off-Road Boarding Magazine founded in '99 with its editor Brian Bishop and other dedicated riders. It ran numerous pictorials, US riding spots, rider profiles and carried virtually no ads. It started small, and was given away at comps and shops. The last issue of the mag was printed in full color and a new name "Mountainboard Magazine". The new title was later adopted by a UK publisher.
- All Terrain Boarding Magazine aka ATBMag: The longest running, 4 years, and only Mountainboard magazine to make it onto mainstream newsagent shelves. Distributed worldwide it ran to 39 copies and one photo album featuring the work of Paul Taylor. ATBMag was also responsible for the creation of the World Freestyle Championships, running it for the first 2 years. It also created the World Series, taking place in 12 countries. ATBmag sponsored a team of riders, who were later sponsored by EXIT. The team featured Tom Kirkman, Laurie Kaye, Alex Downie, Oli Morrison, Arno Van Den Vejver, Ig Wilkinson, Jack Chew and Tuai Lovejoy. 2005 saw the team take to Europe and ride in 7 countries following the World Series Tour. In 2006 the magazine made its final issue.
- Scuz Mountainboarding Zine was first published in July 2004 as a paid-for magazine, however subsequent issues were published and distributed for free both as a printed hardcopy version and on the internet as a downloadable PDF. It was announced in October 2006 that issue twelve would be the final issue.
- Mountainboard Magazine was produced by the same people who created scuz, and it was re-branded to suit changing trends in mountainboarding, and a cover charge was introduced to help pay for the costs involved in producing the magazine as the advertising featured was sufficient. Only one issue was ever printed.
- Mountainboarding Video Magazine (MVM) The only video mag to showcase mountain boarding from around the world. This publication only made nine issues, co-produced and edited by Justin Rhodes, Van DeWitt, and Brett Dooley.
- UKATB ran for 6 years between 2000 and 2006 and was the first website to feature in-depth advice and tips from board maintenance to ramp building and trick tips. At its peak the site attracted over 10 000 unique visitors a month.

=== Social media ===
- @ukmountainboarding Created at the end of 2017 available on Instagram, Facebook, YouTube and TikTok. It started as a way to spread clips of UK riders and events to the world.

=== Movies ===
- Johnny Kapahala: Back on Board is the 70th Disney Channel Original Movie and is the sequel to the 1999 film Johnny Tsunami. Its popularity encouraged people to take interest in the extreme sport.

=== TV ===
- Mountainboard Aux Saisies TV coverage of the 2009 noSno World Downhill Championships, from the French TV channel Savoie ACTU.
- History Channel. The history of extreme sport on the History Channel. Featuring Mountainboarding and many other board sports.
- They Think It's All Over. Pete and Dave Tatham from noSno taking part in "Guess the sportsman" on BBC's sports comedy program "They think it's all over"
- Park City TV: What is Mountainboarding? The Utah DirtStar Army team on Park City TV in late 2005.
- Good Morning Utah. The DirtStar Army live on Good Morning Utah 2005.
- US Open Mountainboard Championships 2006, held in Snowmass, Colorado. JSP TV talks with the youth division winner and the director of the Dirt Dogs.
- Toasted TV. Interview with Munroboards team rider Ryan Slater on the Channel 10 show toasted TV.
- Domino's Pizza. "That was Puff" commercial featuring mountainboarders: Ryan Slater, Clint Farqhuar, Markus Lubitz, Adam Zemunic.
- Horizon TV. Willingen D-MAX World Series Mountainboard 2007.
- Rockon. TV report on WDR on the mountain board park opening in Winterberg.
- At Your Leisure: The DirtStar Army. TV report on Utah's DSA mountain board team ripping up the Park City dirt jumps.
- Top Gear. TV item showing a staged race between Tom Kirkman and a Mitsubishi Evo rally car and Bowler Wildcat.
- Friday Download. Kids TV report on mountain boarding (2012).

=== Newspapers and magazines ===
- The Guardian. What do snowboarders do when faced with the perennially powderless slopes of the UK? They find the nearest verdant hill and hurtle down it. Tim Moore and son go gung-ho in Surrey.
- The Telegraph. Jonny Beardsall loses balance and bottle as he faces a 40 mph slalom on a mountain board.
- Men's Health. Fancy traveling at speeds of 60 mph on a board down a mountain? Read on…

Chad Harding features in Stroud news and journal about his win in the under 14s UK championship freestyle.

== Public service / community (online) ==
- Atboarders. UK based mountainboarding badasses who reignite the hype. Always Fresh. Always A Ting
- The Dirt. US based mountainboard blog & news site.
- Surfing Dirt. International mountainboarders community forum.
- Remolition. Free mountainboard webzine with regular features.
- MountainboardingUK. Beginner mountainboard-riders website (free advice)

== Competitions ==
World Freestyle Championships

From 2005 to 2008 was named Fat Face Night Air WFC

From 2009 to 2010 was named Battle of Bugs

- 2004 (Weston Super X Arena, Weston Super Mare, UK) - Leon Robbins, USA
- 2005 (SWMBC, Bideford, UK) - Tom Kirkman, UK
- 2006 (SWMBC, Bideford, UK) - Alex Downie, UK
- 2007 (SWMBC, Bideford, UK) - Arno VDV, Belgium
- 2008 (Bugs Boarding, Gloucester, UK) - Renny Myles, UK
- 2009 (Bugs Boarding, Gloucester, UK) - Tom Kirkman, UK
- 2012 (Luzhniki, Moscow, Russia) - Matt Brind, UK
- 2017 (Venette, France) - Matt Brind, UK; Natasha Chernikova, RUS
- 2018 (Kranj, Slovenia) - Matt Brind, UK; Simona Petrò, ITA
- 2019 (Moszczenica, Poland) - Nicolas Geerse, NLD; Maja Bilik, POL
- 2023 (Venette, France) - Matt Brind, UK
- 2025 (Moszczenica, Poland) - Matt Brind, UK; Margaux Rolland, FRA
- 2026 (Sabie, South Africa) - Nicolas Geerse, NLD; Sarah Watson, UK

World Downhill Championships

- 2009 (Les Saisies, France) - Pete Tatham, UK
- 2010 (Bardonecchia, Italy) - Pete Tatham, UK
- 2011 (Bardonecchia, Italy) - Pete Tatham, UK
- 2012 (Les Saisies, France) - Jonathan Charles, UK
- 2023 (Super Besse, France) - Pete Tatham, UK; Margaux Rolland, FRA
- 2026 (Sabie, South Africa) - Amon Shaw, UK

World Boardercross Championships

- 2013 (Bukovac, Novi Sad, Serbia) - Kody Stewart USA; Martina Lippolis, ITA
- 2014 (Bukovac, Novi Sad, Serbia) - Matt Brind, UK; Martina Lippolis, ITA
- 2015 (Großerlach, Germany) - Matt Brind, UK; Simona Petro, ITA
- 2016 (Bukovac, Novi Sad, Serbia) - Matt Brind, UK; Sonya Nicolau, ROM
- 2017 (Venette, France) - Matt Brind, UK; Senka Bajić, SRB
- 2018 (Kranj, Slovenia) - Kody Stewart USA; Senka Bajić, SRB
- 2019 (Bukovac, Novi Sad, Serbia) - Matt Brind, UK; Vanja Rakovic, SRB
- 2023 (Venette, France) - Matt Brind, UK; Suzy Rolland, FRA
- 2026 (Sabie, South Africa) - Dawid Rząca, POL; Erica Leafe, USA

Overall World Champions

- 2017 (Venette, France) - Matt Brind, UK; Ola Tomalczyk, POL
- 2018 (Kranj, Slovenia) - Matt Brind, UK; Simona Petrò, ITA
- 2019 (Moszczenica, Poland; Bukovac, Novi Sad, Serbia) - Matt Brind, UK
- 2023 (Venette, France | Super Besse, France) - Matt Brind, UK; Margaux Rolland, FRA
- 2026 (Sabie, South Africa) - Dawid Rząca, POL; Sarah Watson, UK

European Downhill Championships

- 2009 (Bardonecchia, Italy) - Pete Tatham, UK
- 2010 (Bardonecchia, Italy) - Jonathan Charles, UK
- 2014 (Monte Penice, Italy) - Matt Brind, UK

European Mountainboard Tour

- 2010 - Arno VDV, Belgium
- 2014 - Matt Brind, UK

European Mountainboard Challenge

- 2010 (Bukovac, Novi Sad, Serbia) - Marcin Staszczyk, POL; Senka Bajić, SRB
- 2011 (Bukovac, Novi Sad, Serbia) - Marcin Staszczyk, POL; Senka Bajić, SRB
- 2012 (Bukovac, Novi Sad, Serbia) - James Wanklyn, UK; Sonya Nicolau, ROM
- 2015 (Kranj, Slovenia) - Dawid Rzaca, POL; Senka Bajić, SRB
- 2016 (Kranj, Slovenia) - Matteo Andreassi, ITA; Senka Bajić, SRB
- 2017 (Kranj, Slovenia) - Nicolas Geerse, NED; Senka Bajić, SRB

== See also ==
- Kiteboarding
