= OPAL Soil Centre =

English research centre

The OPAL Soil Centre is one of five centres of expertise under the Open Air Laboratories Network (OPAL). The OPAL Soil Centre is based at the Centre for Environmental Policy at Imperial College London. The OPAL Soil Centre has high-profile partners including the Environment Agency, British Geological Survey, and the Natural History Museum.

== Soil and Earthworm Survey ==
The OPAL Soil Centre developed the OPAL Soil and Earthworm Survey, a national public survey of the soil and earthworms in England. The survey was launched in March 2009 supported by a number of celebrities including Steve Leonard and Chris Packham. The survey asks members of the public to go out to their gardens, parks, playing fields or anywhere with soil and collect information about the habitat, soil and to count and identify any earthworms they find.

The results of the survey can be uploaded onto the OPAL website where participants can see their results appear on a map alongside other results. Results from the survey will be analysed by the OPAL Soil Centre to investigate the distribution of soils and earthworms across the England, and to investigate the effects that humans are having on soils.

The Soil and Earthworm Survey was featured on The One Show on 23 March 2009 with a piece presented by George McGavin. The centre is based at the Centre for Environmental Policy, Imperial College London, under the overall direction of Dr Nick Voulvoulis.

== Centre Aims ==
- Provide information, resources and training on soil quality and soil biodiversity at the community level.
- Coordinate a national survey to discover the degree of awareness and understanding of soil quality and ecosystems in England.
- Carry out research into pollution sources and their pathways in soil and the way that they affect soil systems.

== Scientific Objectives ==
The OPAL Soil Centre is coordinating an England-wide survey on soil and their earthworm populations.

The survey complements research the centre is carrying out into soils and soil quality. Research is focused on the interaction with pollution, other environmental media, and human and ecosystem health. The effects of anthropogenic activities including waste and land management practices to soils is an ongoing research theme.

== See also ==
- Soil science
- Environmental impact of agriculture
