= Freeboard (disambiguation) =

Freeboard may refer to:

- Freeboard (nautical), the height of a ship's deck above the water level
- Freeboard (skateboard), a six-wheeled skateboard designed to act like a snowboard on pavement
- Sea ice freeboard, the height of an ice floe above the water surface, used in measuring sea ice thickness
