= ISpot =

Web-based citizen science biodiversity project

iSpot

- Observation view on iSpot
- Website type: Citizen science
- Available in: English, Spanish
- Owner: Open University
- Website: www.ispotnature.org
- Commercial: No
- Registration: required
- Current status: Closed

iSpot was a website developed and hosted by the Open University with funding from the Open Air Laboratories (OPAL) network with an online community intended to connect nature enthusiasts of all levels.

Registered users upload images of wildlife observations, identify species, and discuss their findings with other members. This was intended to provide opportunities to learn more about the wildlife they have observed, and also provided a database of observations which is made available for scientific analysis.

The site also provided some online identification tools. In 2026, the Open University management decided it could no longer support iSpot, and iSpot was decommissioned on Thursday 11 June 2026.

== Purpose ==
The natural history observational skills required for accurate species identification in the field are neglected in formal education at all levels. iSpot is intended to help solve this problem by combining learning technology with crowdsourcing to connect beginners with experts.

== Communities ==
The communities as of 2015 include the original UK and Ireland, Southern Africa, Hong Kong, Chile (Spanish language) and Global, which covers everywhere else. These communities can link to their own taxonomic lists, or use the default Catalogue of Life list. In mid 2014 the global iSpot community exceeded 42000 registered participants.

== Function ==
In a 2015 study it was found that over 94% of observations submitted to iSpot are identified to some level, (>80% at species level), and that 92% of a representative sample of the identifications could be externally verified. Most observations were given an initial identification within an hour of posting. Identification is refined as other members review and agree with an existing identification, or propose an alternative. There is no time limit to this process.

=== Database ===
The number of observations uploaded with photographic records exceeds 500 000 as of May 2015.

Observations are classified taxonomically according to the standard chosen by the community. The taxonomic classification follows the standard principles for zoological and botanical classification, with some modifications to make it easier for the lay-person. One such modification is the allocation of taxa to groups.

The groups used on iSpot are:

- Amphibians and Reptiles
- Birds
- Fish
- Fungi and Lichens
- Invertebrates
- Mammals
- Other organisms
- Plants

Observations are geographically located in decimal degrees to any precision input by the contributor, and where applicable, the position is derived from the Exif of the lead photograph. The location details can also be input and edited manually. The location can be displayed on Google Maps. In some cases where the exact location must be hidden for conservation security, the map will display a rectangle surrounding the actual location. The location is then truncated to two decimal places, and this represents a corner of the rectangle.

=== On-site reputation ===
iSpot uses a unique reputation system to motivate and reward participants and as a tool to grade identifications of observations. Reputation points specific to one of the eight taxonomic groups used in the project are earned when an identification gets agreement from other participants, The value of the added points is proportional to the reputation for that group of the persons adding agreements. Exact values of reputation for the groups is not available to the users, but is displayed in the form of icons. Up to five icons may be displayed for any group, the first is awarded for a very small value, and the fifth for a rather large, but not publicly available value. Users with expert knowledge of taxonomy may be allocated an expert level reputation for the whole group in which their expertise is academically verifiable. For example, an expert on spiders would be considered an expert in all invertebrates. A similar but lesser reputation as "knowledgeable" can be allocated to users with informally acquired identification skills. The integration, if any, of earned reputation with allocated reputation is not publicly available.

This system is claimed to discriminate effectively between alternative identifications proposed for the same observation. The reputation system is shown to have improved the accuracy of the determination in 57% of cases studied. In the rest it either improved precision or revealed false precision.

The other form of reputation is proportional to the amount of contribution to the database in the form of observations and comments. These are accumulated as social points, and have no obvious value other than keeping score.

=== Projects ===
iSpot supports projects initiated by registered users and larger organisations, including at one time the South African National Biodiversity Institute (SANBI)

==== SANBI ====
The South African National Biodiversity Institute once chose iSpot as a platform for several citizen science national biodiversity projects. Originally iSpotZA was hosted independently of the main site, with a customised user interface, but at the end of 2014 it was integrated into the main site. Some functionality changed during the integration, but it has mostly been restored. SANBI has since migrated to iNaturalist.

===== SeaKeys =====
SeaKeys is the first large collaborative marine biodiversity project run by SANBI and funded by the Foundational Biodiversity Information Program of the National Research Foundation, which includes several citizen science projects on the iSpot website, such as:

- Sea Fish Atlas
- Sea Coral Atlas
- Sea Slug Atlas
- Crustacean Atlas

== Publications ==
=== About iSpot ===
- Silvertown, J; Harvey, M; Greenwood, R; Dodd, M; Rosewell, J; Rebelo, T; Ansine, J; McConway, K (2015). "Crowdsourcing the identification of organisms: A case-study of iSpot". ZooKeys (480): 125–146. doi:10.3897/zookeys.480.8803. PMC 4319112. PMID 25685027.

=== Using data from iSpot ===
- Bjørnstad, Anders; Grobbelaar, Elizabeth; Perissinotto, Renzo (2016). "Review of Afraustraloderes rassei Bouyer, 2012: description of its female and a new species of Pixodarus Fairmaire, 1887 (Coleoptera, Cerambycidae, Prioninae)". ZooKeys (558): 77–93. doi:10.3897/zookeys.558.6112. PMC 4768281. PMID 27006596.
- Carlson, Jane E.; Holsinger, Kent E. (2015). "Extrapolating from local ecological processes to genus-wide patterns in colour polymorphism in South African Protea". Proc. R. Soc. B. 282 (1806) 20150583. doi:10.1098/rspb.2015.0583. PMC 4426637. PMID 25876847.

== See also ==
- List of citizen science projects
- Participatory monitoring
- Reinventing Discovery: The New Era of Networked Science
- Open science
- Popular science
- iNaturalist
