= Seven Bumps =

Coordinates: 42.430°N 71.085°W

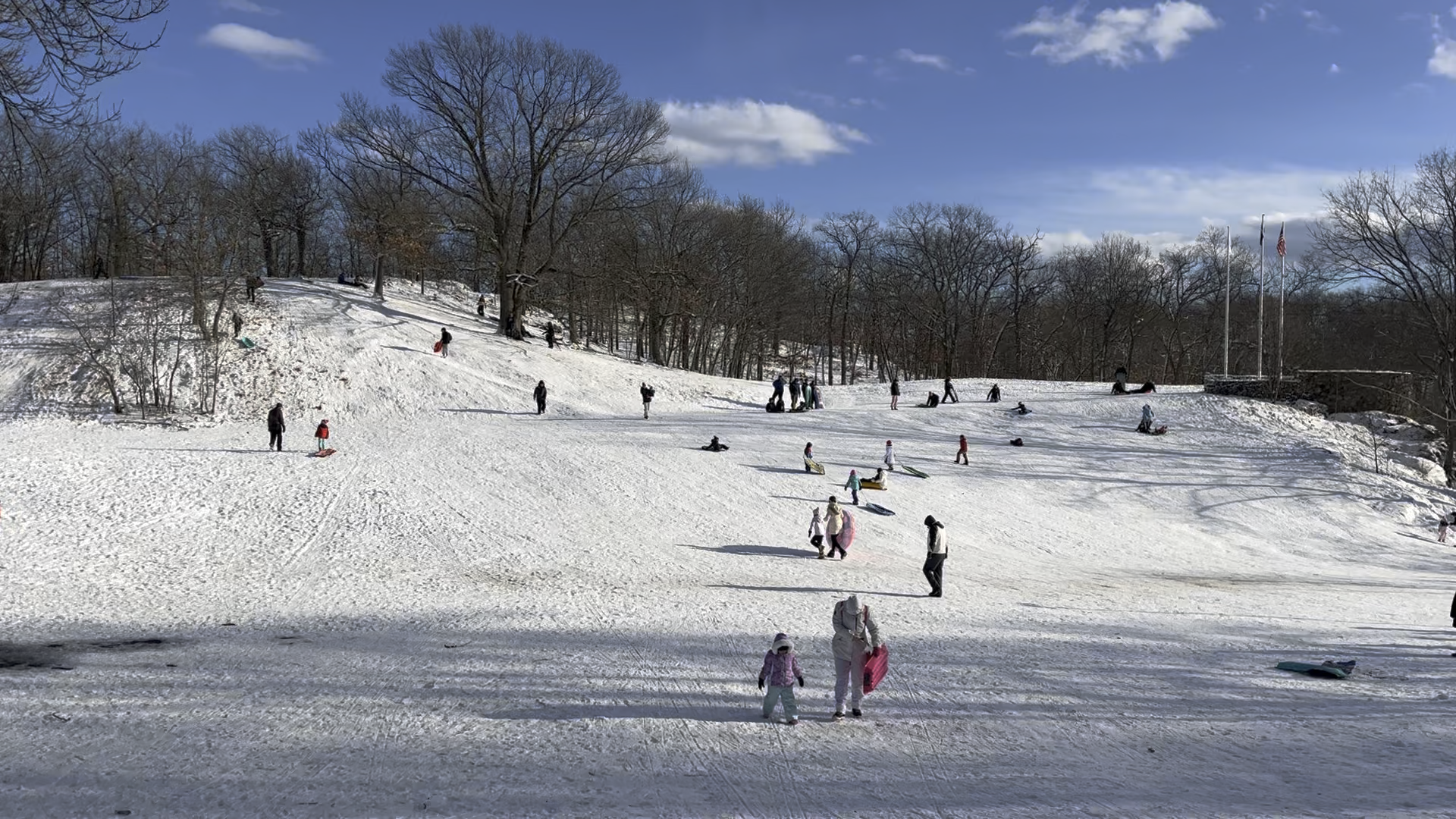
People sledding on Seven Bumps on a sunny day after a snowstorm.

Seven Bumps is a hill located in the West End section of Malden Massachusetts. It is located off Fellsway East, behind Fellsmere Pond. This hill has been used for decades in the wintertime for sledding and snowboarding.

It is believed that the sport of mountainboarding originated here. In the summer of 1978 an intrepid skateboarder, named Mike Motta, was challenged by an unidentified person to ride down Seven Bumps on his skateboard with the promise of receiving $1. Mike accepted the challenge and successfully navigated the hill for approximately half the distance. He was never paid. Recently, a minor controversy arose surrounding another location allegedly named "Seven Bumps". A college dormitory now stands where this alleged hill was supposed to be. No reliable resources could be located.
