= Siggerud =

Coordinates: 59°47′34″N 10°52′54″E

- Village
- Interactive map of Siggerud
- Country: Norway
- Region: Østlandet
- County: Akershus
- Time zone: UTC+01:00 (CET)
  - Summer (DST): UTC+02:00 (CEST)

Siggerud is a village in the municipality of Ski, Norway, just a few kilometres away from the border of the municipality of Oslo where most of Siggerud's population work. Its population (2005) is 1,353, but probably over 2000 if you count the area around.

Siggerud is a small place, but has recently hosted a number of celebrities, some of which are known outside Norway. The most famous is probably Lasse Kjus who won the alpine World Cup twice. Other celebrities from Siggerud include Christian Ingebrigtsen, who is in the boy band A1, Trude Mostue, well known in the UK as "Trude the Vet", TV host, actor and journalist, Christian Strand no:Christian Strand (adoptive son of political editor in the newspaper Dagsavisen, Arne Strand no:Arne Strand), Herman Flesvig no:Herman Flesvig, Fredric Aasbø en:Fredric Aasbø, plus various local celebrities, amongst other people including Christian's dad Stein Ingebrigtsen.
