= Dakuwaqa =

Deity in Fijian mythology

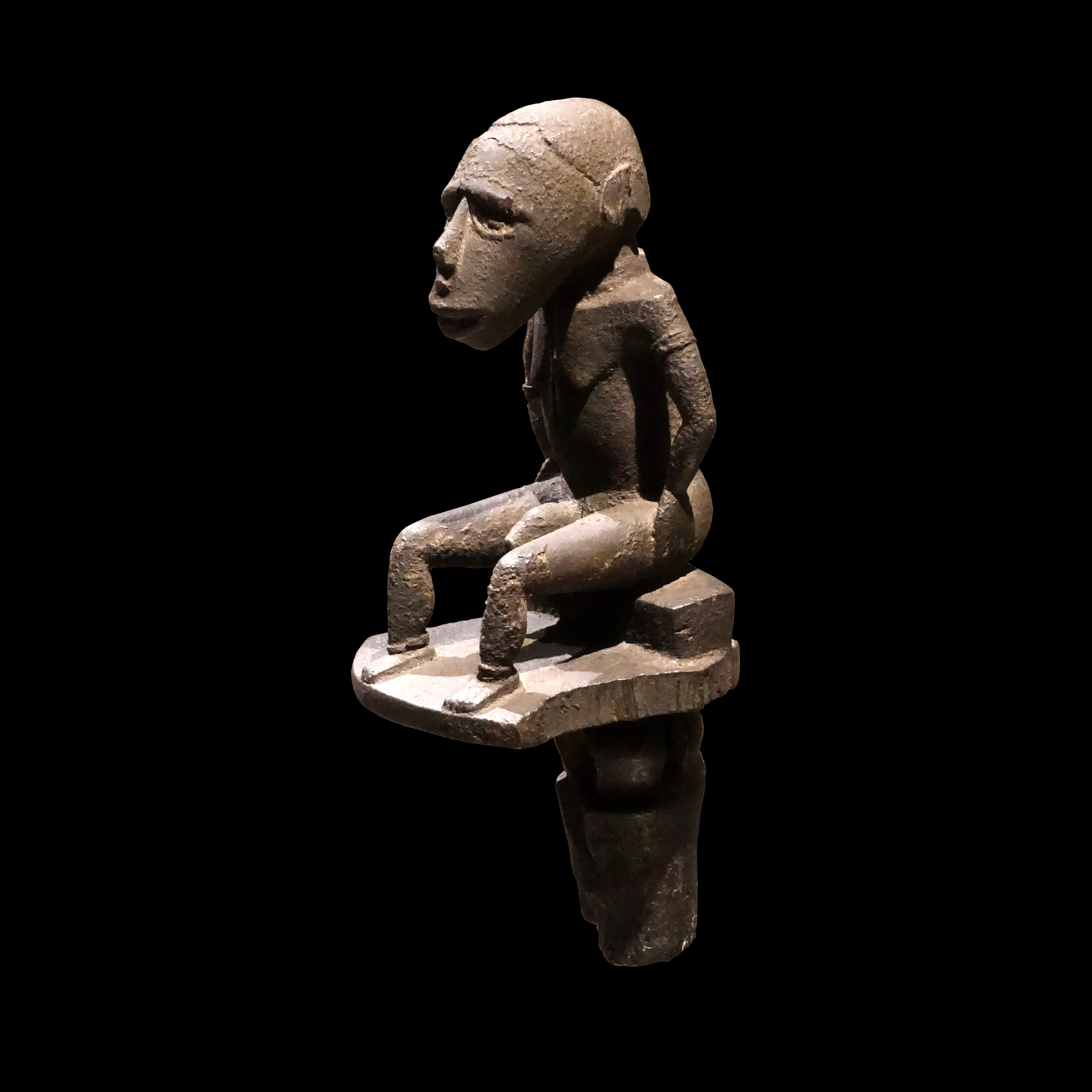
Wooden figure of Dakuwaqa from the Solomon Islands, on display at the Louvre gallery

In Fijian mythology, Dakuwaqa (Dakuwanga) is a shark deity and often appears as a fierce sea monster, guarding the islands. He was greatly respected by fishermen because he protected them from any danger at sea and its denizens.

== Background ==
In one creation myth, the god was planning inland to conquer Kadavu Island through the river when the goddess Rokobakaniceva challenged him in the form of an octopus. After a great battle, the octopus won by pulling out his teeth with her eight arms which enabled her to hold off the massive attack of Dakuwaqa, forcing Dakuwaqa to promise to never attack Kadavu again. That is how Dakuwaqa became the god and protector of Kadavu.

Dakuwaqa can also change shape into anything, but his real form is that of a muscular Fijian man with the upper torso of a shark. In the book Pacific Irishman, the Anglican priest Charles William Whonsbon-Aston records in Chapter 1, Creation:

When I came to Fiji the famed fish-god, the Dakuwaqa, was very much a reality. The Government ship, the Lady Escott, reached Levuka with signs of an encounter with the great fish, while the late Captain Robbie, a well known, tall, and very erect Scot, even to his nineties, told of the sleepy afternoon as his cutter was sailing from his tea estate at Wainunu, under a very light wind, with most of the crew dozing. A great fish, which he described as near 60 feet in length, brown-spotted and mottled on its back, with the head of a shark and the tail of a whale, came up under his ship, almost capsizing it.

The crew, instantly awake and concerned, followed the ancient pattern, pouring a strong libation of kava into the sea, which, it would seem, was just the right idea for placating fish-gods; the monster slowly submerged, the breeze gradually gathered the cutter away, its keel dragging along the monster's back, making the skin pale.

To the Fijian crew this was the "Dakuwaqa"--in the twentieth century; what must have been the effect in the tenth?

== Media ==
- Jeff VanderMeer wrote the story The Third Bear about Dakuwaqa.
- Dakuwaqa is the father of the supervillain King Shark in the DC Universe.
- One episode of the History Channel series Beast Legends is about Dakuwaqa.
- Dakuwanga is an Atlantean Bio-weapon in the Earth Prime setting of the Mutants & Masterminds roleplaying game.
- Dakuwanga is the official pet in the "Quidditch World Cup Argentina 2014" in the Harry Potter universe.
- Dakuwaqa's vest is a fictional artifact mentioned in the 2017 film Sharknado 5: Global Swarming as the item used to prevent sharknados in the past.
- The merged tribe in Survivor 45 was named after Dakuwaqa.

== See also ==
- Avatea
- Kamohoalii
- Ukupanipo
- Ulupoka
