= Beast Legends =

- Genre: Documentary; Reality; Paranormal; Mystery; Travel; Adventure; Outdoors
- Starring: Steve Leonard; Francis Manapul; Kathryn Denning; Scott Edwards
- Narrated by: Peter Outerbridge
- Country of origin: United States
- Original language: English
- No. of seasons: 1
- No. of episodes: 6

Production
- Executive producers: Pauline Duffy; Elliott Halpern
- Running time: 45 minutes
- Production company: Yap Films

Original release
- Network: History Channel; Syfy
- Release: September 9 – October 14, 2010

Beast Legends is a science fiction television miniseries produced by a Toronto and Leeds based independent film company called Yap Films, Inc. It was first shown on the Canadian History Channel in the summer of 2010 and was later aired on the US SyFy Channel, starting on September 9, 2010 and ending on October 14, 2010. The show followed a team of creative researchers and artists who explored the globe following stories of legendary and mythological beasts. As they investigate the history behind these tales, they study the ecology and biology of similar real-life creatures that may have inspired the stories, and conclude by bringing the beasts to life with computer generated effects and animation.

== Cast ==
- Steve Leonard – Adventurer/Veterinary Surgeon
- Francis Manapul – Comic Book Artist
- Kathryn Denning – Myth Expert/Anthropologist/Archeologist
- Scott V. Edwards – Organismic and Evolutionary Biologist

Other

- Mike Paixao – Computer Animator

== Reception ==
The premiere episode on the Syfy channel generated mixed reviews. Common Sense Media says "Beast Legends is an entertaining blend of science and fantasy. By grounding their research in history, zoology, and natural science, the team provides a very believable launching pad for the evolution of a legend. Not only does it make their own fictional CGI creation seem possible, it also shines a light on the ancient cultures that spawned the original myths."

DreadCentral.com says; "If the cancellation of "MonsterQuest" has left you jonesing for a new monster-hunting show, then Syfy's "Beast Legends" ... might fill the void and give you the cryptozoologists finding nothing or inconclusive evidence fix that you're still craving."

== Episodes ==
No.	Title	Original release date
1	"The Kraken"	September 9, 2010
The team researches the legends of the Kraken and envisions a 200-foot-long (61 m) cephalopod with the characteristics of both squid and octopus that preys on whales and can tear an oak-hulled sailing ship to pieces.
2	"Fire Dragon"	September 16, 2010
The team heads to the forests of Poland to track down the origins of a fire-breathing dragon called Smok, and recreate how the monster might appear to terrified medieval villagers.
3	"Megajaws"	September 23, 2010
The researchers go to the island of Fiji to investigate the stories of Dakuwaqa – a shape-shifting shark-god.
4	"Winged Lion"	September 30, 2010
The investigators head to Mongolia's Altai Mountains following the legends of the Griffin – a beast with razor-sharp talons, the head and wings of an eagle and the body of a lion.
5	"Wildman of Vietnam"	October 7, 2010
The team treks into the jungles of Vietnam following the stories of a primal wild man that appears to be similar to the legendary Sasquatch of North America.
6	"Bird Monster"	October 14, 2010
The beast hunters go to the Navaho lands of New Mexico on the hunt for a massive, legendary bird that folklore describes to be the size of small airplane.
