= Steve Leonard =

British television personality and veterinarian

Stephen Leonard
- Born: 4 September 1972 (age 53); Enniskillen, County Fermanagh, Northern Ireland
- Occupations: Veterinarian, Wildlife presenter
- Height: 6 ft 2 in (1.88 m)

Stephen Leonard (born 4 September 1972 in Enniskillen, County Fermanagh, Northern Ireland) is a Northern Irish veterinarian and television personality.

== Early life ==
Leonard's family moved to Cheshire from Northern Ireland when he was six weeks old. He was educated at The King's School, Chester.

== Career ==
Steve Leonard studied veterinary science at Bristol University Veterinary School. In the final year of his degree, the BBC approached the college to film a group of final-year students. Originally seeing the idea of appearing on TV as "a bit of a laugh," he agreed to participate in the filming. The series, Vets' School (1996), was a huge success, and was swiftly followed by Vets in Practice. He went on to present Vets in the Wild (2000–02) with Trude Mostue.

He quit full-time veterinary employment and found himself travelling all over the world with the BBC Natural History Unit, filming for Ultimate Killers. He travelled to places as far away as Indonesia and India.

Steve and his elder brother Tom Leonard are currently working at the Leonard Brothers Veterinary Centre in Whitchurch, Shropshire, and Crewe, Cheshire. During the programme Return to... Vets in Practice, shown in July 2008, Steve explained that he had decided to return to being a vet full-time, and to fit his filming commitments around his veterinary career. He has recently returned from Borneo where he filmed a second series of Orangutan Diary with co-presenter Michaela Strachan.

In March 2009, Steve helped launch the Open Air Laboratories (OPAL) network soil and earthworm survey, a scheme that aimed to get the public more involved in science and nature.

== Filmography ==
- "Big Week at the Zoo" (2018)
- "Trust me, I'm a Vet" (2017)
- Panda Babies (2015)
- Nature's Newborns (2013)
- Safari Vet School (2012)
- Animal Kingdom (2011)
- Beast Legends (2010)
- The Hottest Place on Earth (2009)
- Orangutan Diary (2007–09)
- Return to... Vets in Practice (2008)
- Sharks: Great Whites in Great Britain? (2006)
- Incredible Animal Journeys (2006)
- Journey of Life (2005)
- Animal Camera (2004)
- Steve Leonard's Search for the Loch Ness Monster (2003)
- Steve Leonard's Extreme Animals (2002)
- Steve Leonard's Ultimate Killers (2001–02)
- Vets in the Wild (2000–02)
- Holiday (1997)
- Vets in Practice (1996–2000)
- Vets' School (1996)
