= Vets in Practice =

- Starring: Trude Mostue; Steve Leonard; Joe Inglis; Emma Milne
- Narrated by: Christopher Timothy
- Theme music composer: Debbie Wiseman
- Country of origin: United Kingdom
- Original language: English
- No. of series: 11
- No. of episodes: 110 (+ 4 specials)

Production
- Running time: 30 minutes
- Production company: BBC

Original release
- Network: BBC One
- Release: 26 August 1997 – 31 December 2002

Related
- Vets' School (1996); Vets in the Wild (2000–02)

Vets in Practice is a BBC fly-on-the-wall documentary series that followed a group of trainee veterinary surgeons. The first episode, Animal Magic, aired at 8 pm on 26 August 1997. Series one attracted 8.09 million viewers (39 per cent audience share). It made celebrities of Trude Mostue and Steve Leonard, who became television personalities.

Filming took place at various locations in England and Wales, including Longleat Safari Park, as well as veterinary practices in Kenya, Botswana, Turkey, and the Bahamas.

In 1999, it won Most Popular Documentary Series at the National Television Awards.

== Series overview ==
#	Episodes	Aired
1	10	26 August – 10 October 1997
2	10	5 February – 6 March 1998
3	10	21 July – 18 August 1998
4	10	7 January – 5 February 1999
5	10	27 July – 9 September 1999
6	10	1 February – 1 March 2000
7	10	14 August – 14 September 2000
8	10	5 January – 4 February 2001
9	10	29 August – 28 September 2001
10	10	3 January – 7 March 2002
11	10	29 August – 27 September 2002

=== Specials ===
Title	Synopsis	Date
Vets in Practice at Christmas	Christmas special.	26 December 1999
Vets in Practice at Christmas	Trude visits her family in Norway.	21 December 2000
Vets in Practice at Christmas	Christmas special.	20 December 2001
Goodbye Vets in Practice	Vets reminisce about their time on the show.	31 December 2002

== Return to... Vets in Practice ==
In July 2008, BBC Two broadcast a five-part series called Return to... Vets in Practice, catching up with the stars of Vets in Practice, and highlights from the original series.
