= Fellsmere Park Parkways =

Park in Malden, Massachusetts

- Fellsmere Park Parkways, Metropolitan Park System of Greater Boston
- U.S. National Register of Historic Places
- U.S. Historic district
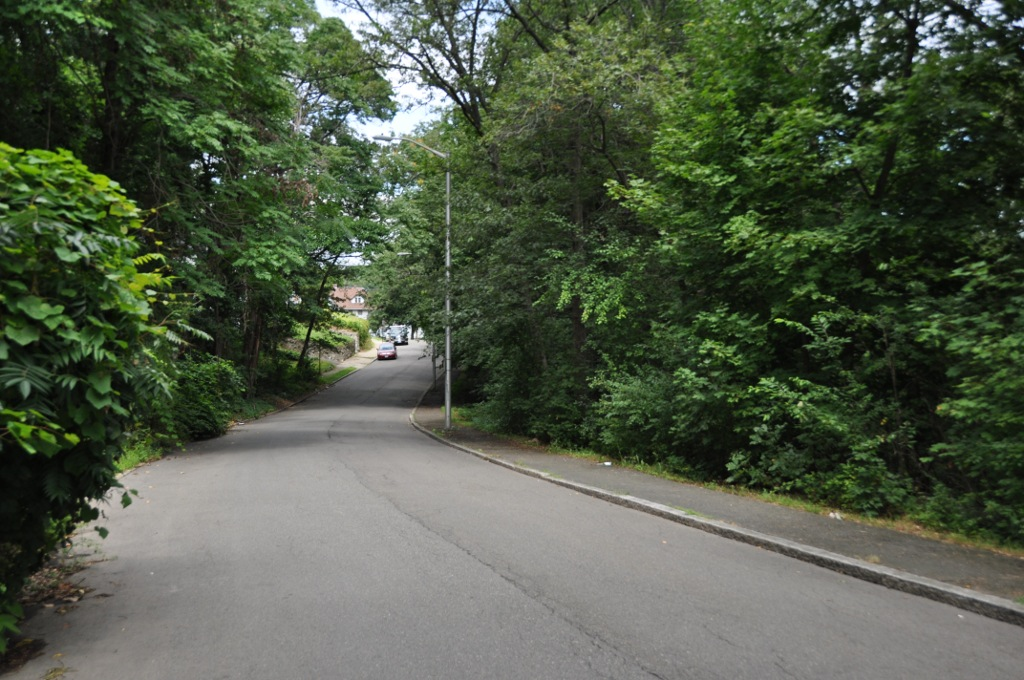
- West Border Road

- Location within Massachusetts Location within the United States
- Location: Malden, Massachusetts
- Coordinates: 42°25′41.1″N 71°5′11.9″W
- Area: 2 acres (0.81 ha)
- Built: 1913
- Architect: Eliot, Charles; Olmsted Brothers, et al.
- MPS: Metropolitan Park System of Greater Boston MPS
- NRHP reference No.: 03000381
- Added to NRHP: May 9, 2003

Fellsmere Park is a historic park that was designed by the famous landscape architect Frederick Law Olmsted for the city of Malden, Massachusetts. The construction began in 1893 and was finished in 1899. Most of the land for the park was donated by Malden's first mayor Elisha S. Converse. After the fire on his rubber shoe factory in 1875, he purchased the swamp planning to turn it into a water reservoir in case of emergency. Later, following the advice of the noted journalist Sylvester Baxter, he donated the land for establishing a beautiful public park with a pond. In 1905 the city turned the park over to the Metropolitan Parks Commission (MPC, predecessor to the Metropolitan District Commission and today's Massachusetts Department of Conservation and Recreation (DCR)). The MPC in 1913 designed the boundary roads of the park (West Border Road and Boundary Road), which were listed on the National Register of Historic Places in May 2003 as Fellsmere Park Parkways. Fellsway East, which is part of the Fellsway Connector Parkways, runs through Fellsmere Park on the east side of Fellsmere Pond.

During the winter, sledding is popular on a hill called Seven Bumps.

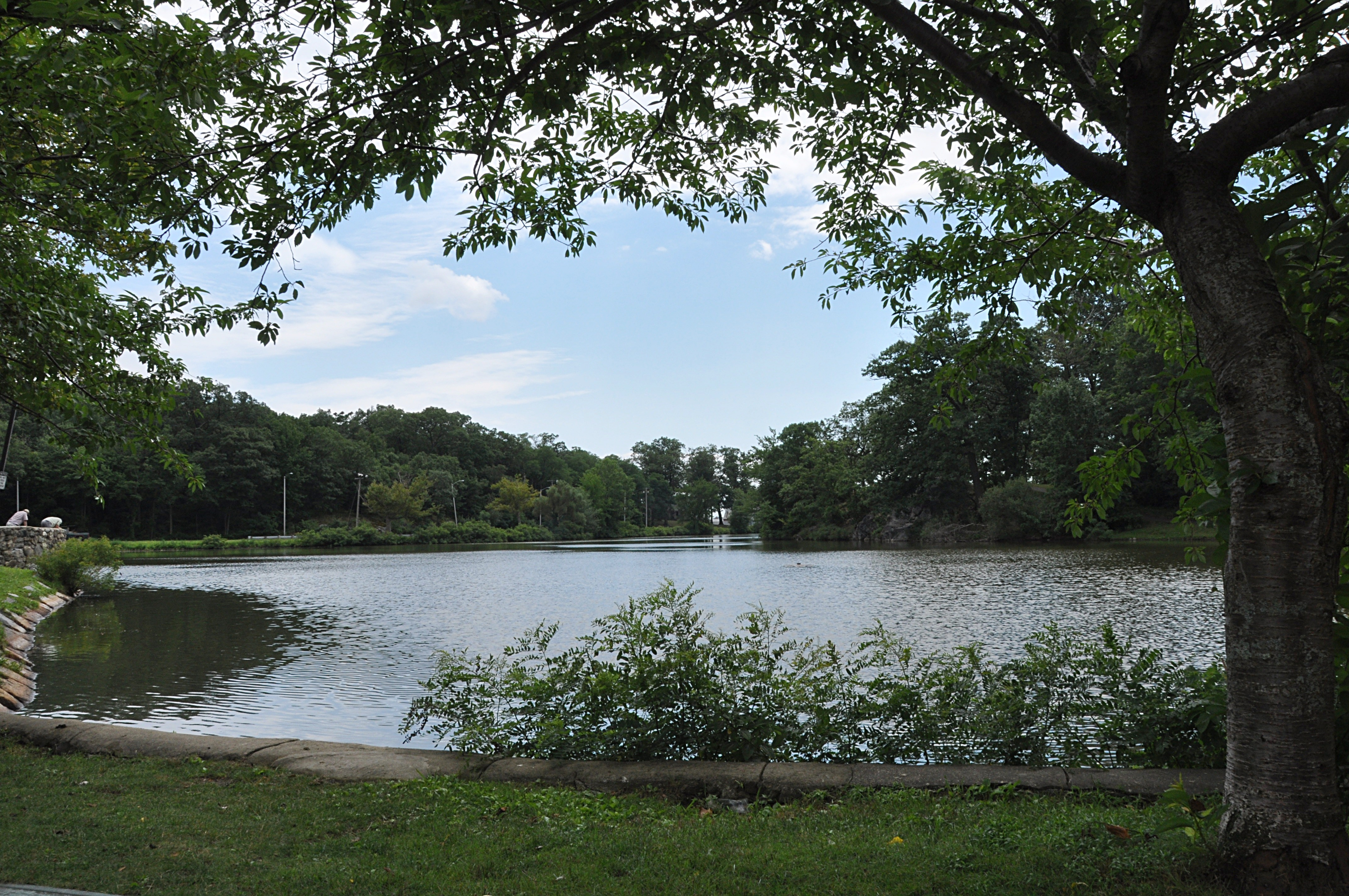
Fellsmere Pond

== See also ==
- National Register of Historic Places listings in Middlesex County, Massachusetts
