= Dirtsurfing =

Australian boardsport

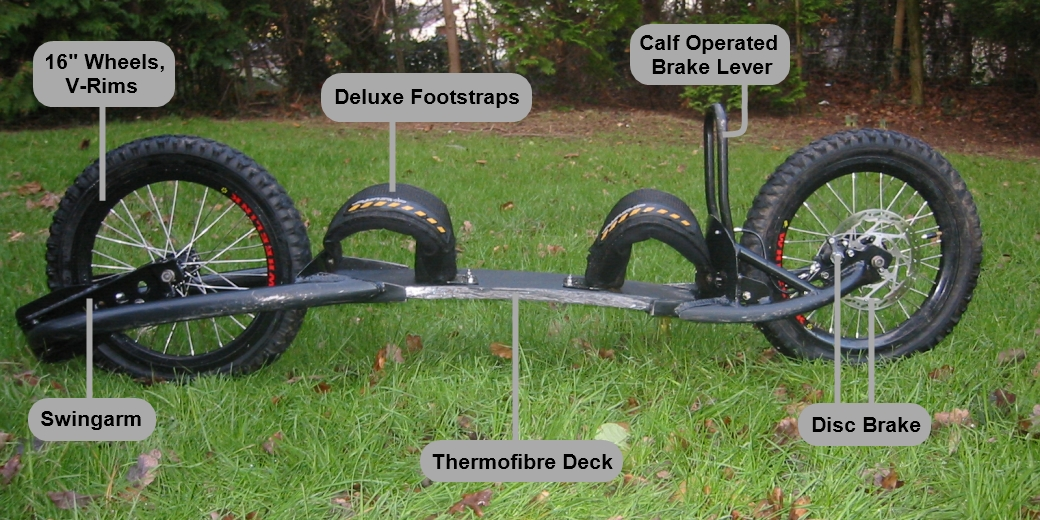
Dirtsurfer with the main parts labelled.

Dirtsurfing is the sport of riding a Dirtsurfer brand inline board. This new Australian boardsport is correctly known as inline boarding because Dirtsurfer is a trademark protected brand name.

A Dirtsurfer is composed of an aircraft aluminium tube frame, a laminate or composite deck and two 20in or 16in diameter BMX style bicycle wheels. Footstraps are (optionally) attached to the deck to give more control to the rider. The board is unique in that it incorporates a patented steering geometry where the front wheel pivots from a point in front of and below the axle of the wheel, via the 'Swingarm'. The rider's weight automatically centres and straightens the front wheel, creating stability and control. Another feature of the Dirtsurfer which is not found on four-wheeled boards is that, much like a bicycle, the stability actually increases with speed.

Inline Boarding was made an official race class by the International Gravity Sports Association (IGSA) and Gravity Sports International (GSI) in 2005. The 2005 IGSA World Cup Champion inline boarder is Nihat Uysal of Germany. Nihat rides the Silver GP-X (see below)

== Models ==
The first board was designated the GP (general purpose) and was available in black, red and blue colour options. Initially it was sold without brakes, which were later made standard as an addition to the existing frame, and utilised a retro fit "calf lever" operating system. A Limited Edition model was made of the GP, which offered a silver anodized frame, V rim wheels and a signed certificate and number.

The next board made available was the GP-X, which came with a silver anodized aluminium frame, blue anodized deep V rims, fully integrated calf brake with moulded plastic lever, increased ground clearance, disc brake caliper lugs on the frame, and disc hub on the rear wheel for easy conversion to disc brake use.

Two alternative versions to the GP-X were produced. The first, called the Road Racer, used the same frame as the GP-X in canary yellow powder coat finish, with black V rims and slick tyres. The other was a UK specific beach racer model, with sealed bearing hubs, Black V rims, disc brake as standard, and beach tread tyres.

In 2003, Dirtsurfer introduced the Flexideck, a newer concept with an epoxy/fibreglass/maple composite deck connecting the front and rear frame to absorb jumps. Made available in powder coated lime green frame with purple anodized V rims, and disc brake as standard, it offered greatly increased ground clearance and a reinforced frame for jumping.

Dirtsurfer has updated their line-up with two new models for 2006: The Flexi Pro Downhill (DH), an updated Flexideck; and the all new Freestyle board (FS), a scaled down Flexideck with 16 inch wheels. Both models feature the new adjustable metal calf brake lever, rear disc brake, and new thermofibre deck. In addition to updating their flexideck boards, dirtsurfer also updated their line of General Purpose models (GP). Both are manufactured from HT steel. The new 16" GP comes in white, with the new braking lever and disk brakes. The new GP 20" come in black and also has the new braking handle and disk brakes.

== Movement ==
A unique feature of the Dirtsurfer is that it emulates the feel of carving as on a snowboard. This is achieved by the front wheel being mounted to a single pivoting point, allowing the axle of the wheel to be above the board. Think of the idea as being very similar to riding a bike that does not have handlebars and cannot independently create speed. A Dirtsurfer comes with a leg operated brake, either as a disc or a V-Brake as used on many bicycles.

The Dirtsurfer will never experience a speed wobble normally associated with other bikes or board sports.

== Propulsion ==
The Dirtsurfer can be used as a downhill sport on or off-road, using just the power of gravity. The Dirtsurfer may also be "skated" in flat areas. "Skating" the Dirtsurfer means to push yourself forward with one foot while standing on the Dirtsurfer with the other foot the way you would a skateboard. Many Dirtsurfer riders also use a kite, sail or a kitewing, sometimes called wingsurfing to propel the Dirtsurfer in flat areas with adequate wind.

== Disciplines ==
=== Downhill ===
This discipline is similar to mountain biking, where the Dirtsurfer is ridden off-road down varying grades of tracks, from forest roads to technical singletrack.

=== Road Riding ===
Many Dirtsurfer riders enjoy the fluid feel of carving down long asphalt roads, usually found in mountainous areas. High speeds at over 70 mph have been achieved, with riders limited only by turns in the road and their own sanity (and, to a lesser extent, speed limits). Boards are often modified with slick tyres for this purpose. Riders are often found wearing motorcycle leathers and full face helmets to try to prevent road rash in the event of an accident. An international race circuit has been growing since 2001 with major events held annually in Canada, the US, Switzerland, Sweden, Germany and Austria.

=== Kiting ===
Dirtsurfing with a kite or kitewing is called wingsurfing and is performed on flat open spaces such as beaches or fields. Utilizing the wind, riders can achieve incredible air time and perform tricks that would otherwise require a massive ramp. It is even possible to ride uphill with sufficient wind. Unlike powerkiting with a mountain board, the Dirtsurfer is unidirectional; that is, it only goes one direction. However, it is possible, using the power of a kite or kitewing, to tack and gybe, much like a boat or windsurfer to change direction. Unlike a windsurfer however, it is not practical to change sides when coming to the end of a run in one direction. To overcome this, most riders can make the transition from "heel-side" to "toe-side". Riding toe-side means that your toes not your heels, point towards the floor as you lean forward into the wind, with your kitewing or kite behind you. This is not as difficult as it sounds. Due to the gyroscopic stability of the Dirtsurfer, speed is limited only by the wind, with recorded speeds well over 40 mph on a flat surface.

== Equipment ==
- Dirtsurfer
- Footstraps: Vital for achieving a strong rider/board interface.
- Helmet: An extremely valuable piece of safety equipment. Many riders prefer the safety of a full face Helmet, and others like the comfort of a skate style lid. The choice is personal and often dependent on the rider's preferred riding style.
- Pads: Knee and elbow pads are the most widely used. They help to prevent injury in case of a fall. Wrist guards are also recommended.
- Footwear: A strong pair of shoes or boots. Skate style shoes are the favourite among dirtsurfer riders as they offer comfort, strength, and padding.
