= Kitewing =

Wing-shaped sail

A Kitewing is a wing-shaped sail designed to use wind power to provide speed and lift to riders in outdoor environments. It can be used on a number of different surfaces when paired with the appropriate vehicle, including skis, snowboards, ice skates, and roller skates.

== Description ==
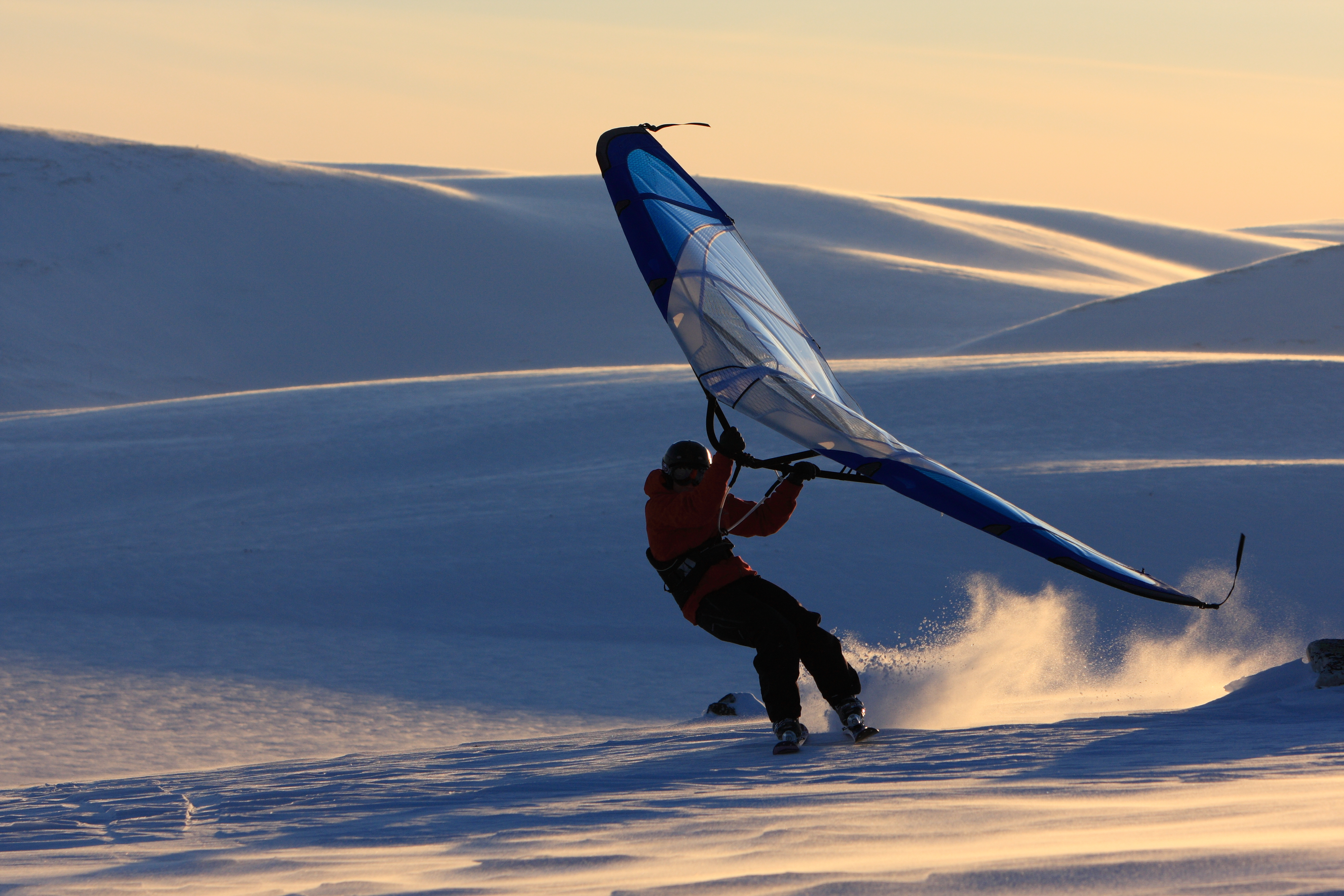
Kitewing in Lapland, photo taken by Patrick Blom

A Kitewing differs from a sports kite or traction kite in that a Kitewing does not have a separate control system (see kite control systems). Instead, a Kitewing is held directly in the hands of the user, which provides control, stability and depower. In addition, a Kitewing does not have lines to tangle, and can be manoeuvred easily to perform a wide variety of tricks, turns and fast speeds.

A Kitewing can be used in varied wind ranges. For initial learning only a small space and low wind speeds are required to allow riders to familiarise themselves with the Kitewing assembly and handling characteristics.

In the correct wind conditions an experienced rider can reach speeds up to 90 km/hour. Some very experienced riders have performed controlled jumps of several hundred meters (on declining terrain) or perform jump turns and other advanced manoeuvres.

== Types and sizes ==
A small Kitewing can provide improved manoeuvrability and increased speed in strong wind conditions. It is also better suited to learning. A larger version is preferable for use on sand, grass or other surfaces with high friction.

== Safety ==
A Kitewing rider can sustain injuries from a fall so the appropriate safety gear should be worn depending on the terrain. It is important to remember that a Kitewing should always be used with caution, in clear safe areas, and with the proper safety equipment. Typical safety equipment are helmets and safety leash especially designed for Kitewing riders. On land ice or snow, serious riders use a full set of knee and elbow pads, wrist guards and a back harness as well.

== History ==
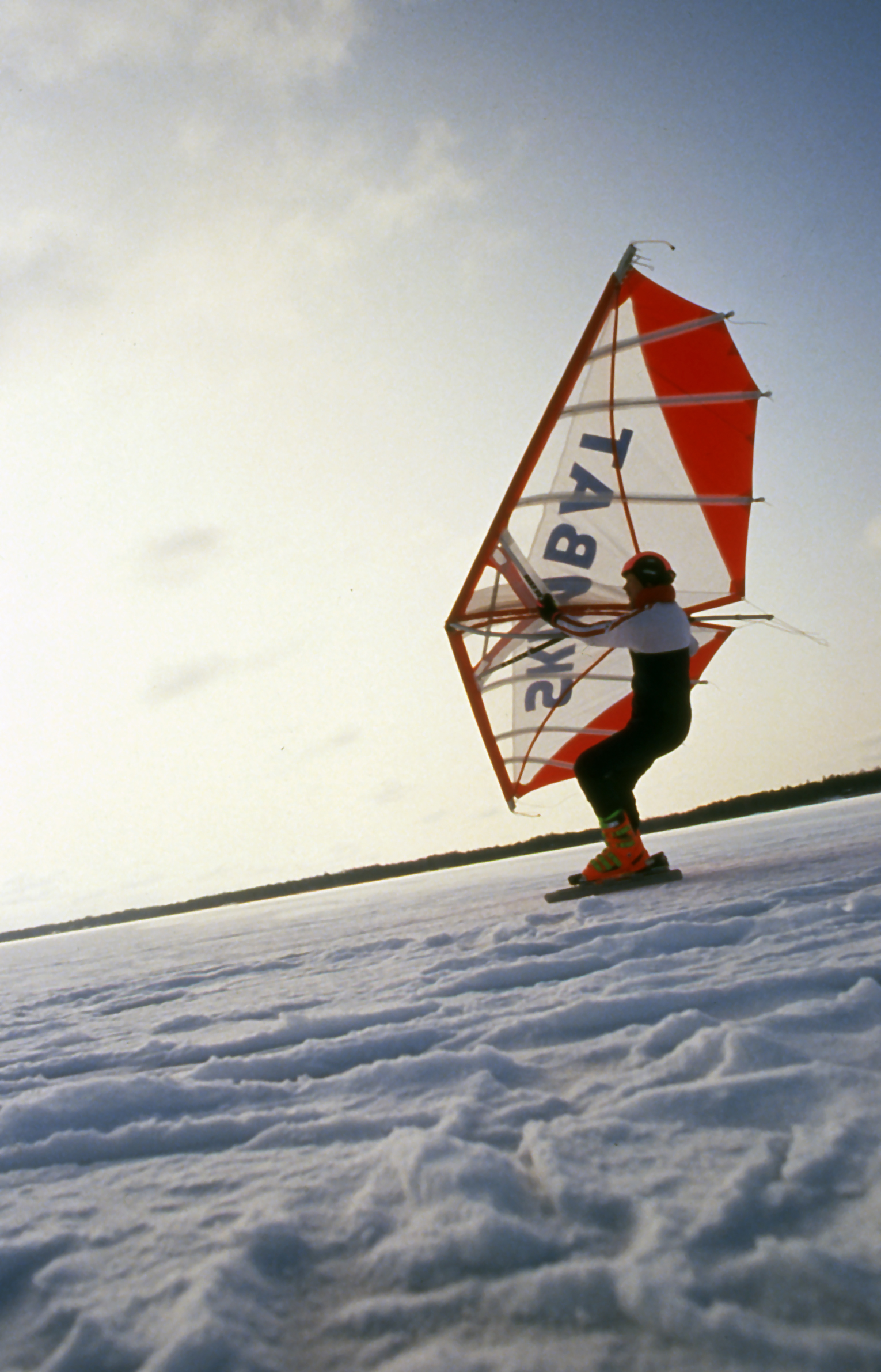
Sami Tuurna with his first prototype of SKIMBAT in year 1988

The origin of the Finnish Kitewing was a handheld wing developed by Sami Tuurna (born 1949) in 1986. Sami's tests with homemade wing prototypes and downhill skis on the ice outside Helsinki were mainly inspired by James Drake's handheld wing for use on water (1981).

Tuurna and Drake have a common background in windsurfing. Drake (1929–2012) is the co-inventor of windsurfing on water, and Sami patented WinterboarD (1981), a surfsled for sailing on ice and snow, using a windsurfing rig. The first World Ice and Snow Surfing Championships were arranged in 1983 by Sami. The races were authorised by the International Windsurfer Class Association -Europe. Races were performed with Windsurfer rigs in these one-design class races, on the ice outside Helsinki.

Tuurna's wing, originally named SkimBat, was taken in production by Tech Center Ltd in 1988, a consulting enterprise specialized in innovation, established by Carl-Magnus Fogelholm (born 1940). Initial testmarketing of SkimBat led to the establishment of Fogelholm's enterprise Skywings Ltd in 1993. The startup phase was funded by three Finnish state-oriented institutions; The Foundation of Finnish Inventions, Ministry of Trade and Industry and SITRA.

The original SkimBat was re-designed by Carl-Magnus using glassfibre masttubes by a pultrusion manufacturing process (Exel Ltd) and preshaped aluminium battens (quality 7075 T6). An innovative ‘nosejoint’ connects the masttubes to the boom. The wing shape was also modified by adding flexible glassfibre tip antennas (Exel Ltd), which reduces mechanical shock if the wingtip hits the ice. Y-tubes for the forehand and a curved boom for the rear hand were adopted from SkimBat. This rig concept guarantees a balanced control of the wing and an ergonomic and safe handling of the wing in all wind conditions. The new wing was granted an international patent to co-inventors Sami and Carl-Magnus.

SkimBat sails were initially produced by sailmakers in Finland. Sailmaking was outsourced to Neil Pryde in 1995, and later to other sailmakers in China. Skywings Ltd was renamed Kitewing Sports Ltd in 2006, when the wing was renamed Kitewing by an international trademark. SkimBats and Kitewings sized 4, 4.8, and 5.5 sq.m. were successfully produced in Espoo, Finland during the period of 1993–2015.

SkimBat was awarded Best Design prize and approved as a new racing class, handheld wings, by the World Ice and Snow Sailing Association, WISSA, in 1994. The wing was recognized as one of hundred most remarkable Finnish innovations in the 1900-century, by the Technical Research Centre of Finland in 2011.

Kitewing has been adopted as a winter sport in more than 30 countries. A water-based Kitewing, Wave Warrior (wingsize 7,5 sq.m), was introduced in 2005, together with a Kitewing board. Kitewing industrial rights were taken over by a US-based company, Kitewing Sports LLC, Grantham, New Hampshire in 2015.
