= Trude Mostue =

Norwegian veterinary surgeon and television presenter

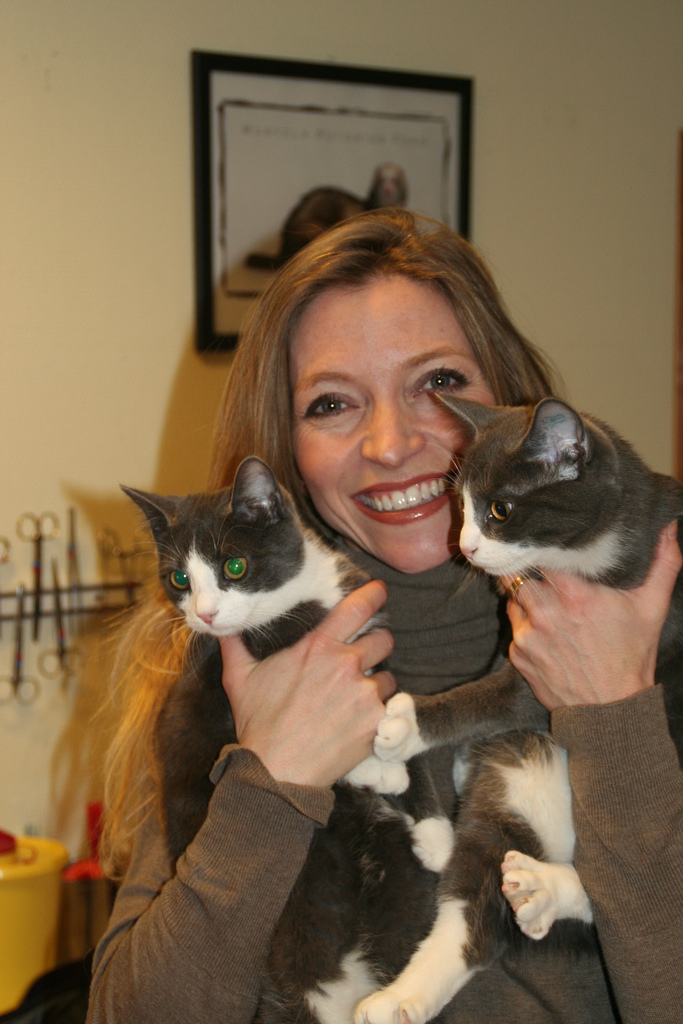
- Mostue with two cats Photo: Eirik Newth
- Born: 28 March 1968 (age 58); Oslo, Norway
- Occupations: Veterinary surgeon, television cast member, television presenter
- Years active: 1996–present
- Known for: Recurring roles in BBC veterinary and animal-related series and specials
- Television: Vets' School (1996); Vets in Practice (1997–2002)
- Children: Frøya Molly (born 2002); Erik Delme (born 2003); Hilda Nellie (born 2005); Celine Felicia (born 2011)

Trude Mostue (born 28 March 1968) is a Norwegian veterinary surgeon and television presenter. She is best known for her appearances in the BBC documentary series Vet School in 1996, and later in the follow-up series Vets in Practice. She went on to present and co-present a number of television series. After leaving England, Mostue has returned to veterinary practice full-time in Norway.

== Early life ==
Mostue was born in Oslo, Norway, and grew up in Siggerud.

== Television career ==
Mostue lived in the United Kingdom for several years, appearing in the BBC television documentary series Vet School (1996), and later in the follow-up series Vets in Practice (63 episodes, 1997–2002). She went on to present a variety of programmes relating to animals, including Vets to the Rescue, Explorer: Vets at Large, Vets on Holiday, Vets in the Wild, and Britain's Worst Pets.

She has also been in So Graham Norton, Holiday, Live & Kicking, The Heaven and Earth Show, Masterchef, and One Man and His Dog.

In 2006, she appeared on Skal vi danse, the Norwegian version of Strictly Come Dancing.

== Books ==
Mostue has published four books in the UK and one in Norway. Her UK titles include Pets in Practice (2000), Vets in the Wild: The Real Stories Behind the BBC Television Series (1999), and Wild About Animals: A book of beastly behaviour (1999).

== Professional veterinary practice ==
Mostue resides in Norway, where she co-owns a veterinary clinic, and has joined the board of Lildog AS, as a cat and dog behavioural expert, in developing an AI that detects symptoms of illnesses and injuries.

== Personal life ==
Mostue became engaged to Howard Thomas in 2000. In October 2006, Mostue and Thomas separated. In 2008, she met Cato Sælid, with whom she later had her last child, Celine Felicia (born 2011).
