= Moszczenica, Bochnia County =

Moszczenica
- Village
- Location within Poland
- Coordinates: 49°57′N 20°20′E
- Country: Poland
- Voivodeship: Lesser Poland
- County: Bochnia
- Gmina: Bochnia

Moszczenica [mɔʂt͡ʂɛˈnit͡sa] is a village in the administrative district of Gmina Bochnia, within Bochnia County, Lesser Poland Voivodeship, in southern Poland.
