= Joe Inglis =

British veterinarian (born 1972/73)

- Occupations: Television presenter, veterinary surgeon, entrepreneur
- Spouse(s): Emma Milne (ex); Jenny Smith
- Children: 3
- Website: www.joeinglis.co.uk

Joe Inglis (born 1972 or 1973) is a British veterinary surgeon and television presenter. He is best known for his appearances on television advising viewers on pet issues. Inglis is the author of several books, the first, It Really Does Happen to a Vet!, is a diary of his first year in veterinary practice.

== Career ==
While studying to be a vet at Bristol University, Inglis was filmed for the British reality TV show Vet School. He qualified as a vet in 1996, and went on to appear for seven years in Vets in Practice, the follow-up to Vet School, as well as a catch-up series in 2008 called Return to... Vets in Practice. Inglis was the resident vet on Blue Peter for four years, appeared on BBC One's The One Show, held pet clinics on Channel 5's The Wright Stuff, and appeared on ITV's breakfast show, Daybreak.

In 2005, Inglis launched the dog food range Joe & Jack's Natural Dinners, which was sold in the UK by Tesco from 2008, and in 2010, he launched a pet food brand, Vet's Kitchen.

Inglis was the CEO of a Vet's Klinik, a veterinary practice in Swindon, which opened in 2012.

In 2013, Inglis was one of several co-founders of tails.com, a company which produces bespoke pet foods for dogs. That year, he collaborated with chef Simon Rimmer to create a series of fancy meals for cats, in order to raise money for the RSPCA.

== Personal life ==
Inglis resides in the Cotswolds with his second wife, Jenny Smith, and their three children: Poppy, Owen and Emily. Inglis met Smith when both were working on Blue Peter. Inglis was previously married to Emma Milne.

Away from his veterinary work, Inglis is a sculptor; his work was first exhibited in 2016.

== Bibliography ==
- It Really Does Happen to a Vet!. Sidgwick & Simpson. 1999. ISBN 0-283-06343-2.
- Greatest Dog Tips in the World. Greatest in the World. 2006. ISBN 9781905151097.
- Greatest Cat Tips in the World. Greatest in the World. 2006. ISBN 9781905151103.
- Doggie Dinners. Greatest in the World. 2007. ISBN 9781905151158.
- The Greatest Doggie Dinners in the World. Greatest in the World. 2007. ISBN 9781905151516.
- Feline Feasts. Greatest in the World. 2007. ISBN 9781905151141.
- The Greatest Feline Feasts in the World. Greatest in the World. 2007. ISBN 9781905151509.
- Your Dog and You: A Guide to a Healthy Life with Your Best Friend. Perseus Books. 2010. ISBN 9781782196044.
