= Open Air Laboratories =

British citizen science initiative

The Open Air Laboratories (OPAL) network is a UK-wide citizen science initiative that aims to get the public more involved with nature through a range of local and national projects. It aimed to make the public more interested in science through enabling them to record data for scientists across many areas of environmental science, and then see the interpretation of these records.

It is a partnership organisation, led by Imperial College London, and includes leading museums, universities, environmental organisations, and Government agencies across the UK.

It developed activities and resources, including seven national nature surveys, which allow people to get closer to their local environment while collecting important scientific data. It also arranges and take part in nature events and workshops around the country. Schools and other organisations took part as well as individuals.

It is largely funded by the Big Lottery Fund and began in 2007, operating across England. There was an emphasis on involving disadvantaged people and communities. Community scientists were placed to facilitate the surveys. Since January 2014, it has begun expanding into Scotland, Wales and Northern Ireland thanks to a further grant.

== Soil and earthworm survey ==
The OPAL soil and earthworm survey was launched in March 2009 by the OPAL Soil Centre at Imperial College London, supported by a number of celebrities including Steve Leonard and Chris Packham. The survey aims to learn more about soil and earthworm distribution in England and the effects that humans are having on soil quality. Members of the public are asked to upload their findings directly onto the OPAL website, and results are then analysed by Imperial College London, which is also coordinating the survey.

== Air survey ==
The OPAL air survey launched in September 2009 and is coordinated by Imperial College London. The survey asks people to look for lichens on trees and tar spot fungus on sycamore leaves and then record their results online. The survey is helping scientists learn more about the effects of air pollution, and is supported by a number of organisations including the British Lichen Society.

== Water survey ==
The OPAL water survey launched in May 2010 and is coordinated by University College London (UCL). The survey asks people to go pond-dipping and identify the invertebrates living in their local pond or lake. Using this information they can then find out how polluted the water is, as some creatures are more tolerant of pollution than others. Results are collected online and will help scientists learn more about lakes and ponds across England.

== Biodiversity survey ==
The OPAL biodiversity survey launched in September 2010, coordinated by the Open University (OU). The survey asks the public to investigate their hedges and look for invertebrates and other signs of wildlife. Hedges are incredibly important habitats for many creatures and the survey aims to raise awareness and learn more about life in hedges across the country.

== Climate survey ==
The OPAL climate survey launched in March 2011, coordinated by the Met Office. It asked people to look for contrails in the sky, estimate their thermal comfort, and measure wind using bubbles. The results are helping scientists learn more about the ways we affect our climate, and how we may adapt to it. Results submissions for this survey closed on 31 March 2014.

== Bugs Count ==
The Bugs Count survey launched in June 2011 and was led by the Natural History Museum. It aims to collect data on bugs and other invertebrates that live all around us by asking the public to count invertebrates in timed challenges and look out for six particular bugs in the Species Quest.

The Natural History Museum also developed the free Bugs Count app for iPhone and Android.

== Tree health survey ==
The OPAL tree health survey launched in May 2013 in partnership with Forest Research and the Food and Environment Research Agency (FERA). It aims to build a picture of the health of trees across country by asking the public to record data about the size and appearance of their tree while also looking for signs of pests and diseases. This includes six serious pests and diseases, referred to as the Most Unwanted, which are not yet established in the UK and could cause serious damage to the tree population.

This survey has also been extended to Wales and Scotland in partnership with Natural Resources Wales and the Scottish Government.

The Food and Environment Agency also developed the free tree health survey app for iPhone and Android.

== Community Environment Report ==
In January 2013, OPAL published the Community Environment Report, summarising the findings of the first five years of the project and its contribution to citizen science.

The report showed that more than half a million people across England had been involved in OPAL activities, many of whom were carrying out a nature survey for the very first time. Their data had also provided scientists with information about locations that had not been sampled before and may not otherwise have been studied.

== UK-wide expansion ==
In August 2013, the Big Lottery Fund confirmed a further funding grant to OPAL enabling it to expand into Scotland, Wales and Northern Ireland with a new team of partners between 2014 and 2016.
