= Freeboard (skateboard) =

Skateboard designed to simulate the behavior of a snowboard

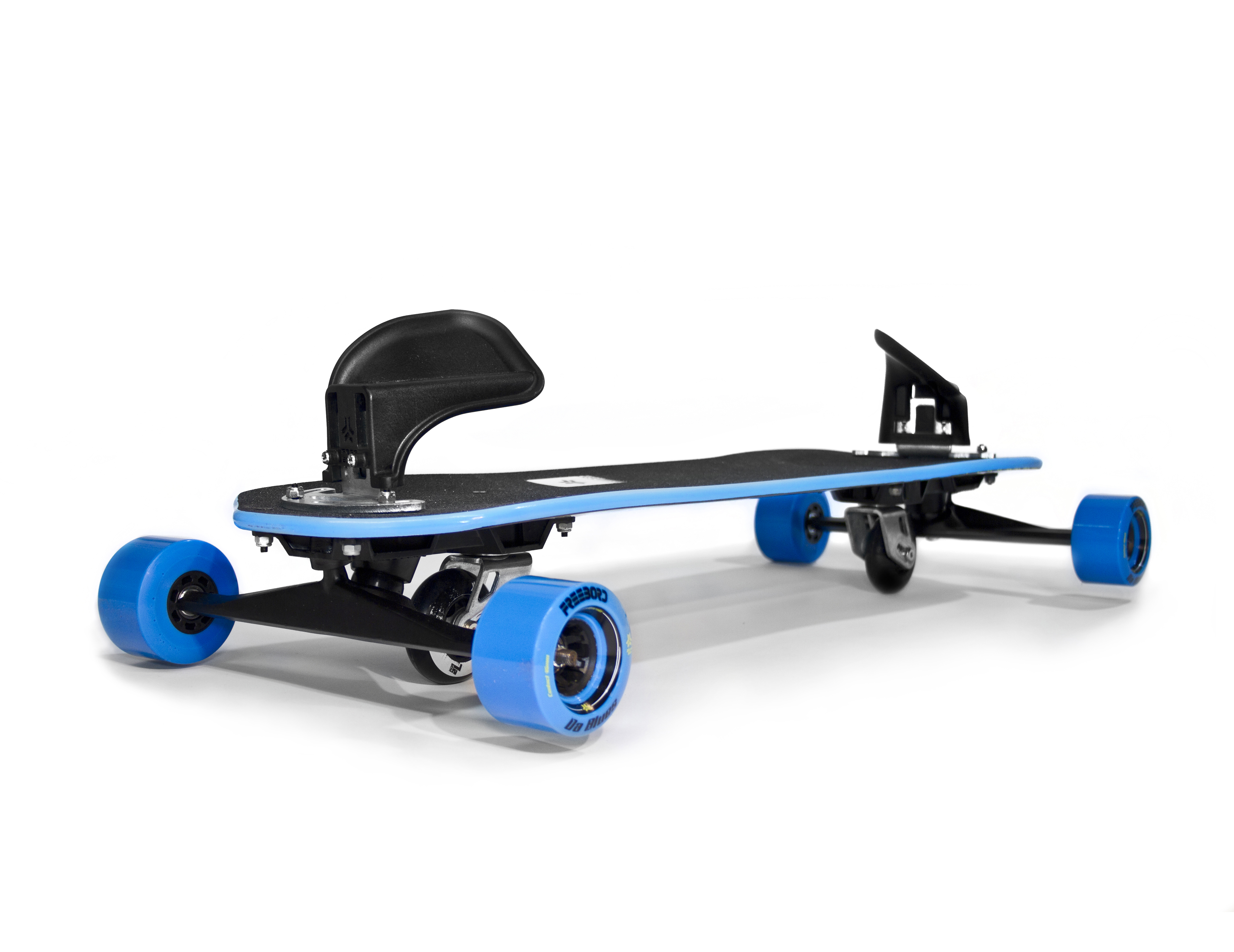
A Freebord brand freeboard (2013 design).

A freeboard is a specialist skateboard designed to closely simulate the behavior of a snowboard. Freeboards were developed to allow snowboarders to transition to skateboarding (as non-winter transport) without the need to adapt to a smaller deck and narrower wheel-base.

== History ==
Steen Strand conceived the idea for a freeboard as part of his master's thesis in product design at Stanford University, which he expanded into the freeboard style skateboard in 1996. After releasing an Alpha series featuring kicktails and longer decks (100 – 112 cm) than his more recent versions, Strand began retailing his freeboards under the brand name Freebord in the late 1990s. By the mid-2000s other freeboard styles and brands had emerged and were developing strong retail track records in mainstream sporting goods stores.

=== Freebord brand ===
After developing the freeboard in 1996, Strand released two models under the Freebord brand in 1998; the FB-112 and the FB-110. The company patented designs relating to the Freebord brand freeboards. Though other companies have since developed their own freeboards and marketed them under alternate brand names, Freebord remains one of the largest producers of freeboards in the world. By 2000, the company had sold 4000 boards. In 2005, the company signed deals to have their product distributed to snowboarding enthusiasts in Europe The company continues to produce and market freeboards under the Freebord trademark.

== Features and technique ==
A freeboard typically has six wheels: four normal longboard-style wheels at each corner and two spring-locked center wheels. The wheels on the central axis are able to turn freely in all directions, allowing the board to "slide" laterally provided none of the four corner wheels are touching the ground. This mimics the traditional "side-to-side" motion of snowboard riding. By exerting pressure on the corner wheels, the rider is able to control the board.

Decks are usually constructed with seven-ply cross-laminated Canadian maple, although now there are bamboo models available as well. Modern decks vary in size, but most are 7.5 to 9 inches wide and between 29 and 36 inches long. Snowboard-style bindings that keep the feet on the board yet allow for some movement are used to provide more control over the board and allow the rider to exert more pressure on the corner wheels and edges. As on a snowboard, the rider is able to perform both carve and slide turns (skidded turns).

"Freeride" and "freestyle" both refer to the way in which a freeboard is used. The term "freeride" refers to plain riding with little or no tricks, usually consisting of carving and sliding. Another name for freeride can be "Downhill". A bigger board is used for downhill freeboarding or freeriding as this gives you better balance allowing you to go faster. The term "freestyle" as used in other boardsports such as skateboarding means doing tricks like skating off ramps, grinding rails, jumping, etc. Smaller boards are usually used for freestyle as not only will they be lighter making them easier to jump with, but the rider can more easily push his feet outwards so as to make sure that his feet stay in the bindings.

== See also ==
- Boardsports
- Dirtsurfing
