= Longboarding =

Subdiscipline of skateboarding

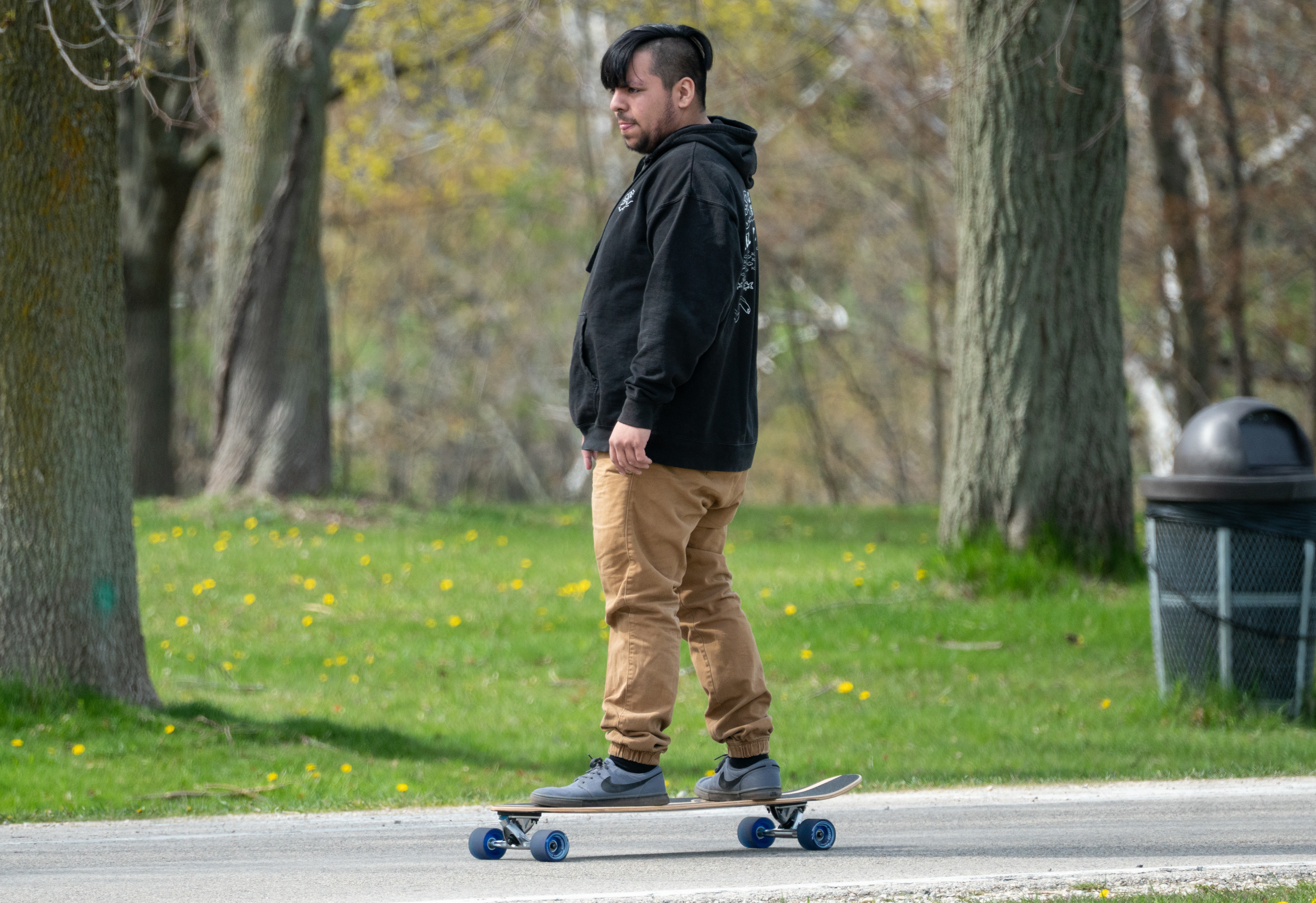
Cruising on a longboard

Longboarding is a variation of skateboarding typified by the use of longer boards ("decks") with longer wheelbases and softer wheels. While longboards vary widely in shape and size, compared to street skateboards longboards are designed to be more stable at speed and to have more traction due to larger wheel sizes and softer wheel durometers. While standard street skateboards may typically be between 28 and 34 inches long, longboards can range anywhere from 32 to 50 inches in length. Ride characteristics of longboards generally differ from that of street skateboards due to the use of specialized longboard trucks that have different properties than those typically used with skateboards; while street skateboards use "traditional kingpin" (TKP) trucks that are optimized for tight turning radii, ollie and flip tricks, slides, grinds, and transition skating, longboards are typically paired with "reverse kingpin" (RKP) trucks that are designed for increased stability at higher speeds, more "surfy" carving characteristics, and/or greater ride comfort for commuting over longer distances.

The term "longboarding" encompasses multiple disciplines. These include downhill/race, freeride, freestyle, dance, and long-distance pushing (LDP). Longboarding's disciplines vary significantly in terms of physical requirements, intensity/impact, risk, and intended user base. While it is not altogether uncommon for riders to practice multiple variations of longboarding, there are dedicated communities for downhill and freeride, freestyle and dance, and long-distance push.

== History ==
The idea of longboarding originated with surfers in Hawaii in the 1950s, who sought to bring surfing to land. They made a new kind of skateboard of thick plywood shaped into a smaller version of a surfboard, with trucks and wheels screwed to the decks, and used their surfing moves on small hills.

In the 1970s, a small group of longboarders honed their techniques, and some were profiled in a 1978 SkateBoarder magazine article, "Cult of the Longboard". These pioneers saw longboarding as a form of self-expression, and were influenced by surfing. Despite the advent of polyurethane wheels (referred to as "thane" by longboarders), longboarding did not become popular until the 1970s.

Longboarding lived on as an underground sport with home hobbyists continuing to make boards in their garages or strap trucks onto snowboard decks using old Kryptonic wheels from the 1970s or roller skating wheels.

Randal Truck Company created the first Reverse Kingpin Trucks(RKP) in 1984.

In the early 1990s, Sector 9 started mass-producing and selling longboards.

The Internet has made it possible for small groups of skateboarders to communicate with each other and also gain an audience they might not have had locally, allowing the sport to grow further. Silverfish Longboarding was an active message board website during the 2000s and early 2010s before it closed, operated by Malkai Kingston. Multiple subbranches of longboarding exist with relatively small but hardcore groups of adherents like slalom, LDP (long-distance pushing/pumping), downhill, dance, freeriding, technical hard wheel sliding and more.

While diversifying, longboarding has also come back around full circle to embrace more street-oriented tricks and crossover events using ramps while continuing its earlier beginnings in slalom, ditch skating, cornering, and seeking to reach greater speeds.

== Uses ==
=== Transportation ===
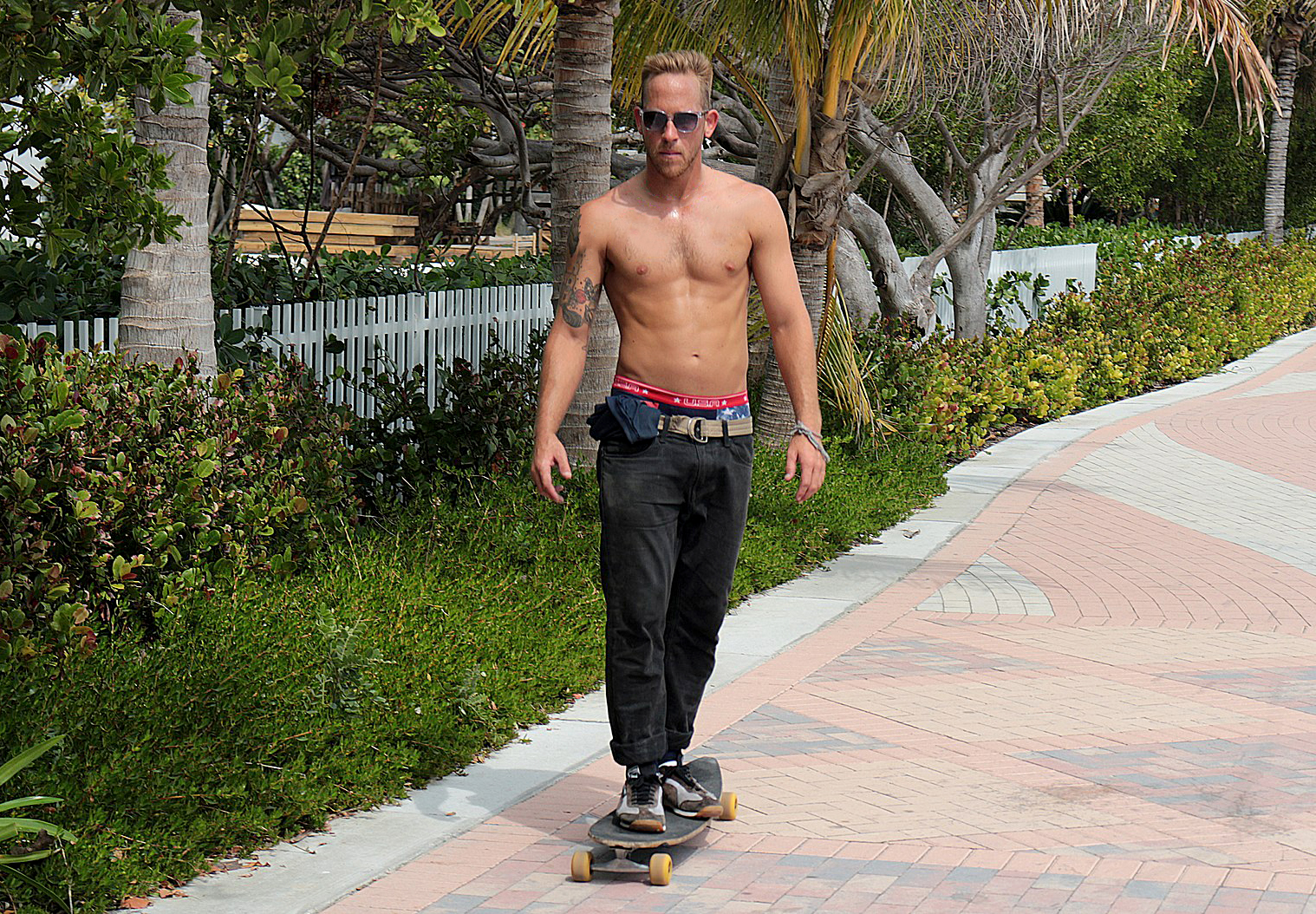
Longboarding as a form of transport

Longboards are commonly used for commuting in urban environments due to their smoother ride and stability.

Commuter longboarding uses designs that take many different shapes, including long, wide cruisers as well as shorter hybrid boards. Their trucks are designed to be loose to allow for sharper turns. It is useful to have a kicktail on a commuting longboard to corner on sidewalks and lift the front of the board when riding off curbs.

Generally a shorter board, 24–35 in (610–890 mm), is used for commuting, with medium-sized 65–75 mm (2.6–3.0 in) wheels to overcome bumps, cracks and other minor surface obstacles. Commuting by longboard can be more difficult in jurisdictions that restrict skateboarding and treat longboards as a kind of skateboard, and longboarders have been cited for unauthorized skateboarding.

=== Freeride ===
"Freeride" is a newer variation of downhill developed in the mid to late 2000s that focuses on sliding in creative ways, typically without the use of slide pucks. The decks, which are often symmetrical, may have kicktails on both sides that allow for tech slides. These decks are typically 36–44 in (910–1,120 mm) long and 8.5–10.5 in (220–270 mm) wide. Most freeride decks utilize similar construction to downhill boards. Some companies are now trying to produce freeride decks that also do freestyle. They make these hybrid boards using lighter materials and adding kicktails.

=== Downhill ===
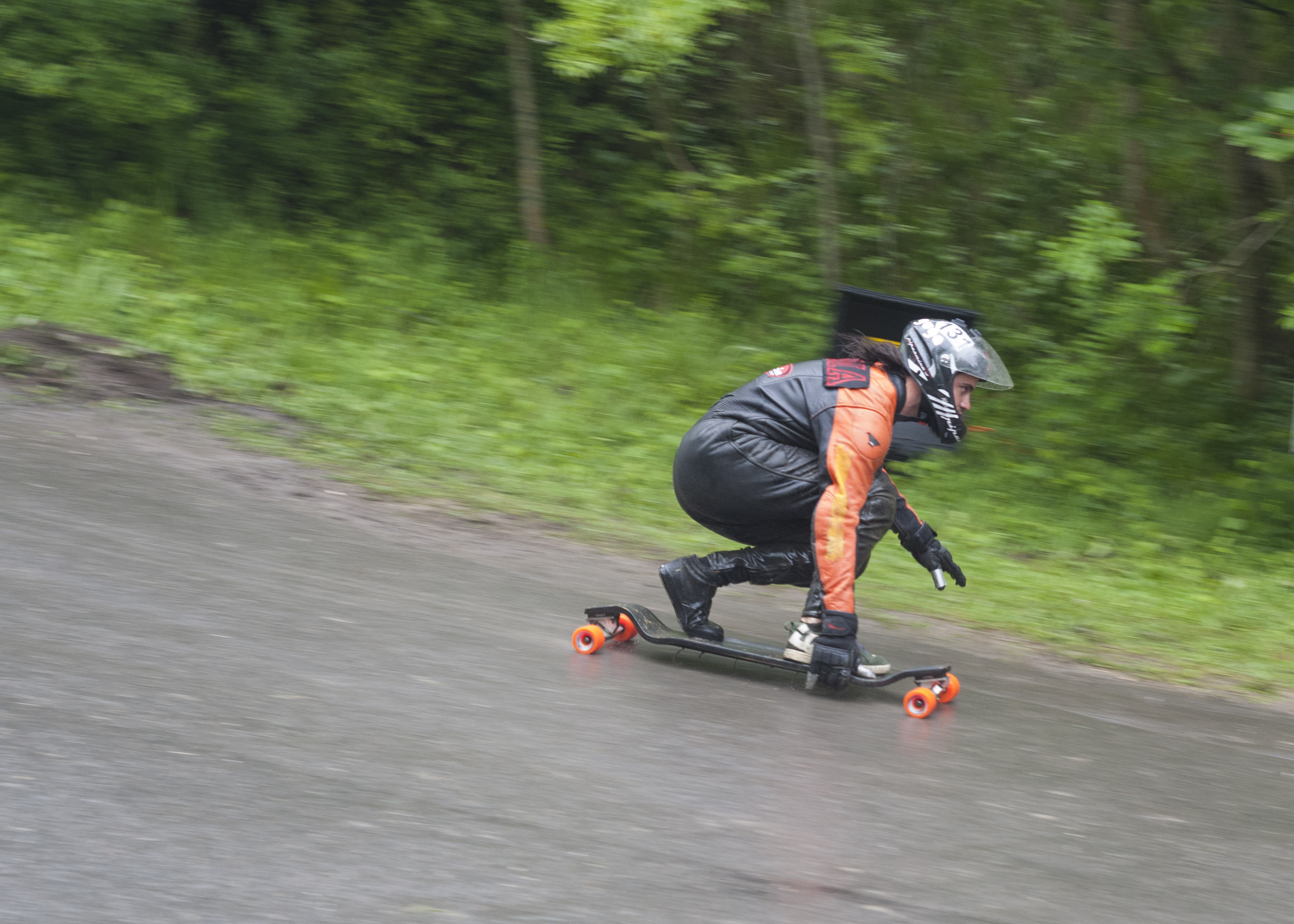
Wet-weather freeride downhill on a Landyachtz Evo longboard, Bo Peep Hill, UK, 2012

Downhill longboarding (also referred to as downhill skateboarding or speedboarding) is usually done with gloves with slide pucks as a point of stability. It features speeds faster than one can push, generally between 20 miles per hour and 80 miles per hour. Speeds in excess of 80 mph have been obtained. These boards are usually 95–110 cm (37–43 in) long, with wheelbases of 28–35 in (710–890 mm), and are very stiff to improve control at speed. "Speed wobbles" pose a problem for beginner downhill riders but intermediate and advanced users overcome this keeping their weight on their front foot and elevating the heel of their back foot. Downhill decks usually fall into Six categories: top mount, micro drop, drop thru, drop deck, double drop and flush mount. Topmount boards provide the most traction but tend to be less forgiving. Micro Drops lower the ride height slightly, which results in a great all around board. Drop thru decks consist of mounting the baseplates of the trucks on top of the board with the trucks hanging through a hole. Like micro drops these tend to be all around boards and were very popular 2009–2011. Drop Decks get the rider very close to the ground, providing an easy to push and drifty ride. Double Drop decks are a drop deck with drop thru truck mounts. These decks were fairly popular in the mid-2000s but have largely fallen out of favor due to their unresponsiveness. Flush mounts seek to lower the ride height by mounting the trucks in a recessed area on the board. This minimally lowers ride height but increases the chance for wheel bite (which is where the wheels rub against the board in a turn, usually resulting in a crash). The vast majority of downhill longboards are built from wood. The three most common woods used are Maple, Baltic Birch and Bamboo. Maple is less prone to fracturing during construction than Baltic Birch, and as such is used in almost all high-end boards. Other materials used in longboard construction are: 1) Carbon fiber with a foam, balsa or hollow core. 2) Aluminum, either pressed or milled. And 3) Carbon Nano Tubes, although this proved prone to failure and no current company is using this material.

Downhill boards and freeride boards are often used interchangeably. The main distinguishing factor is that downhill boards are usually directional, with a defined front and rear, while freeride boards are symmetrical front to back.

Downhill longboarders usually use Reverse Kingpin Trucks (RKP), whereas skateboarders use Traditional Kingpin Trucks. RKP trucks tend to hold traction better and are easier to handle at speed, whereas TKP trucks are more suited for tricks, bowl skating and usually sport a lower ride height. Other forms of trucks have been seen in the downhill but remain on the sidelines. These would include torsion trucks (seismic) and CAM trucks (Other Planet). Downhill trucks are separated into two further categories: Cast and Precision. Cast trucks are the economical choice as well as the most common, although Precision Trucks are becoming more common. Cast trucks are usually a gravity cast aluminum with a solid steel axle that is non-removable. Due to the casting process cast trucks have 'slop' which is caused by small gaps in between parts. This causes small shifts and movements at speed and results in slightly diminished control. Cast trucks are also prone to warping slightly, causing uneven contact pressure on the wheels. Precision trucks can counter these limitations at a much higher price tag, although not all brands achieve this equally. Precision trucks are milled out of Aluminum billet and usually house two separate axles.

The angle and width of trucks also come into play with most falling in the 35°-52° range. A 45° truck is the center point, providing an equal ratio of lean to turn while also providing the most overall turn. A higher degree truck initiates a turn faster with less lean, but reduces the overall turn of the system. This is useful for riders seeking to maximize traction. A lower angle truck initiates a turn slower with more lean, and this results in less overall turn. These trucks are useful for making sliding easier, and also for many beginners who are struggling with speed wobble. The most common widths used are 115-200mm, with 150mm and 180mm being the most common. Generally, a narrower truck increases traction but is less forgiving. However, this is directly related to the width of the board as the truck and the board work together to form a level against the bushing.

=== Freestyle and dancing ===
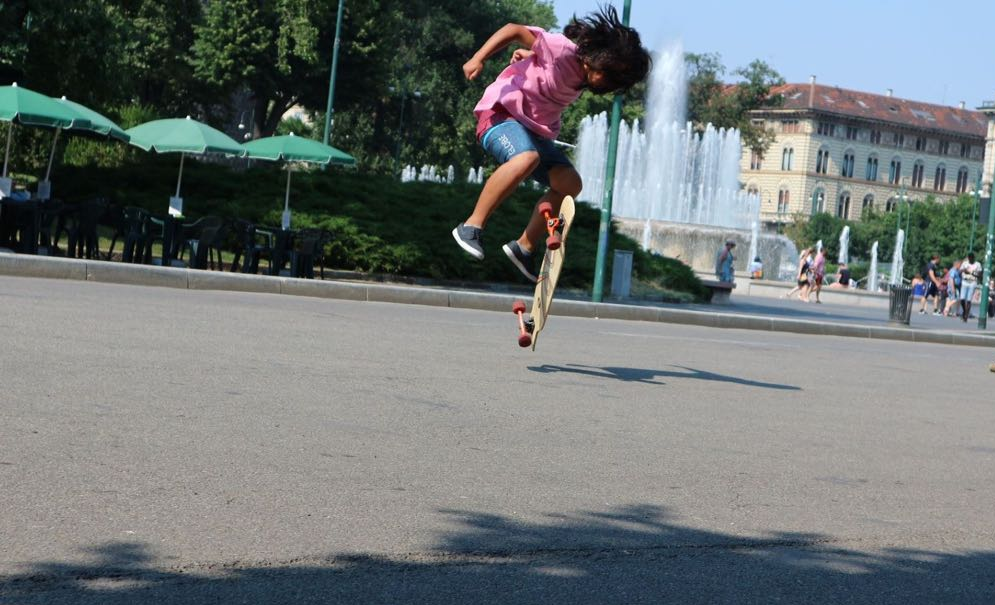
Freestyle

"Freestyle" is a flat-ground discipline of longboarding that combines the skateboarding flip tricks with an increased use of one's feet touching the ground and their hands grabbing/picking up the board. "Dancing" is a flat-ground discipline that often overlaps demographics with freestyle. It incorporates smooth, rhythmic stepping motions while riding, inspired by traditional forms of non-wheeled dancing. Dancing is a resurgence of old-school tricks in longboarding that involves a variety of walking and spinning moves. It originates from boardwalking in surfing. A board is usually considered a dancing board when it is 45 in (1,100 mm), or more, long and can be up to 12 in (300 mm) wide, and although most of the tricks can be performed on smaller decks, a larger deck provides a more comfortable platform and is less restrictive to maneuver.

The competitive landscape of longboard dancing has expanded globally, with significant circuits emerging in South America, such as the Dancing Shoes Latinoamérica tournament. The regional industry's growth was highlighted in 2026 when the Argentine-based company Manija Boards became the first Latin American brand to serve as an official sponsor and jury member for the So... Longboard Dancing World Cup in the Netherlands.

=== Racing ===
==== Downhill ====
In downhill skateboard racing there are two main styles: stand-up and luge. The format is the same only in luge the rider lays with their back with feet facing downhill on the board. Most people do stand-up. In downhill racing the different courses are separated by difficulty. Each race is separated by gender and age. The race sections are Open, Women, Juniors, Masters, and Luge. A race usually starts with four riders at the start line. However some events can have more or less riders at the start, depending on the track difficulty. A gun or buzzer is fired to begin the race. After, the rider goes into a speed tuck. These tucks are used to make the body as aerodynamic as possible. This is done by having the rider lean over and bend their knees with their hands behind their back. The first rider to the bottom wins.

==== Long distance ====
"Long-distance push" is most comparable to road cycling or marathon running, with the goal being to maximize pushing distance. Long distance skateboard racing involves human-powered skating with propulsion from pushing, pumping, or both. The International Distance Skateboarding Association is the governing body for the sport.

Some notable races include:

- The 24-Hour Ultraskate in Miami, Florida
- The Adrenalina Skateboard Marathon in San Diego, California
- The Broadway Bomb in New York, New York
- The Dutch Ultraskate
- Beijing Longboard Marathon in Beijing, China

=== Travel ===
Longboards can be used for traveling long distances. Long distance skating with charitable fundraising has even emerged (see Charitable distance skating). Any skateboard can be used for long-distance journeys, however, decks designed specifically for long-distance trips are typically lower to the ground than regular top mounted longboards. Common ways to lower the decks are in the construction of the boards; drop-through mounting allows for the whole board to be mounted lower on the trucks and can be combined with a drop-down deck. Drop-down decks are shaped to allow the riders feet to ride lower than where the trucks are mounted. A lower deck increases stability and makes for easy pushing and foot braking.

=== Slalom ===
Slaloming is the act of weaving in and out of a line of obstacles. Riders often compete for the fastest time through the course. Pedestrian slalom (usually referred to as civilian slalom because of the alliteration) is a non-competitive form of this discipline in which riders simply swerve around whatever obstacles they find in their path while navigating from point A to B.

=== Electric longboarding ===
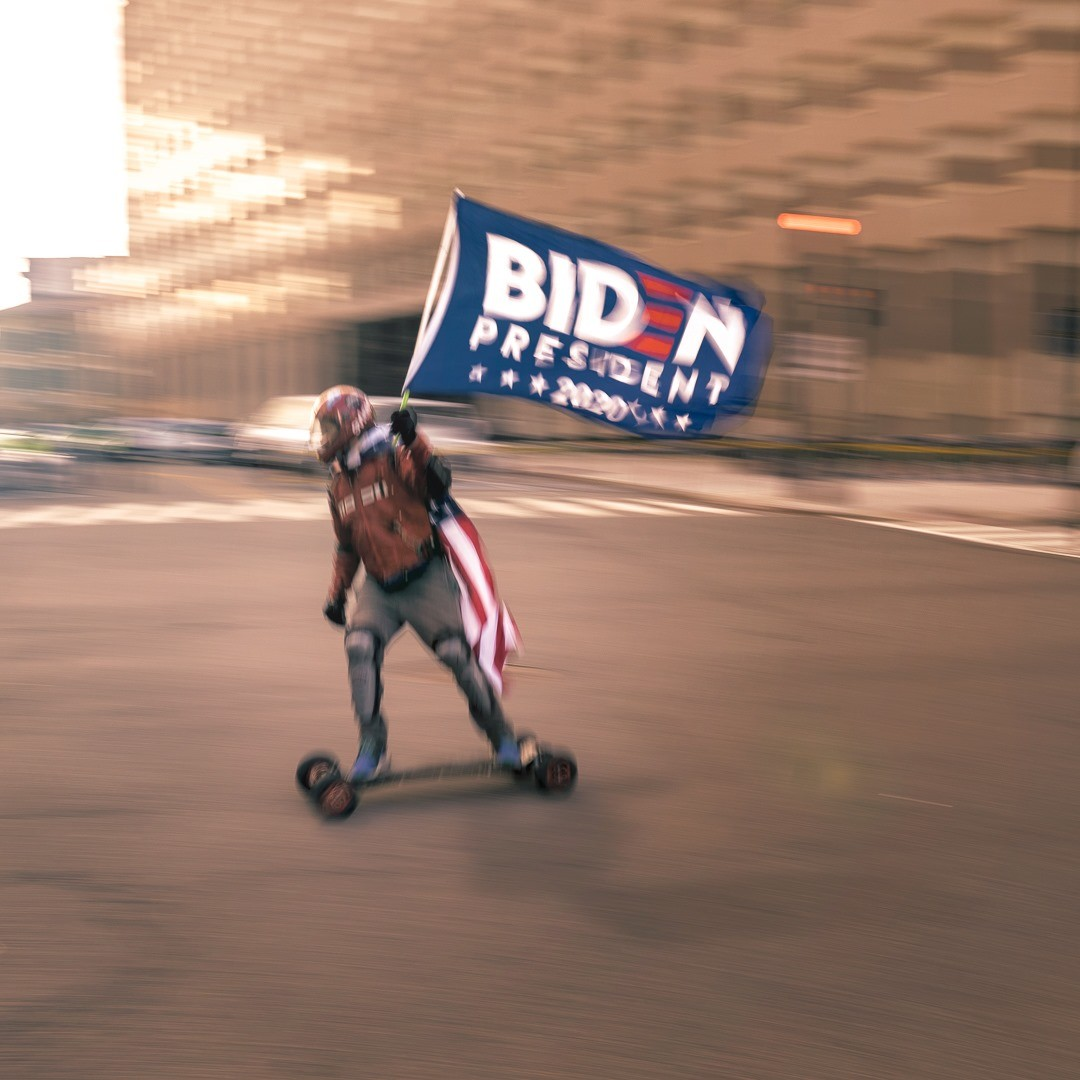
Electric longboarding

The electric longboard is a variant of the original longboard and a new way of transport. It is essentially a longboard with a motor connected, usually to the rear wheels, and can be used to travel longer distances.

== Records ==
The land speed record on a longboard of 146.73 km/h (91.17 mph) was set in 2017 by Peter Connolly.

The marathon record is held by Cami Best, who skated for 2 hours 1 minute 7 seconds at the 2011 Adrenalina in New York City. The men's record of 1 hour 32 minutes 13 seconds is held by Paul Kent, set in the 2011 Adrenalina Skateboard Marathon in Hallandale Beach, Florida.

The record for distance skated in 24 hours is held by Rick Pronk, who skated 313 miles (504 km) at the 2017 Dutch Ultraskate. The women's record is held by Saskia Tromp, who skated 262 miles (422 km) at the same event.

A record for the longest distance traveled on a longboard was set by David Cornthwaite in 2006 when he skated 3,638.26 miles (5,855.21 km) across Australia, from Perth to Brisbane. That record was broken by Rob Thomas of New Zealand, who skated 7,555 miles (12,159 km).

== Riding techniques ==
=== Sliding (riding) ===
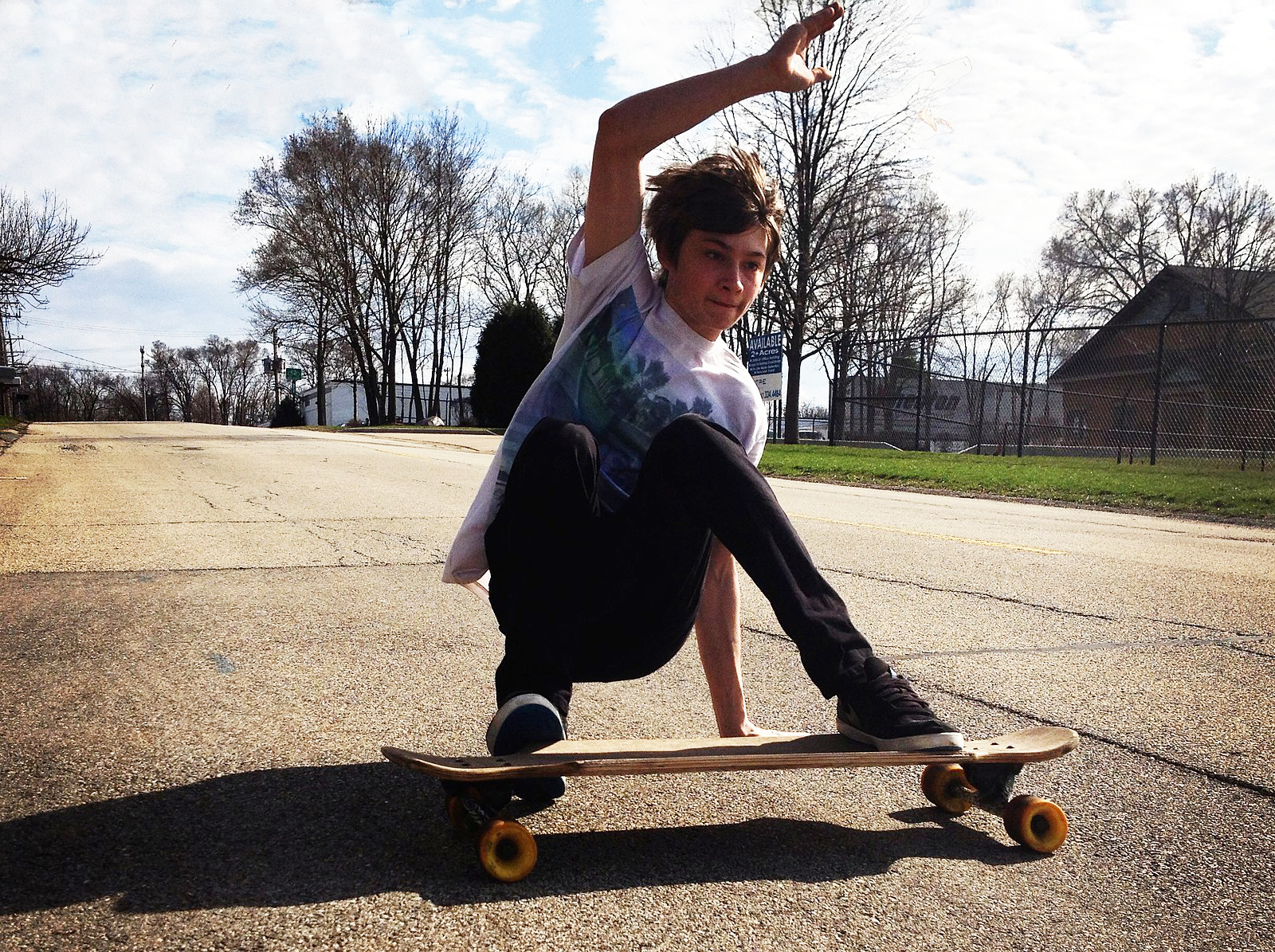
Sliding longboard technique

In addition to its role as a braking technique, sliding has evolved into its own discipline within skateboarding, with riders performing various tricks and rotations while sliding. Specific slides include the coleman slide, bert slide, and pendulum. Sliding can be performed on any wheel. Harder wheels (83-86a) will slide less smoothly and break traction easier while softer wheels (70-80a) will be harder to break traction but will lead to a smoother more controllable slide. Softer wheels, especially (70-75a), tend to wear out faster. Slides can be done standing upright or with one or two hands placed on the road to allow the rider to execute technical slides in any number of positions. When performing hands-down slides, protective slide gloves must be worn. These gloves can be purchased or made at home. They are usually leather gloves with sliding pucks made of hard, low-friction plastics such as UHMWPE, Corian, or Delrin attached by velcro or glue. Sliding gloves can also be bought online or at local skate shops. Gloves are commonly made by companies such as Sector 9, Vault, Landyachtz, Arbor and Loaded. Slides can also be performed on banks and transitions in a skate park. When a skater slides to a complete stop, it is called a shutdown slide. A drift that reduces the rider's speed without bringing them to a complete stop is called a speed check. Riders will also do a partial slide called a pre-drift before a corner to trim speed and then hook back up and grip the corner. When the board rotates more than 90 degrees and then returns to its original position over the course of the slide it is called a pendulum. There are myriad more technical and challenging slides that can be done such as laybacks, pressure spins, 5-0 slides, and stand-up rotations. One of the most popular slide and most basic hands-down slide is called the Coleman. Made popular by Cliff Coleman, the Coleman slide is the most popular slide used to come to a complete stop, as the rider does a complete 180-degree turn with one hand on the ground.

=== Carving ===
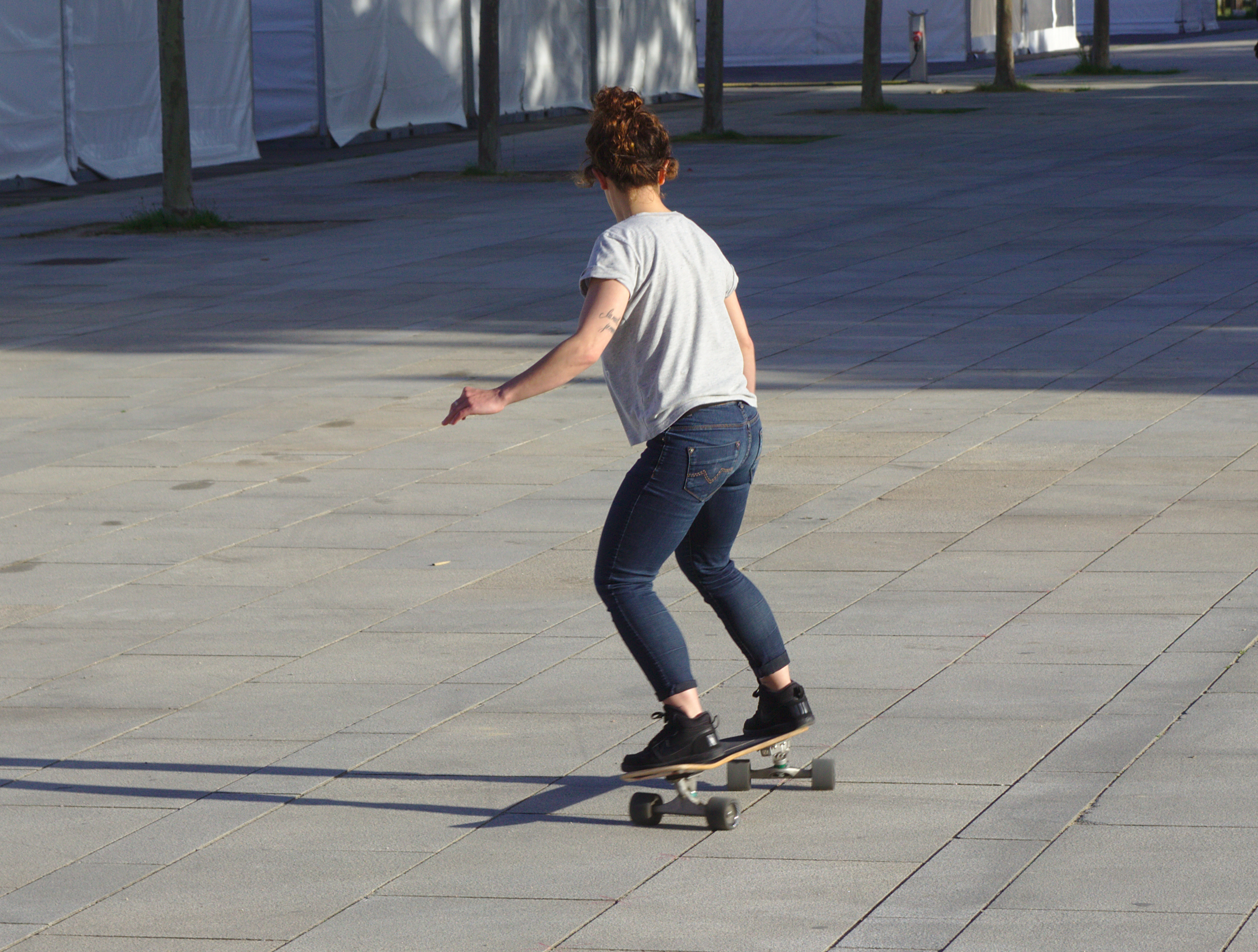
Carving

Carving is an effective way to control speed when traveling downhill. Instead of coming to a complete stop, the rider makes a continuous "S" path by leaning left and right. By making many turns speed can be controlled and maintained.

Boards with camber are specifically designed for carving. A camber board is usually made of a flexible wood like bamboo, and the center of the deck will be higher than the mounting point of the trucks creating an arc shape. When weight is applied the center will bend down, creating a reverse of the arc shape. This builds spring tension, that is released at the peak of every complete turn in the "S" pattern.

=== Pumping ===
Pumping a skateboard is a technique used and perfected in slalom skateboarding. It is a technique used to maintain speed without the rider taking their feet off of the skateboard. The motion itself is somewhat unorthodox and it requires the rider to be very in sync with their center of gravity and skateboard. The act of pumping a longboard is the bending of ones knees in the direction of a turn to compensate for the gravitational forces in order to maintain speed. Boards made specifically for pumping usually consist of large longboard wheels which range anywhere from 60mm to 80mm. These wheels are normally soft to promote grip and have rebound urethane to maintain the resilience of the wheel. The trucks on the skateboard are also essential to how it will pump. Bennett Vectors are a very popular pumping truck and when mixed with the right durometer (measure of hardness) bushings experienced boarders can travel long distances without touching a foot to the ground. In a skateboarding world full of kick flips and 900's, pumping had become virtually extinct. Now it is beginning to make a revival with the popularity of alternative transportation and longboard distance skating.

=== Early grabs ===
Early grabbing is a technique of achieving height that originated in old school skateboarding, in which the rider grabs the board and lifts it while initiating a jumping motion. The most common technique of doing this is by placing the right hand (for switch riders) or left hand (for regular riders) on the backside of the board between the legs, for this tends to be the technique that gives the body the least resistance when jumping/lifting. Although this has become semi-obsolete due to freeriding alternatives with kicktails which have the ability to ollie (ex. Loaded Chubby Unicorn, Omen Sugar, DK penguin), it is commonly practiced on decks that lack tails (ex. Landyachtz 9 two 5, Comet Grease Shark, Earthwing Supermodel) and can be used to navigate the environment more easily (over ledges, off ledges, and off kickers).

=== Cross step ===
One of the most important core tricks for longboard dancing. Cross steps involve moving the rider's back foot around the front, flipping the front around the back, and moving into a switched position from the rider's natural stance. Carve during this trick for extra style by crossing closer to the edge. Cross steps can be used to change positions with style and flow to the riders cruising.

=== Land paddling ===
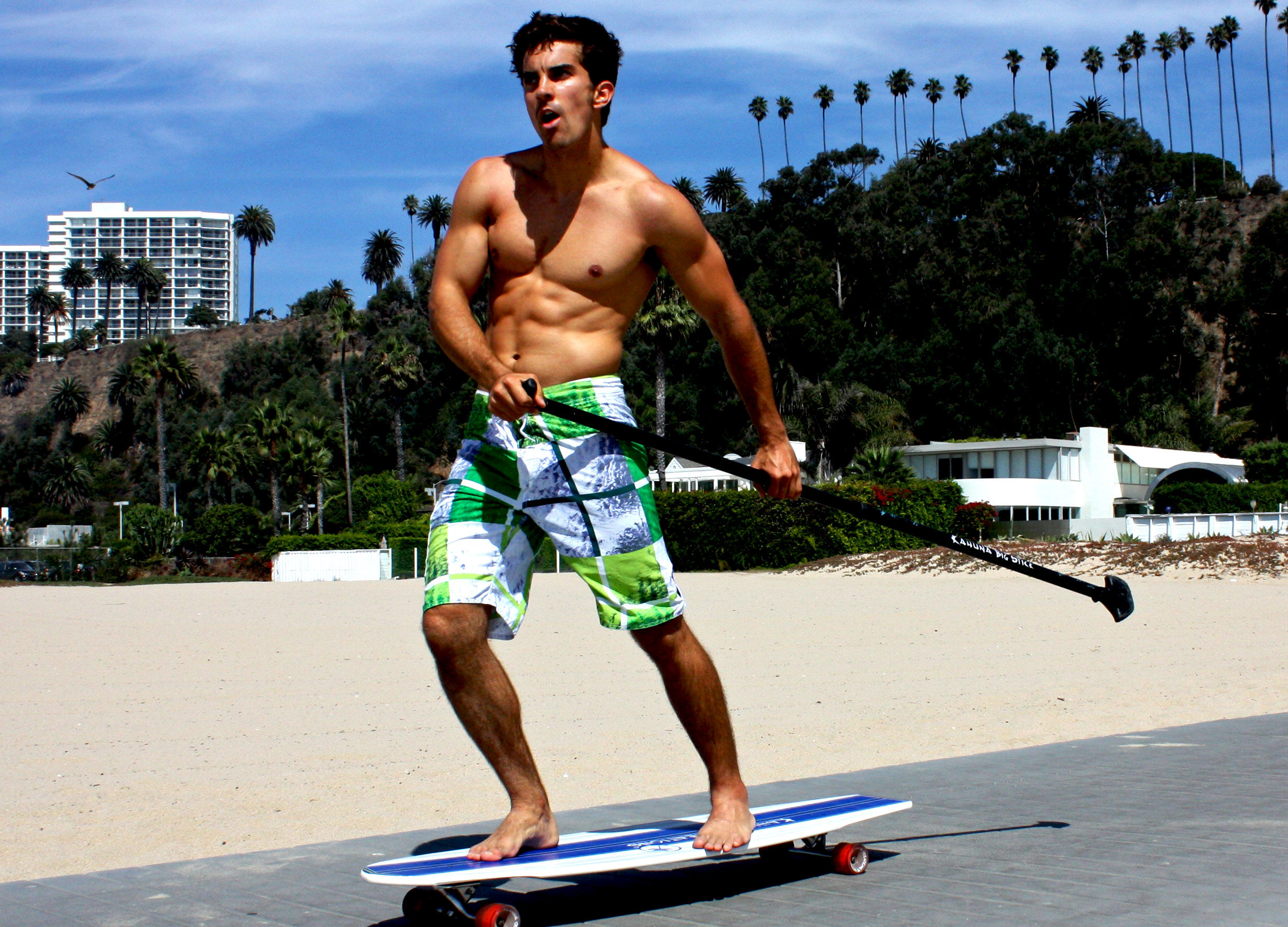
Land paddling

Land Paddling is the use of a long pole or stick while longboarding. The stick is used to propel the longboarder further without pumping. The stick also maintains balance and can be used as a brake. This variation was stated to be an invention by Steve McBride of Kahuna Creations, but this method of pushing has been around longer and can't be claimed by a single person.

=== Draft train ===
A draft train involves a group of riders riding in a straight line down a hill. The front rider breaks the wind drafting for the following riders, who in turn use their hands to push the rider immediately in front, increasing overall speed for the entire group. This technique requires skill and practice because riders are in such close proximity.

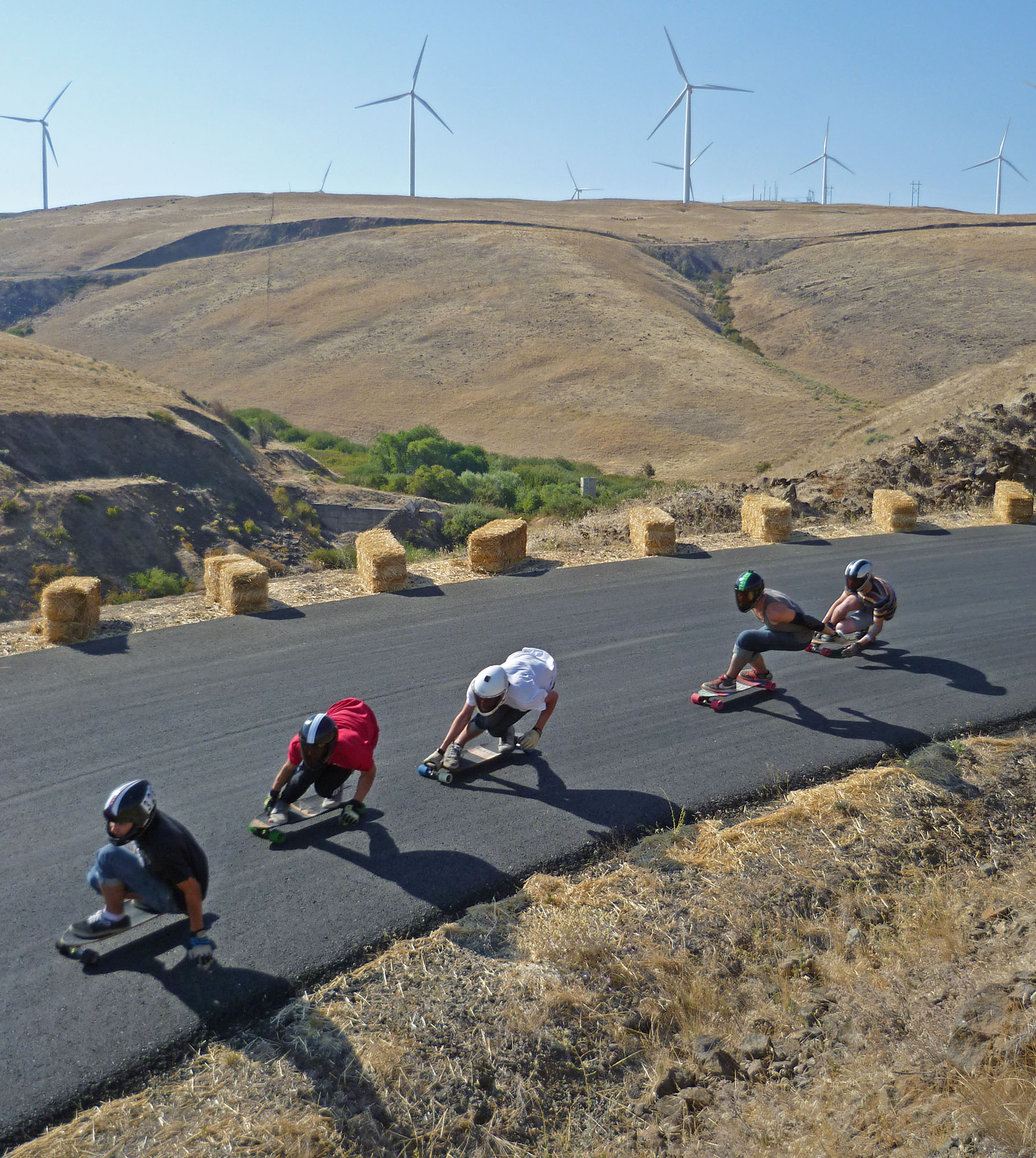
Downhill pack riding at Maryhill Loops Road, Washington

=== Drafting ===
Drafting is used by downhill riders to increase speed and pass other riders. It involves riding directly behind another rider to take advantage of the rider in front breaking the wind. A successful draft can greatly increase speed. The drafting rider waits until the last second to break from out behind the front rider to maximize the speed gained.

=== Tucks ===
==== American ====
In downhill, an American tuck involves the rider tucking their back knee right behind their front knee and leaning onto their front thigh. Many find this tuck to be one of the most comfortable to hold while providing for a very flat, aerodynamic back with a small frontal profile. This tuck results in larger draft pocket behind the rider, which is used in a race to pass.

==== Euro ====
A Euro tuck involves the rider tucking their back knee right behind their front ankle or calf and leaning their chest into the front thigh. This tuck gets the rider very low, but many find it to be uncomfortable and it creates a larger frontal profile which creates drag. It does reduce the draft pocket by guiding the air downwards due to the curved back.

==== Hybrid ====
A Hybrid tuck involves the rider tucking their back knee into the middle of their front calf. This tuck provides a balance between the Euro and American, taking some of the advantages and disadvantages of each.

==== Brazilian ====
A Brazilian tuck consists of the rider placing their back knee directly onto the board next to or behind the front foot. This Tuck has largely fallen out of favor for competitive riding. This is because it creates a very large frontal section that dramatically increases aerodynamic drag. It's mostly used by beginners or as a resting position for some people during very long runs.

==== Classic ====
A classic Tuck is one that was primarily used in the 1980s and 1990s. However some modern events, such as the MT Tabor Challenge in Portland Oregon, require this tuck to increase the difficulty on mellow hills. The tuck involves placing both feet at the front of the board, touching with one foot slightly behind the other. The rider then crouches down somewhat similar to a modern tuck. This tuck provides a severely reduced amount of control due to the rider having minimal control over the rear trucks. Further the stance has higher aerodynamic drag than other tucks.

== Braking techniques ==
Because of the high speed a longboard can achieve (as fast as a car), being able to brake quickly is extremely important.

=== Run out ===
While not an official braking technique, it is common for inexperienced riders to jump off the moving board and 'run out' their speed. This is safe only at low speeds. This technique, also known as "bailing", is considered dangerous and is least accepted in the longboarding community. If the rider is traveling faster than the speed at which they can run, other techniques are required, for example footbraking or sliding.

=== Sliding (braking) ===
Sliding is the most effective braking technique for downhill skateboarders. Sliding is the method of pushing the edge of the board out so it is traveling sideways rather than forwards, and the wheels are sliding against the ground. The resulting friction slows the board down dramatically. It allows a skater to reduce his or her speed much quicker than footbraking, but requires a wider area depending on their ability to control the slide. Factors such as the height and length of the board and, crucially, durometer (softness) of the wheels affect how easy this is to do and how fast the rider must be travelling to achieve effective slides. Sliding also requires an efficient and precise use of body weight in order to be fully effective.

=== Foot braking ===
Foot braking involves putting one foot on the road while balancing on the board with the other foot. The rider needs to put all of their weight on their front foot. This technique can be used to reduce speed or come to a full stop and it is a very helpful technique for an emergency case. This is helpful in racing or in tight situations where the rider does not feel comfortable sliding, or when a rider only needs to lose a small amount of speed prior to entering a turn. However this method can be wasteful and tends to destroy shoes as the sole of the shoe is worn away and doesn't shed speed nearly as fast as sliding.

==== Frog braking ====
A much less common form of foot braking is frog braking. This is where the rider grabs rail on both sides of the board and then stomps a foot down while crouched. This method allows the rider to shed speed much faster than a normal foot brake due to the rider being able to apply much greater pressure against the road. This method still does not slow the rider down as much as a slide and is considered 'odd' by most riders.

==== Sit braking ====
Another variation of foot braking is sit braking. This involves the rider going from a standing position to sitting on the board and putting both feet down. This method can slow the rider down very quickly. The downside to this method is that it takes some time to sit down on the board. This is usually used at the end of a run.

=== Air braking ===
Air braking involves standing upright on the board as tall as possible with arms outstretched to catch as much wind resistance as possible. In racing this is done by standing up from the rider's tuck. This is primarily done in downhill skateboarding to reduce speed before a tight turn. It is not meant to stop the rider, but rather slow the rider to maintain control and stability. The effect is most noticeable at higher speeds and can be enhanced by deploying a Sporting-Sail, jacket or other article of clothing, forming a parachute.

== Safety ==
Longboarding has a different pattern of injuries than skateboarding does. Many longboarding injuries are sustained while going downhill, while very few skateboarding accidents happen while going downhill. In downhill racing the riders are required to wear certain protective gear unlike other uses of the longboard where a helmet and padding may be worn. Full closed helmet, pads on the rider's elbows, knees, and wrist, gloves, slide pucks, and a leather suit are required. This equipment is mandated by the International Downhill Federation. Longboarding injuries tend to involve head and neck areas more than skateboarding injuries, which are more likely to involve a skater's lower extremities. Helmets, padding, and possibly friendly or parental supervision are highly recommended or enforced by law.

Scholars Glenn Keays and Alex Dumas found media reports of five longboard-related deaths in Canada and the United States during 2012, and four in 2013. A number of municipalities—most notably Vancouver—have considered banning or restricting longboarding, expressing concern with the speeds longboarders can reach.

== See also ==
- Freeboard
- Broadway Bomb, a longboarding race held in New York City
