= Longboard =

A longboard generally designates a longer board variant in various board sports.

- Longboard (skateboard)
- Longboard (surfing)

Longboard may also refer to

- Long spine board, a piece of pre-hospital emergency medical equipment

== See also ==
- Longboarding
- Longobard, an Anglicization of Lombard
