= Sporting-Sails =

- Company type: Private Company
- Industry: Retail - Action Sports
- Genre: Action sports and outdoor gear
- Founded: 2006
- Founders: Nick & Billy Smith
- Headquarters: Mill Valley, CA, United States
- Area served: Worldwide
- Parent: Sukrafte, LLC (Surf + Skate = Sukrafte)
- Website: www.sporting-sails.com

Sporting-Sails is an outdoor product company specializing in equipment lines catered towards skateboarders, mountaineers, skiers, longboarders, snowboarders, surfers, and endurance athletes. Sporting-Sails is headquartered in Mill Valley, California. The company is a member of One Percent for the Planet international organization, founded by Yvon Chouinard. At least one percent of sales are donated to non-profit, non-governmental social welfare programs such as Surfrider Foundation and Save the Waves Coalition.
