= David Cornthwaite =

Dave Cornthwaite
- Born: David Cornthwaite
- Education: Stamford School, University of Swansea
- Occupations: Adventurer; Explorer; Motivational speaker Author
- Spouse: Em Karembo Taylor (m. 2018)
- Website: davecornthwaite.com

David "Dave" Cornthwaite (born 1979) is an English adventurer, writer and filmmaker. He is best known for his Expedition1000 project, a plan to undertake 25 separate journeys of 1000 miles or more, each using a different form of non-motorised transport.

== Early life and education ==
Cornthwaite was born in England and attended Duke of Kent School in Surrey and then Stamford School in Lincolnshire. After finishing his high school education, he travelled to Uganda as a volunteer in a gap year teaching scheme organised by Africa & Asia Venture. Cornthwaite called this "his first taste of adventure".

== BoardFree ==
In May and June 2006, Cornthwaite skateboarded along Britain's End-to-end route from John O' Groats to Lands End, a distance of 1,442 kilometres (896 mi). The journey took 34 days. Three rest days were required when Cornthwaite developed severe blisters. On 2 June 2006, Cornthwaite completed the journey, becoming the first person to do so on a skateboard. This journey and another in Australia were made in association with charities including The Lowe Syndrome Trust, Link Community Development and Sailability Australia.

== Expedition1000 ==
Expedition1000 is Cornthwaite's 12-year career project to make twenty-five journeys of 1,000 miles (1,600 km) or more, each using a different form of non-motorised transport.

From 3 to 16 April 2011, Cornthwaite and Sebastian Terry journeyed 1,400 miles (2,300 km) from Vancouver, British Columbia, Canada, to Las Vegas by tandem bicycle. Neither had previously ridden a tandem bike.

On 19 June 2011, Cornthwaite began a 2,340-mile (3,770 km), Guinness World Record-setting journey down the Mississippi River from source to sea on a stand up paddleboard. The journey started at Elk Lake, just south of Lake Itasca, in Minnesota. The descent of the Mississippi River took 68 days including passage through falls, dams and locks. Hurricane Lee caused Cornthwaite to leave the water for a time, lengthening the trip to a total of 82 days. Cornthwaite carried all of his provisions by securing them in waterproof bags strapped to the deck of his paddleboard. Cornthwaite's speed depended on that of the current. The greatest distance covered in one day was 77 miles (124 km), just upstream of St. Louis.

In March 2012, in a fifth adventure for Expedition1000, Cornthwaite and a crew of ten sailed from Cabo San Lucas, Mexico, to Honolulu, Hawaii. The 3,156-mile (5,079 km) journey took 17 days. During this time, Cornthwaite and Emily Penn (the program director of Pangaea Explorations) conducted a series of workshops on topics ranging from ocean science to social media to diagnosis of personal happiness and purpose.

During August and September 2012, Cornthwaite swam 1,001 miles (1,611 km) down the Missouri River, from Chamberlain, South Dakota towards St. Louis, Missouri. He had a support crew of six but pulled his provisions along behind him on a raft. The swim raised funds for CoppaFeel!, a breast cancer awareness organization.

== Other expeditions ==
In April 2010, Cornthwaite and Sebastian Terry became the first people to cross Lake Geneva on stand up paddleboards. They made the 54-mile (87 km) journey in less than two days. Cornthwaite produced a documentary DVD of the expedition entitled Lake Geneva Crossing.

In June 2010, Cornthwaite and Sarah Outen paddled 150 miles (240 km) from Bath to beneath the Tower Bridge in London. The five-day journey, which finished on 8 June 2010, World Oceans Day, was a celebration of Britain's inland waterways.

== Writing ==
Cornthwaite writes about his journeys in a personal blog, in freelance magazine contributions and books. Cornthwaite's first book, based on his world-record-breaking skate across Australia was published in 2008. It was entitled BoardFree: The Story of an Incredible Skateboard Journey Across Australia. In 2008, Cornthwaite wrote a book about dating entitled Date: Confessions of a Temporary Serial Dater.

== Other work ==
Cornthwaite works as a motivational speaker at corporations, schools and other organizations. In 2011, Cornthwaite gave a speech for the TEDx Youth event in Bath.

Cornthwaite makes documentaries about his expeditions and those of other British adventurers. Cornthwaite is an ambassador for The Blue Project, a climate and oceans project that brings together elite sports men and women to promote sport, healthy living and a clean environment.

== Personal life ==
Cornthwaite married fellow adventurer and expedition leader Emma Karembo Taylor in September 2018.

== See also ==
- Sarah Outen, British adventurer and world record breaker
- Greg Foot, British science TV presenter
- Bear Grylls, British adventurer
- Bruce Parry, British adventurer and TV presenter
- Ray Mears, English survival expert and TV presenter
- Cas and Jonesy, Australian adventurers
- Sean Conway, British adventurer
- Alastair Humphreys, British adventurer
