= Pump (skateboarding) =

Skateboarding technique

Pumping is a skateboarding technique used to accelerate without the rider's feet leaving the board. Pumping can be done by turning or on a transition, like a ramp or quarter pipe. When applied to longboards, it is also known as long distance skateboard pumping or LDP. Pumping is a technique similar to pumping a surfboard.

== Transition ==
Transition pumping can only be done when there is a slope differential between the front and rear wheels. On a ramp it therefore is only possible at the top and bottom of the slope, but in a pipe it is possible at any height above the flat. The rider should push downward on the truck with the greatest slope under the wheels. On the top of a ramp the front wheels should be pushed, and at the bottom the rear trucks should be pushed. On a pipe the weight should be applied to the rear truck throughout the entire transition.

== Slalom ==
Flatland pumping is essentially carving with the proper amount of weight application in order to gain momentum. It involves shifting weight in sync with the board's movements in order to gain momentum, like pivoting, but with all four wheels on the ground. By proper timing, the proper foot position, and the proper set up, impressive results can be achieved.

== Long distance pumping ==
Long distance pumping (LDP), is the name given to skateboard pumping for any sustained distance (Slalom by contrast is through cones and usually a short distance, maybe 100 cones 6–12 ft separation).

LDP riders have been breaking world distance records for 24-hour skating, using a combination of pushing and pumping. Recent records include James Peters' 208 mile ride in May 2008, Barefoot Ted McDonald's 242 mile ride on June 14, 2008 during the Ultraskate IV held in Seattle, Washington, and Andy Andras' 309 mile ride in 2016 at the Ultraskate on the Homestead–Miami Speedway. The current 24-hour record is held by Rick Pronk with 313 miles at the 2017 Dutch Ultraskate. The women's world record is held by Lena Meringdal with 264.4 miles, achieved at the 2024 Dutch Ultraskate

== See also ==
- Charitable distance skating
- Longboard (skateboard)
- Adrenalina Skateboard Marathon
