= Charitable distance skating =

Charitable distance skating refers to long-distance travel on a longboard or skateboard with an associated charitable fundraising effort.

Perhaps one of the most famous boards in the world, Elsa (a rollsrolls carbon longboard) has over 10,000 km under her wheels. Elsa was pushed from Perth to Brisbane between August 20, 2006, and January 22, 2007, by Dave Cornthwaite, of BoardFree, at a distance of 5,823 km, which broke American Jack Smith's previous distance record by 994 km. Cornthwaite was also the first person to skateboard the length of Britain, travelling from John o' Groats to Land's End between April 30, 2006, and June 2, 2006, a total distance of 895.9 miles (1,441.8 km).

During the same summer of 2006, four young Canadians pushed their way across the second longest land mass in the world. Beginning on the waterfront in Halifax, Nova Scotia, the Push for the Cure pushed more than 7,000 km to Vancouver, British Columbia. The journey took just over five months and raised more than $80,000 for the Canadian Breast Cancer Foundation.

Many other charitable longboard journeys have taken place, including Nat Halliday et al.'s skate of the length of New Zealand in 2007, Sam Benson's Beatswalkin' journey from Devon, England, to Barcelona, Spain, in 2007, and Ben Stiff's record-breaking length of Britain skate in 2008.

Long Treks on Skate Decks comprises Paul Kent, Aaron Enevoldsen and Adam Colton. In 2009, the group skated 2,400 km through South America, from Peru to Bolivia. In 2010, they completed yet another 2,000 km journey through Morocco, raising funds for Art à la Carte, a Canadian volunteer society that provides acute care cancer patients with a choice of art for their hospital rooms. The blogs from these skating teams and the video coverage of their epic trips on sites such as YouTube.

In 2010 SkateAcrossUSA formed a team led by Ari Mannis that skated almost 3,000 miles (4,800 km) from Oregon to New York, followed by a support vehicle, to raise money for at-risk youth. In 2012 they finished their second journey from Santa Cruz to San Diego, California, totaling over 550 miles (890 km) with no support.

Skate4Hope comprises members from Singapore. Skate4Hope completed a 120 km maiden round-island voyage in July 2010.

In 2013 Longboard Japan AKA Jack Courtenay pushed his way solo with no support over 1569 km across Japan from Sapporo to Hiroshima in 33 days and raised $1000 for orphans in Japan that were effected by the 2011 Tōhoku earthquake and tsunami.

== See also ==
- Pump (skateboarding)
- Longboard (skateboard)
