= Broadway Bomb =

Longboarding race

- The logo of the race
- Date: The Third Saturday of October at 12:00pm
- Location: 116th Street and Broadway, New York, United States
- Event type: Longboarding street race
- Distance: 8.1 miles (13.0 km)
- Established: 2002
- Website: www.broadwaybomb.org

The Broadway Bomb is a longboarding race held every year along the length of Broadway in Manhattan. The event was founded in October 2002 by Ian Nichols and Fred Mahe with an initial set of sixteen competitors. After growing in size every year, by 2018 more than 700 riders competed.

When participation reached thousands of riders in 2012, the New York Supreme Court granted an injunction declaring the race unlawful. Since that time the New York City Police Department has deployed in force to prevent or disrupt the event.

== Overview ==
The race was founded in 2002 by two local longboarding enthusiasts - Ian Nichols and Fred Mahe - as a more challenging alternative to another longboarding event, the Central Park Race.

The inaugural Bomb took place with sixteen riders. By 2012, the event had grown to include over 2,000 thousand competitors/participants on the streets of Manhattan.

The race's growing popularity drew concern from city law enforcement. In 2012, organizer Ian Nichols cancelled and disassociated himself from the race, facing a formal injunction from Justice George Miller of the New York Supreme Court.

The website for a short time posted: 1.) Pursuant to Court order, the Broadway Bomb race and flash mob will not occur on October 20, 2012. 2.) Participants in any such event will be subject to arrest.

Despite the official cancellation in 2012 and with active NYPD opposition, the race has gone ahead every year without further incident while seeing even greater attendance and international interest.

== Rules ==
Always held on the 3rd Saturday in October, the race begins at noon, beginning at the intersection of 116th St and Riverside Drive in Upper Manhattan. The route closely follows Broadway and concludes eight miles later at the Charging Bull sculpture in Lower Manhattan.

The rules as defined on the official website are:

- Broadway Bomb is ALWAYS FREE
- Wear a helmet
- No skitching
- No knocking other riders off their boards
- No knocking down pedestrians
- Stay on Broadway as much as possible

The rule forbidding skitching - the use of motor vehicles to gain extra speed - led to disqualification of the apparent winner Adam Crigler in 2010. Adam maintains that the rule was added after the race was over and claims that other contestants that admitted skitching in the same race were not disqualified, thus he is the rightful winner of the 2010 Broadway Bomb.

== Participants and Winners ==
Official participation numbers are not recorded and vary according to sources. An indication of popularity can be gauged by the number of registrants on the unofficial contest calendar maintained by the Northern California Downhill Skateboarding Association.

Year	Men's Winner	Women's Winner	Participation	PEV Winner	Details
2002	Aussi Richard		14-20		Winning time of 38 minutes
2009	Mark Schaperow	Sara Paulshock	38		
2010	Adam Crigler (Disputed)	Sara Paulshock	423		
2011	Kiefer Dixon		1256		
2012	Kiefer Dixon		1937		Despite police activity, attendance was reported as high as 1,500.
2013	Kiefer Dixon				
2014	Kiefer Dixon				
2015	Kiefer Dixon				
2016	Kiefer Dixon				
2017	Kiefer Dixon				
2018	Kiefer Dixon				
2019	Kiefer Dixon	Emily Williams		Tarzan	The first year that Personal electric vehicles were officially allowed to participate. Tarzan Riding: Leaperkim/Veteran - Sherman, 100v
2020	Titus Lazare	Emily Williams		Krzysztof Iwinski	Krzysztof Iwinski's Time: 15:40 - Gotway - MSX, 100v
2021	Kiefer Dixon	Cami Best		Krzysztof Iwinski	Announced that winners can only be wearing helmets for all following years. Numerous helmet-wearing women's winners were also chosen. Krzysztof Iwinski's time: 15:18 - Leaperkim/Veteran - Sherman, 100v
2022	Daniel Lindsey	Mandy Bilbao		Krzysztof Iwinski	Daniel Lindsey's time was 29:34 Krzysztof Iwinski *eBWB record time* 14:43 - Leaperkim - Sherman, 100v
2023	Daniel Lindsey	Mandy Bilbao		William Knox	William Knox's time: 17:06 - Extreme Bull - Commander HS, 100v
2024	Adam Ornelles	Jhanaiya Smith-Butler		William Knox	William Knox's time 16:36 - Begode - Blitz, 134v
2025	Bryce Pabon -MassOGx				Julian Grzegorzewski Time: 16:07 - Veteran/leaperkim - Sherman S, 100v Major agreed upon detour, to avoid "no Kings Day" protests from 54th st to 38th st.
2026	Bryce Pabon -MassOGx	Mandy Bilbao			

== Police action and arrests ==
Since 2012, the race has been formally outlawed and actively obstructed by the NYPD.

=== 2012 ===
Ian Nichols was served with an Injunction and the race was declared unlawful. A major police presence prevented the competitors from massing at the start line. Orange crowd control nets were deployed at intersections along Broadway to trap and divert riders from the main route. Police vehicles and scooters were used as barriers.

Despite the significant deployment by the NYPD, only a handful of arrests were made.

=== 2013 ===
As in the previous year, police deployed orange nets to trap and obstruct participants. Among the police forces arrayed at the starting line were a number of NYPD mounted police.

Police officers near the starting line distributed leaflets to riders, describing the legal consequences of participation.

News outlets reported that up to 38 arrests and summonses were issued to individuals, with some of those detained as young as thirteen. Arrests along the route were concentrated at the starting line, around 105th St and at Columbus Circle.

There was at least one claim of assault against a participant by NYPD officers, and one report of a rider being Tasered.

=== 2016 ===
In 2016 there was no significant police presence.

=== 2017 ===
In 2017 police presence was significantly greater but no known arrest happened.

=== 2019 ===
In 2019 there was no significant police presence.

== Video documentary ==
In 2003 Nick Catania and Steve Dempsey produced a 26 minute documentary about the second full run of the Broadway Bomb. They staged camera operators at the start, finish and significant points along the course of the race. Nick also rode on the back of a scooter to film along with different riders throughout the race. The video is available on YouTube.

In the 2010 Broadway Bomb, Robin McGuirk recorded a first-person video of his seventh-place performance, making it available on the video sharing site Vimeo.

In 2011, Joe Goodman produced the documentary Push Culture - The Broadway Bomb, describing the history of the race and examining longboard culture in New York City. The film is available on Vimeo.

In 2013, 3rd-place winner Miles Evans recorded a first-person video of his ride, making it available on youtube.

In 2023 Gonzo, a documentary filmmaker, made a short documentary around the event and has been screened at the Kansas City Film Festival International and the New York Istanbul Film Fest. IMDB Page

== Inaugural race announcement ==
The inaugural broadway bomb was announced on September 30, 2002, on the Northern California Downhill Skateboarding Association's forum by Ian Nichols. He wrote

broadway bomb race in New York City.

This is a serious race for longboarders who are EXPERIENCED in riding in vehicular and pedestrian traffic. The race is on Saturday October 19th at 12 noon. We will meet at 110th street and Broadway. We will start soon after 12 and race down Broadway 7 miles through cars, trucks and people. The finish line is Bowling Green Park at the tip of Manhattan where Broadway starts. There is a statue of a bull at the northern end of Bowling Green and the first rider to touch the bull wins! I cannot stress the danger of this race enough. I have been riding in NYC for 25 years and yet was hit by a car just last week. There are prizes and a party after the race. There are no entrance fees for this race.

I cannot be responsible for the safety of riders. Please do not enter this race unless you are very experienced riding in traffic. I suggest riders wear protective equipment, especially helmets.

== Controversies ==
Over the years, the Broadway Bomb has been subject of some controversy. In 2012 NY declared the race "Unlawful". In 2014, skater Jimmy Soladay tried to steal the rights to the trademark by fraudulently claiming to be the founder of the race as well as ownership of its name and logo. Nichols filed a Notice to Oppose and the Court ruled in his favor as being the rightful owner. Nichols has since obtained the trademark as well as forming Broadway Bomb, LLC & New York Longboard Group, LLC that same year. However, the ruling by the Court could not stop Soladay from continually trying to profit from the race by manufacturing and distributing counterfeit athletic apparel with Broadway Bomb name and logo as well as selling tickets and registration entry forms. He has also tried to control the flow of information by boxing Nichols out of most of the Broadway Bomb social media accounts. These accounts are generally not respected by the longboarding community. In 2021, Soladay would continue to try and disrupt things by introducing an alternate skate route as well as claiming that, with the help of the NYPD, the race was now "officially sanctioned by the City". While NYPD had a minimal presence at the event, registration was not enforced, the route was not changed and traffic was not stopped. He has also falsely claimed sponsorship by Olympic Skateboarding. This also has involved Soladey purchasing the Olympic Skateboarding domain himself as well as broadwaybomb.nyc to confuse things even further. Soladay also has numerous Instagram accounts which he uses to boost engagement on his account. These accounts include @olympicskateboarding, @rockawayclassic, @skatersover40, @newyorkcityskaters, @rockawaysurfclub, and @usalongboardteam. All of which are characterized by having the same 3 posts, and approximately the same number of followers.

== See also ==
- Longboarding
- Skateboarding
- Skateboarding at the Summer Olympics
