= Adrenalina Skateboard Marathon =

Series of international longboard racing events

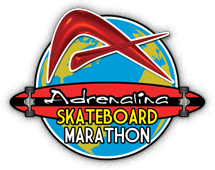
Adrenalina Skateboard Marathon logo.

The Adrenalina Skateboard Marathon was a series of international longboard racing events held from 2010 through 2017. Each race was on a 42.195-kilometre (26.219 mi) course on a skateboard that must be pushed by foot. The event was owned and operated by Adrenalina / Nata Media Inc.

== History ==
The first Adrenalina Skateboard Marathon took place on November 6, 2010, at Gulfstream Park in Hallandale Beach, Florida. One hundred and twenty-five people participated in the event and there were three hundred people total in attendance. A large international field was drawn, due to the fact it was the largest prize purse to date, including a ten thousand dollar grand prize. Jeff Vyain was the first winner of the event. He set a world record with a time of 1:40:58.

From 2012 to 2017 it was held in San Diego, California.

A long-term goal for the race was to create awareness and a perception that longboard skateboarding can be used as a viable and legal alternative mode of transportation.

Committed to not only fitness and endurance, the Adrenalina Skateboard Marathon also supported the community. A portion of each registration fee was to be donated to Summit4StemCell.

Summit4StemCell (S4SC) is a grass roots, volunteer fund raising organization supporting non-embryonic stem cell research conducted by Jeanne Loring Ph.D. and Melissa Houser, M.D. S4SC operates under the nonprofit status of the Parkinson's Association of San Diego (PASD). Summit4StemCell inspired a partnership with PASD, The Scripps Clinic in La Jolla and the Scripps Research Institute in an effort to further the fight against Parkinson's through this promising research.

== Results ==
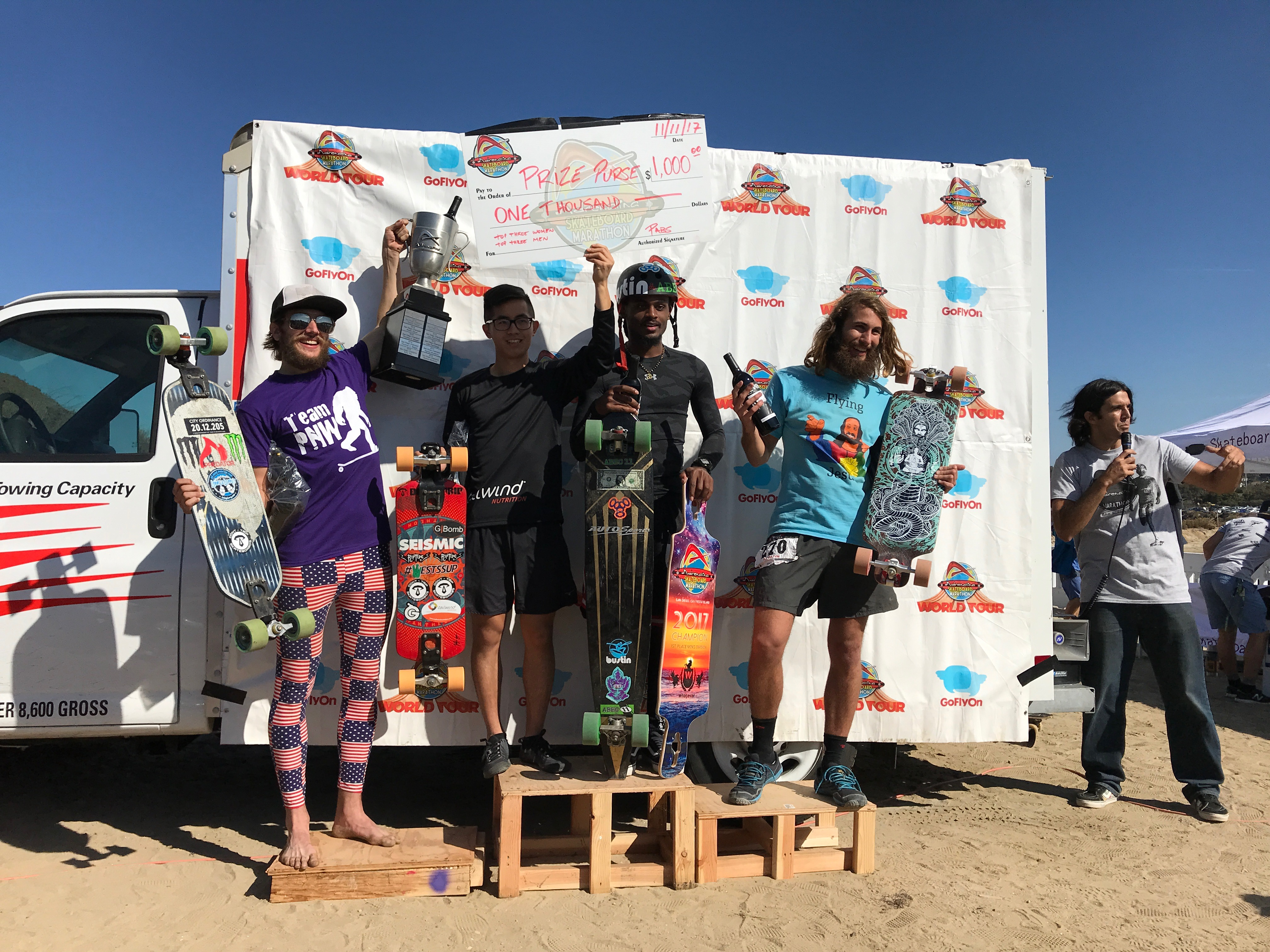
2017 Winners: Colby Cummings, Kyle Yan, Kiefer Dixon, and Eric Palmer

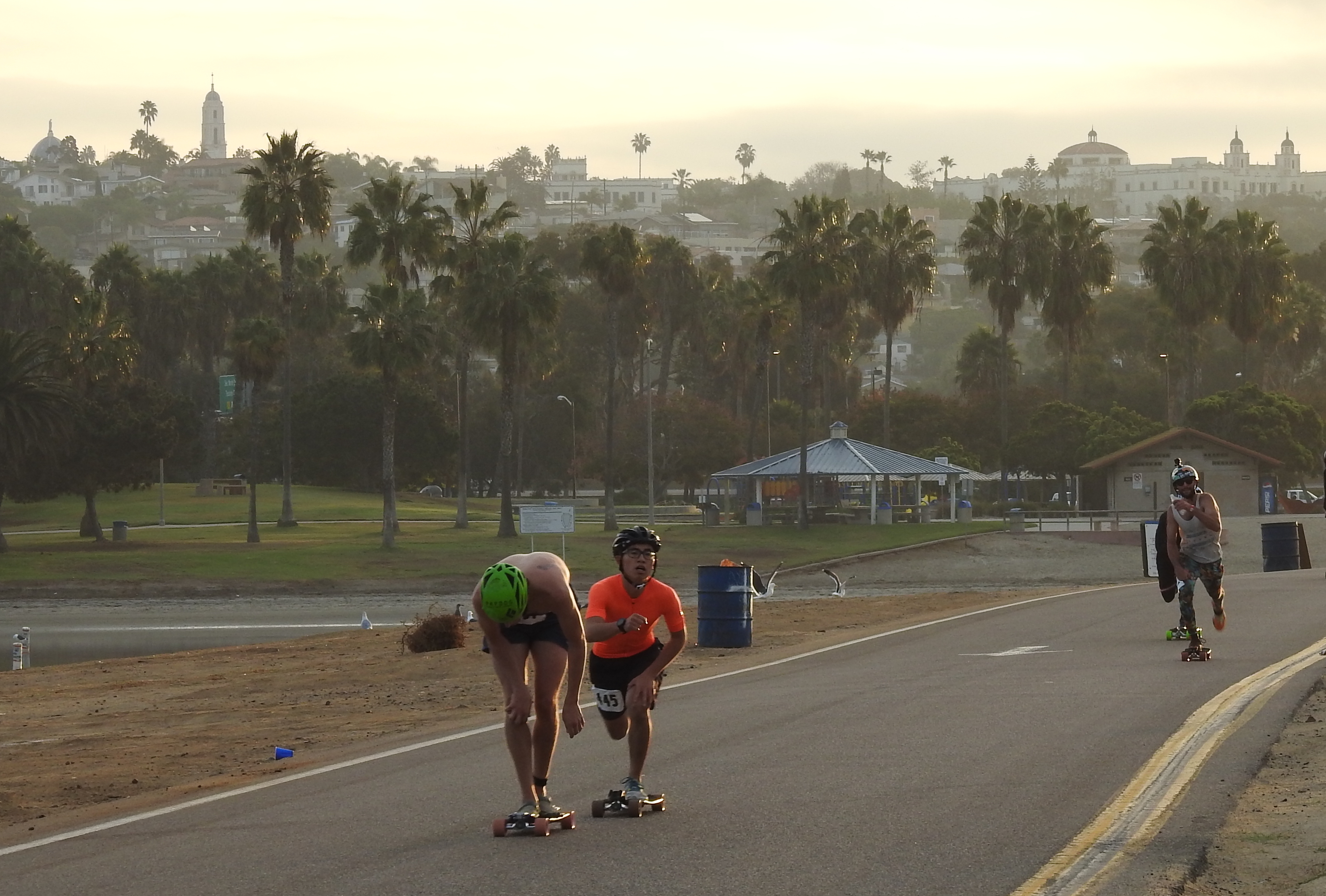
Jeff Vyain and Kyle Yan, 2017

Year	Location	Winners	Time
2017	San Diego, CA	Colby Cummings, Eric Palmer, Kiefer Dixon, Kyle Yan	1:37:37
		Alyssa Monteiro	2:01:22
2016	San Diego, CA	Kyle Yan, Jeff Vyain	1:33:30
		Alyssa Monteiro	1:55:56
2015	San Diego, CA	Thomas Slager	1:37:04
		Alyssa Monteiro	1:57:12
2014	San Diego, CA	Thomas Slager	?
		Lexi Hutchings	?
2013	San Diego, CA	Kiefer Dixon	?
		?	?
2012	San Diego, CA	Andrei Hippix	1:37:18
		Lexi Hutchings	1:57:23
2011	New York, NY	Jeff Vyain	1:31:41
		Cami Best	1:59:15
	Hallandale Beach, Florida	Jeff Vyain, Paul Kent	1:30:48
		Cami Best	1:59:30
	Plano, Texas	Paul Kent	1:38:42
		Sara Paulshock	2:06:24
	Puerto Rico	Kiefer Dixon	1:38:39
		Sara Paulshock	2:01:20
2010	Hallandale Beach, Florida	Jeff Vyain	1:40:58
		Sara Paulshock	2:12:24
