= Emily Penn =

Researcher and activist

Emily Penn is a Welsh skipper and ocean-advocate. She is known for the founding of eXXpedition, a not-for-profit organization which hosts research expeditions at sea with all-women crews to investigate ocean pollution.

== Early life ==
Penn was born in Swansea and grew up in Penarth. Penn graduated from University of Cambridge in 2008 with a Bachelor of Arts in Architecture. In 2008, Penn joined the speedboat Earthrace for an extended voyage from the United Kingdom to Australia, where she planned to work as an architect.

== Career ==
In 2010, Penn co-founded Pangaea Explorations which used a 72-foot yacht to bring scientists, researchers, and filmmakers to remote areas. In 2014, Penn co-founded eXXpedition with Lucy Gilliam. The organization hosts research expeditions at sea with all-women crews, with the intention of advancing the general understanding of microplastics in the ocean. In 2014, Penn tested her own blood for 35 toxic chemicals that have been banned by the United Nations, and found 29 of them in her blood, a topic that Penn spoke with on the TED Radio Hour.

Penn led the 2019-2020 'Round the World' expedition that had to end early due to the COVID-19 pandemic. That same year, she established the digital SHiFT platform in 2020 to provide people with ideas on ways to reduce ocean pollution.

== In media ==
A 2018 eXXpedition voyage led by Penn is the subject of Eleanor Church's documentary film X Trillion, which premiered in 2024.

== Honors and awards ==
Penn was named Yachtmaster of the Year in at the London International Boat Show in 2010, an award presented by HRH The Princess Royal. She received the Fitzroy Award at the 2016 Ocean Awards, an award given to "the adventurer or explorer who achieved the most to further ocean conservation in the past 12 months". In 2021, she was awarded the British Empire Medal in the Queen's New Year's Honours "for [her] services to conservation and charity". In 2022, Penn was named one of PEOPLE's Women Changing the World in 2022 for her work in ocean advocacy. She also received an honorary Doctorate of Science from the University of Exeter in 2022.
