= Link Community Development =

Link Community Development International
- Abbreviation: Link
- Formation: 1989
- Type: NGO Charity
- Purpose: Improving the quality of education in Africa
- Region served: 4 countries in Sub-Saharan Africa
- CEO: Mrs Fiona Greig
- Website: www.lcdinternational.org

Link Community Development International (Link) is an international NGO working to improve the quality of education in Africa. Since 1992 the organization has improved the lives of 1.7 million children in over 3,000 schools in Ghana, Ethiopia, Malawi, Uganda, and South Africa.

== History ==
Link was founded in 1989 as Link Africa by students of Cambridge University who actively supported Black Education in South Africa. Due to the educational departments restructuring after the end of apartheid in 1994, Link shifted its focus from placement work to government; aiming to support the new integrated Department of Education. During this time Link Africa became Link Community Development. Link continues to expand and is now a leading specialist NGO in whole district school interventions. The Most Revd Desmond Tutu was the Patron of Link.

== Vision ==
Link’s vision is a world where every child has the right to quality education.

== Mission ==
Link's mission is to inspire sustainable innovations in national education policy using grassroots approaches to improve accountability and learner outcomes.

== Morocco/Croatia Hitch ==
The Morocco/Croatia Hitch was Link’s biggest fundraiser and the world's largest organised hitchhiking event. It occurred every Easter holiday with students from universities across the UK taking part. It began in 1992, with Prague being added in 2003. This second destination was changed to Croatia for the 2012 event. More than 8,500 people have taken part in the Hitch since it started, raising at least £4.5million. The final Hitch took place in 2016.
