= Jeanne Loring =

American biologist

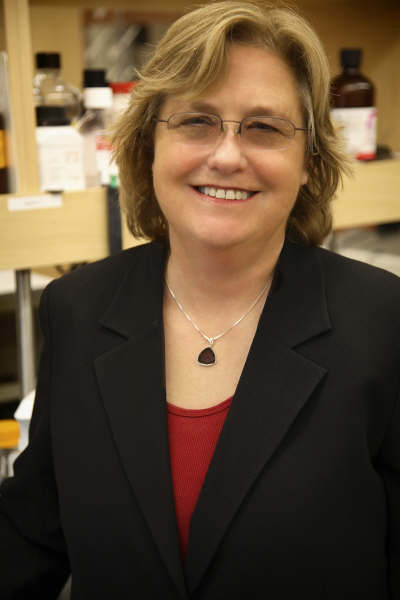
Jeanne Loring

Jeanne Frances Loring (born May 4, 1950) is an American stem cell biologist, developmental neurobiologist, geneticist, and ethicist. She was the founding Director of the Center for Regenerative Medicine and currently Professor emerita at the Scripps Research Institute in La Jolla, California. She has founded two biotechnology companies, Arcos BioScience (1999) and Aspen Neuroscience (2018)

== Education and early life ==
Loring was born in Tucson, Arizona, to William and Elizabeth Loring. She has one sister, Anne Loring, who is a linguist and attorney. Her father earned his Ph.D. in geology from the University of Arizona when Anne and Jeanne were children, and his jobs as a uranium and copper prospector required that the family move frequently. Jeanne started first grade in a temporary two-room schoolhouse in La Sal, Utah, growing up in mining towns in Arizona, Colorado, Utah, New Mexico, and Wyoming and never living in one place for more than 5 years. Bill Loring was an intellectual, reading philosophy and writing poetry, and at home he filled in the gaps of her small-town education. She attended high school in Salt Lake City, Utah, Vanadium, New Mexico, and Casper, Wyoming. In 1968, she was awarded a National Merit Scholarship, which allowed her to attend the University of Washington in Seattle, where she completed a bachelor of science degree in 3 1/2 years, graduating magna cum laude in molecular biology in 1972 and elected to Phi Beta Kappa.

Loring was one of 500 students in the US awarded a National Science Foundation Graduate Fellowship and joined the newly established Institute for Molecular Biology at the University of Oregon in Eugene, where she became interested in stem cell development through her research on neural crest cells. She earned her Ph.D. in 1979 and began work as a visiting assistant professor at the University of California Davis.

== Career ==
After completing her doctoral work, Loring spent five years studying and lecturing on embryology and neurobiology as a faculty member at the University of California at Davis before moving to the biotechnology industry. As Staff Scientist at Hana Biologics (1987-1989), Loring worked on development of cell therapy for Parkinson's disease. She combined genomics and stem cell research as a Senior Scientist at GenPharm International (1989–1995), Senior Research Fellow at Molecular Dynamics (1995–1997), and Senior Director at Incyte Genomics (1997–2001). At GenPharm, Loring worked on gene editing in mouse embryonic stem cells, and created mouse models for human disease. She was the first to produce a transgenic mouse harboring a large human genomic sequence cloned in a yeast artificial chromosome (YAC) that retained regulatory elements of the human genes. At Incyte Genomics, she helped develop genomics and bioinformatics and applied them to understanding development of mouse embryonic stem cells. Loring founded Arcos Bioscience in 1997 in part to develop human embryonic stem cells and derived nine of the human embryonic stem cell preparations that were approved for federal funding by President George W. Bush in 2001.

The Wisconsin Alumni Foundation (WARF) was issued a composition of matter patent in 2001 that covered all human embryonic stem cells, and because of high patent licensing fees, Arcos decided to merge with another small company, Cythera, which then merged with another stem cell company, Bresagen. After another merger with Novocell, the company became Viacyte, which was acquired by Vertex in 2022 for its experience in development of stem cell-derived therapies for Type 1 Diabetes. The initiation in 2003 of federal funding for human embryonic stem cells made Dr. Loring eligible to receive National Institutes of Health funding, and she was awarded a grant to provide the first West coast training course for hESC research. Loring moved to academia, becoming the founding co-director of the Stem Cell Center at the Burnham Institute (now called the Sanford Burnham Prebys Medical Discovery Institute).

In 2006, Dr. Loring initiated a challenge of the WARF patents on hESCs with Dan Ravicher, who founded the Public Patent Foundation and John Simpson from Consumer Watchdog. In response, the US Patent Office rejected the patents, leading WARF to narrow its claims; the PTO reversed its ruling and allowed the modified patent. The modification meant that WARF's patent now covered only embryo-derived stem cells, and excluded induced pluripotent stem cells (iPSCs), an important victory for the stem cell field. In 2014, the Supreme Court declined to take up the case and the primary patent expired in 2015.

In 2007, Loring was recruited to The Scripps Research Institute, where she was the founding director of the Center for Regenerative Medicine and professor in the Department of Molecular Medicine. In 2019, she moved her lab and research projects to Aspen Neuroscience, a biotechnology company she founded in 2018 with Ashley Van Zeeland and her postdoctoral fellow, Andres Bratt-Leal. Aspen was founded to bring forward the translational research to clinical utility. She was Chief Scientific Officer at Aspen, and remains at Scripps as a professor emerita. She was also an adjunct professor in human genetics at Sanford Burnham Prebys Institute, an adjunct professor in the School of Public Health at San Diego State University, and a Research Fellow at the Zoological Society of San Diego.

Her research is currently focused on human pluripotent stem cells, a remarkable cell type made by reprogramming adult cells to an embryonic state, making them capable of developing into all of the cell types in the body. She has published over 200 peer-reviewed scientific articles, which have been cited more than 21,000 times. She holds 6 issued patents on transgenic methods, Alzheimer disease, and stem cells.

== Patient advocacy ==
Loring is an advocate for patient education and against stem cell tourism, and has frequently spoken out on these subjects including commentaries in ethics journals with bioethicist Mary Devereaux. She has also commented on the ethics of stem cell research in articles with ethicist Jonathan Moreno and pro-life advocate Christine Scheller. She often guest blogs on the stem cell blog, The Niche, describing her experiences, such as attending an FDA public meeting on Huntington's disease and Parkinson's disease. For her outspoken support of patients and advocacy of stem cell research she was awarded the Stem Cell Person of the Year award in 2015 and received the Stem Cell Action Advocacy Award in 2015 from the Genetics Policy Institute, which hosts the World Stem Cell Summit, and won a Stem Cell Pioneer award from Xconomy in 2019.

== Research areas ==
Genomics and epigenetics

A major theme of the research that Loring oversees is focused on the study of genomics and epigenetics of pluripotent stem cells, with the goal of ensuring their effectiveness and safety for cell therapy. Loring oversaw the development of PluriTest, an animal-free, molecular test of pluripotency that uses gene expression profiling to predict pluripotency of novel cell lines. The patent on PluriTest is licensed for microarrays to ThermoFisher and was assigned to Aspen Neuroscience in 2019. She has also done analysis of genomic integrity of cells in culture, and a comparative analysis the mutational loads of different reprogramming methods.

Parkinson's disease cell replacement therapy

Symptoms of Parkinson's disease are caused by the death of dopamine neurons in a part of the brain called the substantia nigra. Aspen Neuroscience is developing a dopamine neuron replacement therapy for Parkinson's disease. The project was launched in 2012 by funding by the patient advocacy group Summit For Stem Cell. The goal of the project is to produce autologous (patient-specific) dopaminergic neurons differentiated from induced pluripotent stem cells (iPSCs) for use as a cell replacement therapy. The approach of using autologous cells ensures that they will not be rejected after transplantation. The project is notable for the high level of community involvement, including fundraisers, lab tours, and community education.

Multiple sclerosis therapy development

Another project in Dr. Loring's lab is development based therapy for multiple sclerosis. In a collaboration with Tom Lane, a notable MS researcher, a type of human neural precursor cell derived from pluripotent stem cells restored motor function in a mouse model of MS. The transplanted cells do not permanently engraft within the mouse but the recovery process continues for several months before stabilizing. The goal of this research is to identify the mechanism by which the human cells induced recovery from paralysis in the mouse. This knowledge is to be used to develop a novel evidence-based therapy for MS.

Autism

Fragile X syndrome is a genetic form of autism, and Loring's laboratory is using iPSCs derived from Fragile X patients to understand the causes of the disease. The goal of this research is to understand how autism affects brain development. Because the project uses iPSCs that are developed into the neurons affected in autism, the work has the potential to lead to identification of drugs to treat Fragile X and autism.

The Stem Cell Zoo

Loring and her postdoctoral fellow, Inbar Friedrich Ben-Nun, were the first to report the generation of induced pluripotent stem cells from endangered species. IPSCs were generated from a primate, the drill Mandrillus leucophaeus and the nearly extinct northern white rhinoceros, Ceratotherium simum cottoni. There are only two northern white rhinos left in the world (2022), and the hope is that the iPSCs can be differentiated into sperm and egg cells to generate new animals. "If everything falls into place and everything works, there is a way to generate new animals," said Loring in an interview with Nature News. The project is a collaboration with The Frozen Zoo at the San Diego Zoo Institute for Conservation Research, which has collected and frozen samples from thousands of animals, including twelve northern white rhinos, in The Frozen Zoo. "It's really brilliant in retrospect that when animals die, you can freeze some of their cells and they'll last forever," said Loring. In December 2015, an expert meeting was convened in Vienna, Austria, "Conservation by cellular technologies" where a plan was devised to rescue the northern white rhino and their paper was published detailing this plan. The story of her involvement in this project was published in a special Nature Outlook edition in 2021.

Stem Cells in Space

Dr. Loring is involved in a project to study the effects of microgravity on neurons on the International Space Station (ISS). Supported by the National Stem Cell Foundation and in collaboration with the New York Stem Cell Foundation, the team has sent neural-glial organoids to the ISS on four missions: SpaceX CRS-18, CRS-19, CRS-24, and CRS-25. The neurons survived and thrived for 30 days on the ISS. Early analysis suggests that there are unexpected changes caused by microgravity. On CRS-25, Loring's own iPSC-derived neurons were sent to the ISS and returned in September 2022.

== Awards and honors ==
Loring has received many awards, including a Rosalind Franklin Society Science Award (2022), American Physiological Society Solomon Berson Distinguished Lectureship (2022), the 2019 Xconomy Stem Cell Pioneer award, the 2015 Stem Cell Action Advocacy Award, the 2015 Stem Cell Person of the Year, a Millipore Foundation Stem Cell Research Award, an Esther O'Keefe Foundation Award for Stem Cell Research, The Burnham Institute for Medical Research Leadership Award and the Marie and Jimmy Mayer Award for Melanoma Research. She was a National Merit Scholar (1968) and was awarded a National Science Foundation Predoctoral Fellowship. She is a member of Phi Beta Kappa, and was inducted as an American Institute for Medical and Biological Engineering (AIMBE) Fellow in 2021. In 2017, she was invited to join an international group of researchers working toward development of cell replacement therapies for Parkinson's disease, called G-Force PD.

== Personal life ==
Loring lives in Del Mar, California (2024) and is married to her lifelong partner and fellow scientist David L. Barker, former Chief Scientific Officer of the genomics biotechnology company Illumina, Inc (ILMN), founder of Singular Genomics (OMIC), and chair of the BOD of BioNano Genomics (BNGO). Loring and Barker enjoy traveling and often travel to wherever in the world has the best viewing of total solar eclipses. They've seen solar eclipses in 13 countries, including Libya, Zambia, Aruba, Easter Island, Bolivia, Russia, Turkey, Indonesia, the US, Australia, Mexico, Greenland. Loring has experienced 20 eclipses. Sixteen were total, in which the moon completely eclipsed the sun for up to 5 minutes, and 4 were annular, in which the moon covered all but the edges of the sun. She has logged a total time in the darkness of the totally eclipsed sun of more than 49 minutes; the total time during eclipses is 2 days, 2 hours.
