= City Mantis =

- Manufacturer: City Mantis USA
- Parent company: ADX USA Inc
- Production: 2002 - ?
- Successor: Mantis XP
- Class: Electric Scooter
- Engine: 2 x 12v Replaceable; Liquid-gel Batteries
- Top speed: 16 mph (26 kmh)
- Power: DC 36v / 300w
- Ignition type: Electronic Ignition
- Frame type: Aluminium Composite Hex Box
- Suspension: Front & Seat
- Brakes: Front Disc & and Rear Drum
- Tires: Front: 12 1/2 x 2 1/4; Rear: 2.80 x 4
- Weight: 20-22 kg (dry)

The City Mantis Electric Scooter (Also referred to as an Electric Bike) is a personal transporter developed by City Mantis USA. It is not clear when the City Mantis was first launched but its earliest appearance comes from a Cycle Show at the Business Design Centre in 2002. The original City Mantis model was known for its unique fold-up feature and was marketed for being conveniently stored or carried away after use. According to the official website, the City Mantis was voted "most innovative new product of 2003" at the time of its release.

== Design ==
The City Mantis combines elements of both a bike and an electric scooter. It uses an aluminium composite hex box frame with a distance range of 10 to 18 miles and a maximum speed of 16 mph (26 kmh). It consists of a small wheel at the rear of the scooter that is propelled by an electric motor, with a larger wheel for handling at the front. There are two fold-up foot pegs on either side of the rear wheel and uses 2 x 12v replaceable liquid gel batteries which are housed in the main body of the scooter. It weighs on average between 20 and 22 kg and can take a maximum load capacity of 35 kg. It has adjustable front and rear suspension and depending on the model, the Mantis can be folded-up in either one or two stages.

The City Mantis appears in: Metallic Silver, Black and Blue as well as Rosso Red, Neon Lime and Purple.

Side-view of the body of the Mantis XP. Note the word 'City' not used.

Rear-view of the Mantis XP with both pegs extended.

== Models ==
There are two distinct models of the City Mantis.

=== City Mantis ===
- Thumb-based throttle
- Rear drum brake
- On/Off switch connected to the throttle
- Cut-off switch when rear drum break is in use
- Unpatterned front and rear tyres
- Belt-driven electric motor
- Standard suspension system
- Plastic-based front wheel
- Two-stage fold-up

=== City Mantis XP ===
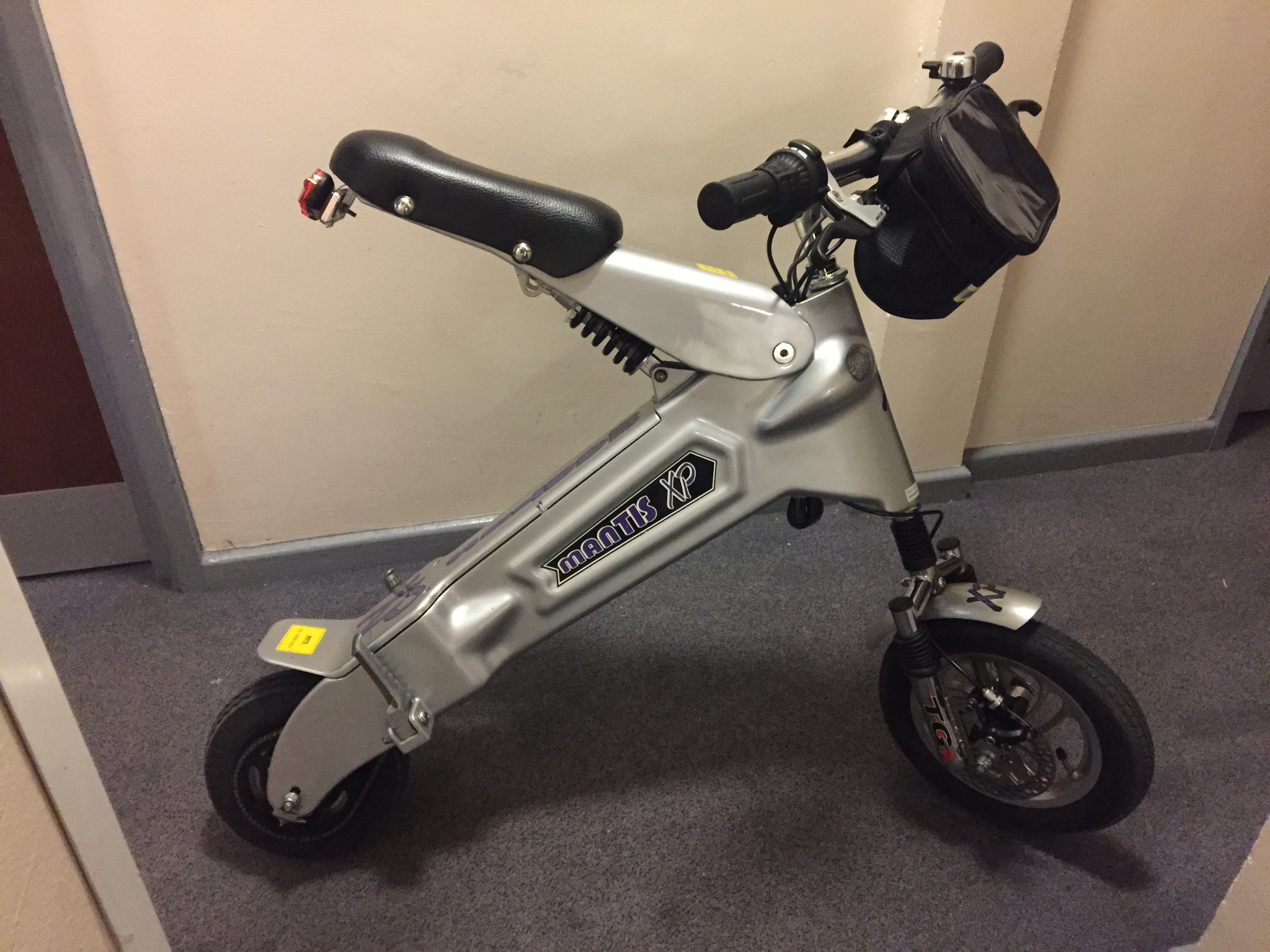
City Mantis XP scooter with handlebar bag and rear light

The City Mantis XP or simply Mantis XP as displayed on the scooter, includes more features than the standard model and the overall design has some significant changes. Features include:

- Twist-grip throttle
- Front disc brake and a rear drum brake
- Key ignition
- Chain-driven electric motor
- Larger front and rear tyre with patterned tread
- Alloy front and rear wheel
- Front wheel mudguard
- Auto switch-on front lights on ignition
- Upgraded suspension
- Larger body and battery compartment
- One stage fold-up

== Safety ==
Warning stickers as they appear on the City Mantis XP.

All City Mantis models have warning notifications that endorse the use of protective clothing and headgear when riding and to not exceed the maximum load capacity of 35 kg. Red and white reflectors are standard on the City Mantis while the Mantis XP includes only a rear red reflector due to the additional front lights.

The Mantis XP uses key ignition in order to ride the scooter.

== Shark XP ==
The Shark XP is a personal transporter marketed as an electric scooter/bicycle that is manufactured by the Guangdong Tayo Company in China. It uses various components that are visible on the Mantis XP however the main central body of this scooter is significantly much larger, reminiscent of a shark, hence the name.

Specifications:

- Dimension: 1000 x 600 x 950
- Motor: DC36v/300w
- Net weight (without batteries): 18 kg
- Net weight (with batteries): 26 kg
- Gross weight (with batteries): 31 kg
- Max. Load Capacity: 90 kg
- Max. Speed: 20 km/h
- Maximum Range: 22 km
- Battery: 12V/12Ahx3
- Tire Front: 12 1/2x2 1/4
- Tire Rear: 2.80x4
- Drive Mechanism: Chain system
- Front Brake: Mechanical disk brake
- Rear Brake: Band brake
- Charger time: 6-8 hr

== IKOO Transporter ==
The IKOO Transporter is a personal transporter that is produced and manufactured in the United States by IKOO. It bears a similar resemblance to the City Mantis but is produced using different materials and equipment. However, due to the uncanny resemblance, it has led some to consider the City Mantis an imitation of the IKOO Transporter and vice versa.

Specifications:

- Venoem™ 48V 750W
- T304 Stainless Steel Alloy
- Magnesium Composite
- PCM (Power Control Module)
- Li-ion 48V15Ah
- Regenerative Braking
- Cruise Control
- Hand stitched ergo seat
- Hi-density LED lights
- Hi-capacity battery charger
- Convenience Package: Includes spare key, alloy kickstand, quick release

== In Law ==
In 2008, Paul King was stopped by police whilst riding a City Mantis on the pavement. King was acquitted when the district Judge Parsons declared the City Mantis not a motor vehicle. Judge Parsons determined that no reasonable person would be of the view that the scooter was intended for use on the road but was passed to the High Court for definitive determination whether the electric scooter was a motor vehicle according to section 185 of the Road Traffic Act 1988. The Divisional Court of the Queen's Bench Division of the High Court ruled that the City Mantis, which was capable of speeds of 10 mph, was a motor vehicle. King was convicted of having no insurance or a helmet while riding the City Mantis.

== Other ==
The City Mantis name was trademarked in 2003 for electric scooters.
