= Personal transporter =

Ridable small motorised road vehicles

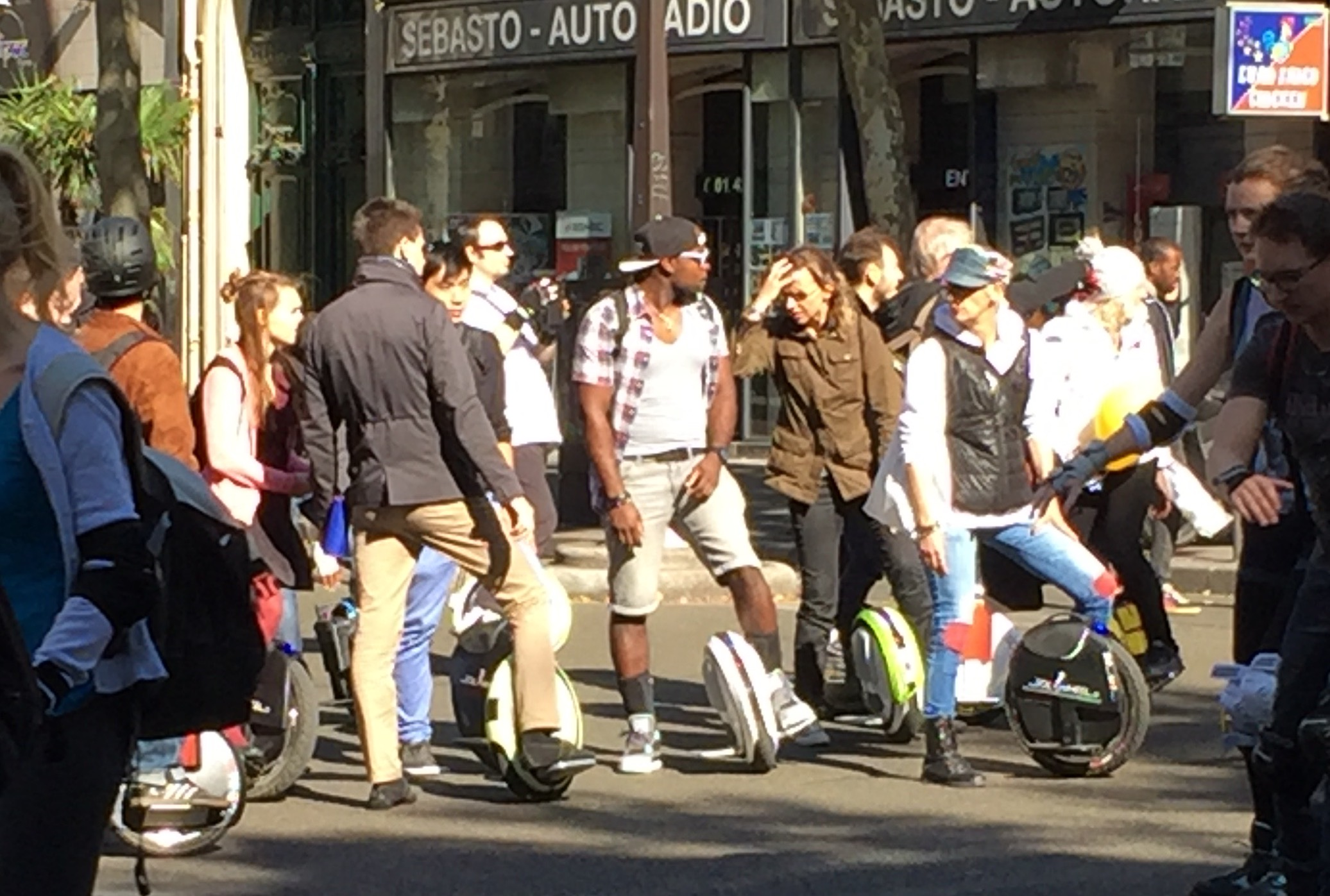
Self-balancing unicycles at 'Paris sans Voiture' (Paris without cars) in 2015

A personal transporter (also powered transporter, personal electric vehicle (PEV), personal mobility device, etc.) is any of a class of compact, mostly recent (21st century), motorised micromobility vehicle for transporting an individual at speeds that do not normally exceed 25 km/h (16 mph). They include electric skateboards, e-scooters, self-balancing unicycles, Segways, and motorised scooters. Many newer versions use recent advances in vehicle battery and motor-control technologies. They are growing in popularity, and legislators are in the process of determining how these devices should be classified, regulated and accommodated during a period of rapid innovation. Regulations concerning personal transporters vary by country.

Generally excluded from this legal category are electric bicycles (that are considered to be a type of bicycle); electric motorbikes and scooters (that are treated as a type of motorcycle or moped); and powered mobility aids with 3 or 4 wheels on which the rider sits (which fall within regulations covering powered mobility scooters).

== History ==
The first personal transporter was the Autoped, a stand-up scooter with a gasoline engine made from 1915 to 1922. Engine-powered scooters and skateboards reappeared in the 1970s and the 1980s. Twike and Sinclair C5 were 1980s enclosed hybrid velomobiles that also used pedal power.

With the rapid improvements in lithium batteries in the late 1990s and early 2000s, a range of new types of personal transporters appeared, and began to spread into use in urban settings for both recreation and practical transportation.

Dean Kamen applied for his first patent for a 'human transporter', the Segway PT, in 1994. This was followed by other patent applications prior to its product launch in late 2001 and first deliveries to customers early in 2002.

Trevor Blackwell demonstrated a self-balancing unicycle based on the control-mechanism from a Segway PT in 2004 for which he published open source designs (see Eunicycle). Focus Designs released the first commercially available self-balancing unicycle (which had a seat) in 2008 and in 2010 Shane Chen, an American businessman and founder of Inventist, filed a patent for the more familiar and compact seatless device which his company, Inventis launched in 2011.

Chen then went on to file a patent for a self-balancing scooter in February 2013, and launched a Kickstarter fund-raising campaign in May 2013 with multiple companies, mainly in China releasing similar products. 500,000 units from 10 suppliers were recalled from the US market alone in July 2016.

Louie Finkle of California is credited with creating the first commercial electric skateboards, offering his first wireless electric skateboard in 1997 and he filed for a patent in April 1999, though it was not until 2004 that electric motors and batteries had sufficient torque and efficiency to power boards effectively. In 2012 ZBoard raised nearly 30 times their target for a balance controlled electric skateboard on Kickstarter, which was well received at the Consumer Electronics Show in Las Vegas in January 2013.

In December 2016 The Verge magazine suggested that 2017 would be an "important year" for personal electric vehicles of all sizes. On 14 August 2018, a unicycle manufactured by InMotion caught fire in a British flat. About 1 week later, InMotion issued a statement to discourage customers from buying parallel imports. From 1 July 2019 onwards, Singapore enforces the fire safety standard known as "UL 2272" by banning the sales of non-certified products, and by publishing a list of legal products.

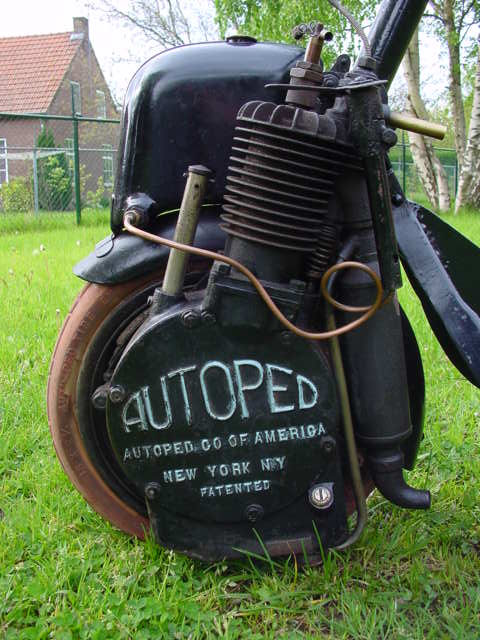
Engine of an Autoped, made 1915–1922

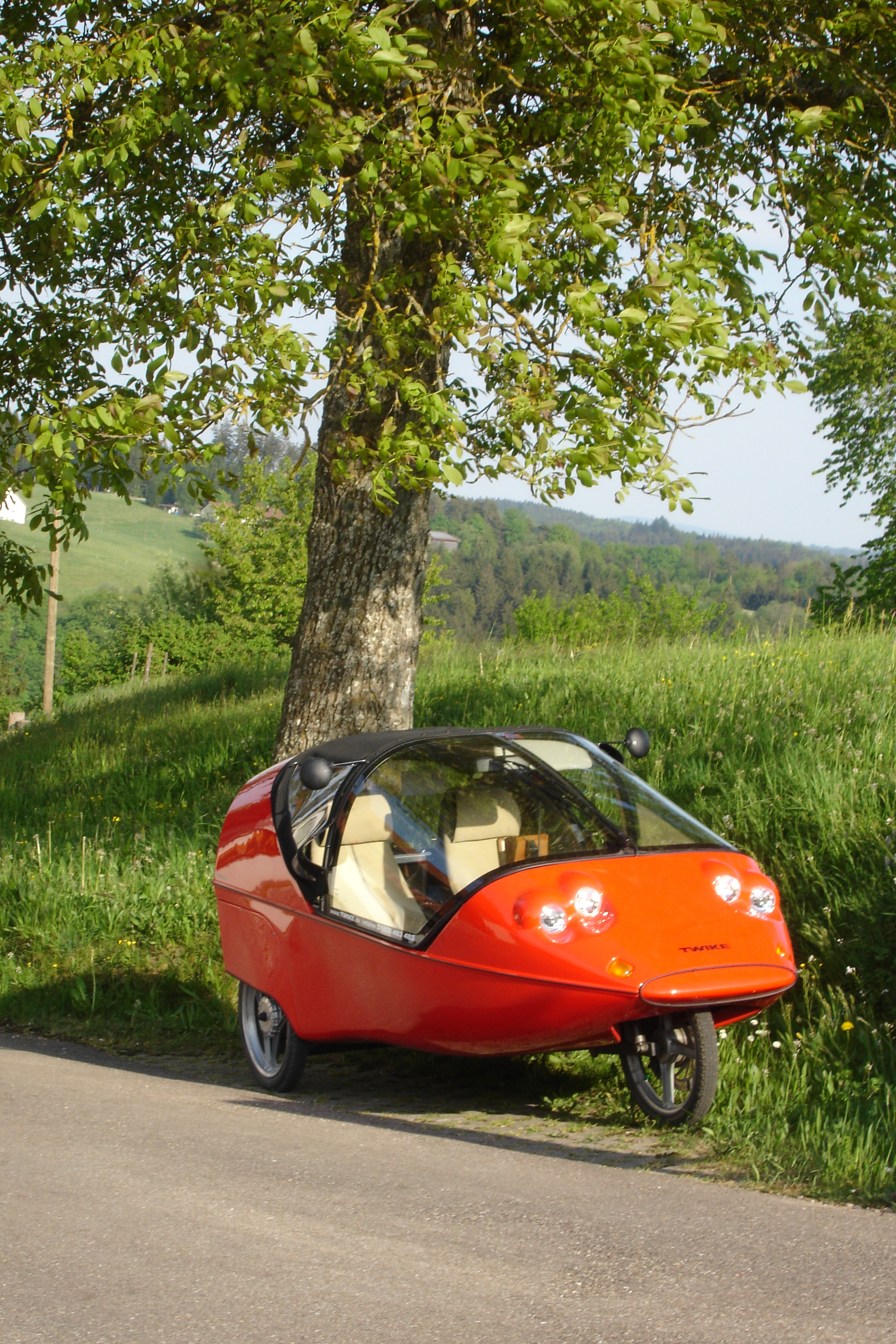
Red Twike Active

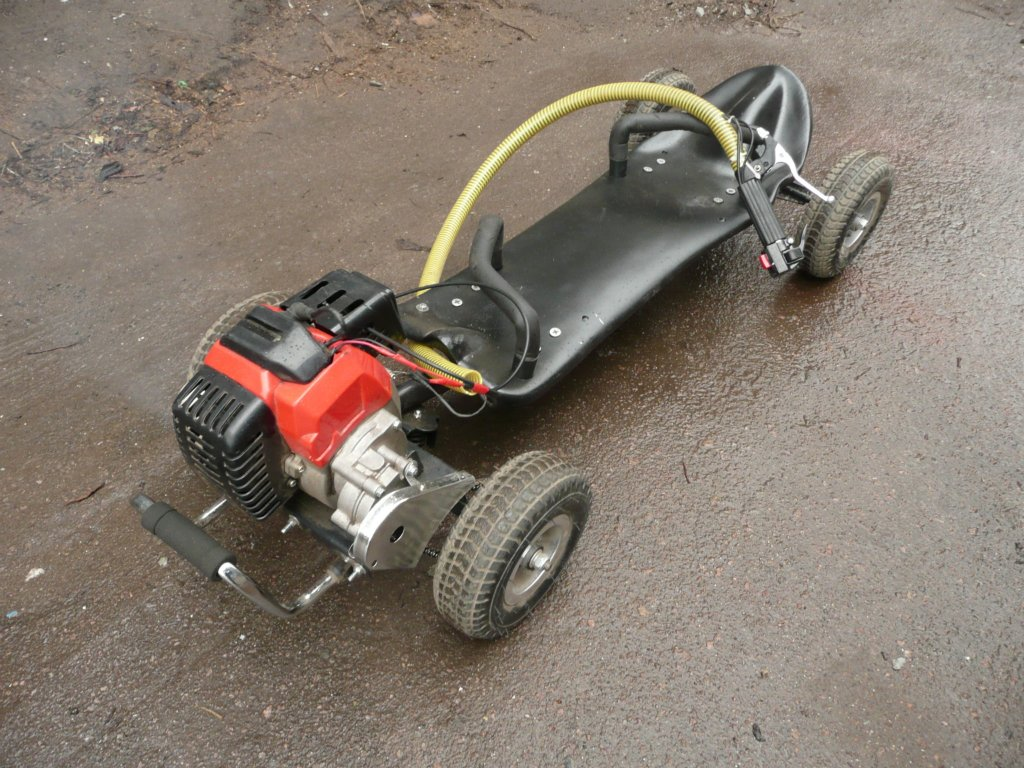
MotoBoard combustion engine skateboard, mid 2010s

== Terminology ==
The terminology for these devices is not yet stable (As of 2017) as the media and legislators discuss a rapidly emerging potential class of motor vehicle and its relationship to laws relating to other transport devices, including electric bicycles and mobility aids such as mobility scooters. Commonly used terms are used for these new devices include:

Media: rideable, electric rideable, electric personal transporter, personal electric vehicle, personal transporter portable electric vehicle. portable personal vehicle

Legislative: personal mobility device (Singapore, Australia - Victoria Transport Policy Unit) personal e-mobility device (Underwriters Laboratory), electrically motorized board (California, United States), personal light electric vehicles (European Union), electric personal assistive mobility device (Washington state, United States), powered transporters (UK).

Other languages: Engins de déplacement personnel (French), средства индивидуальной мобильности (Russian, lit. 'means of individual mobility').

== Types ==
=== Motorized scooter ===
The earliest example of a motorized scooter, or standing scooter with an internal combustion engine, was the 1915 Autoped, made in the US until 1919 and in Germany until 1922.

=== Electric standing scooter ===
An electric standing scooter with a small platform with two or more wheels driven by an electric motor. May be foldable for portability.

=== Electric skateboard ===
An electric skateboard is an electrically powered skateboard controlled by the rider shifting their weight and in some cases also a hand-held throttle.

=== Self-balancing scooter ===
The self-balancing scooter is a category of personal transporter which includes all self-balancing powered portable devices with two parallel wheels; these include the Segway PT, the Segway miniPRO and self-balancing hoverboards.

=== Electric unicycle ===
An electric unicycle is a single-rider electrically powered unicycle that balances itself automatically using computer-controlled accelerometers, gyroscopes, and a magnetometer.

=== Hybrids ===
The Onewheel has elements of an electric skateboard (it is powered) and a self-balancing unicycle (it has one wheel).

Types

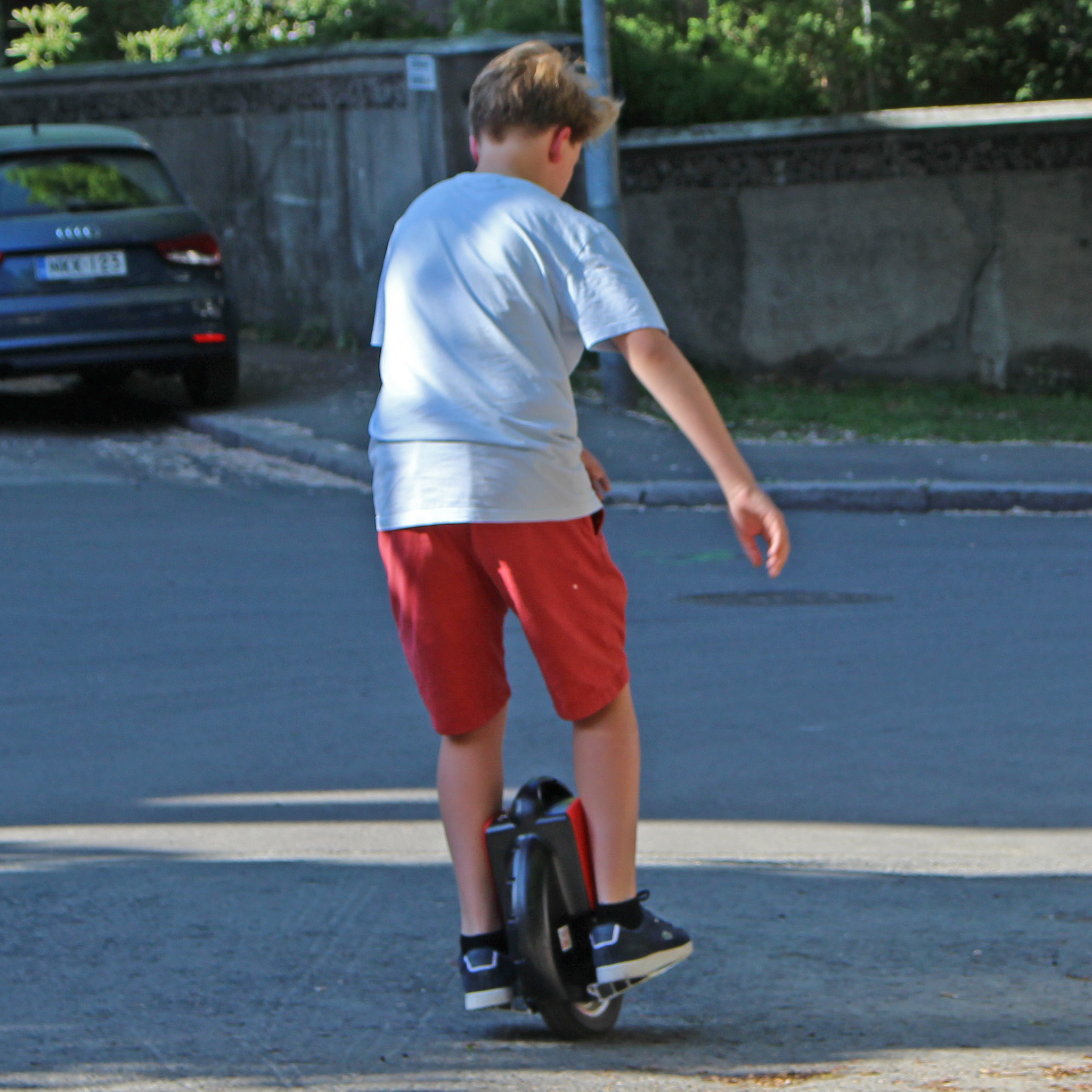
Boy riding an electric unicycle

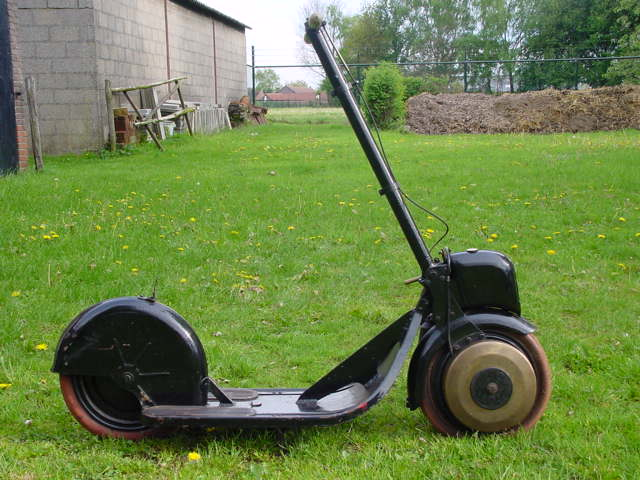
Gasoline-fueled 155 cc (9.5 cu in) four-stroke single Autoped Ever Ready

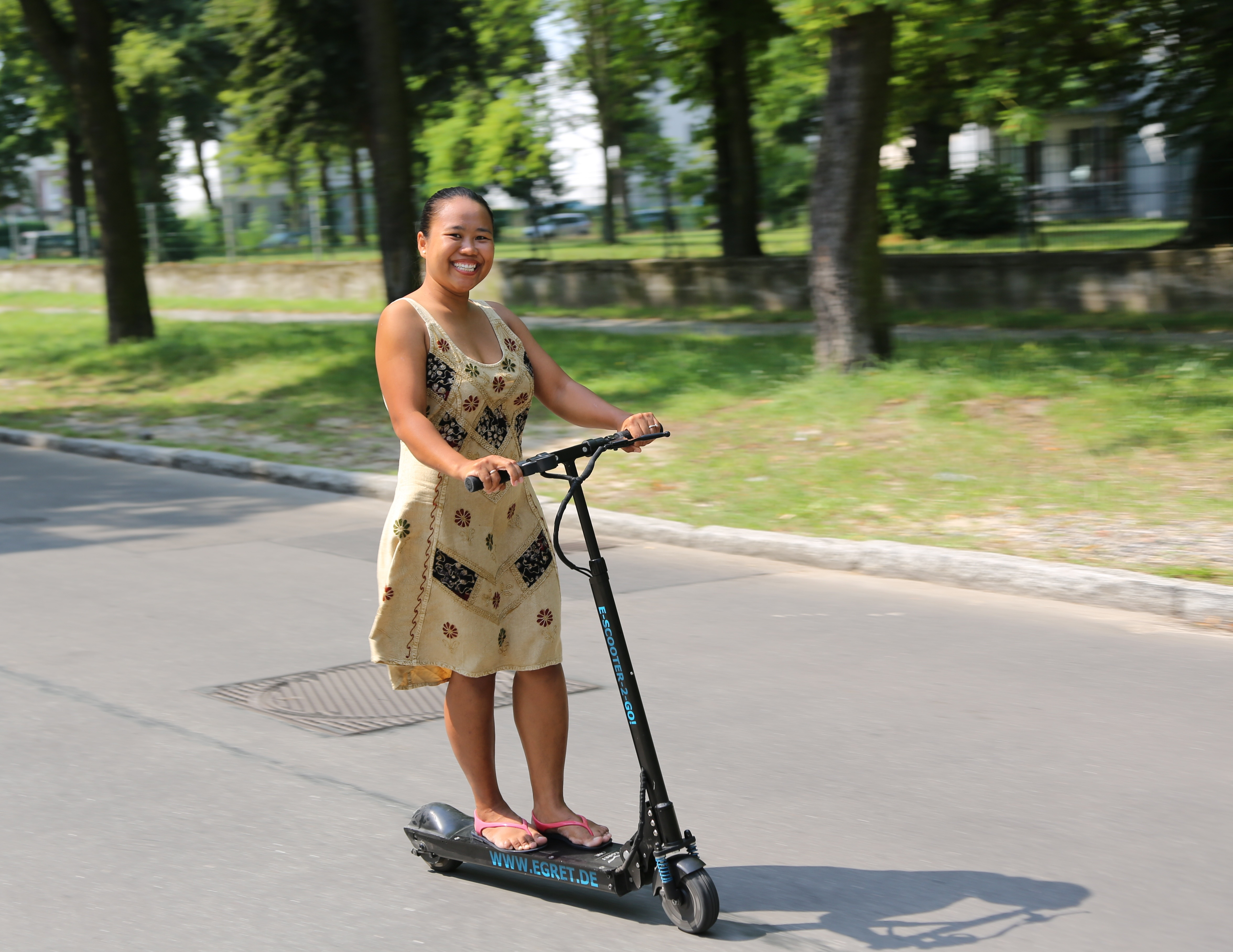
Electric kick scooter in use

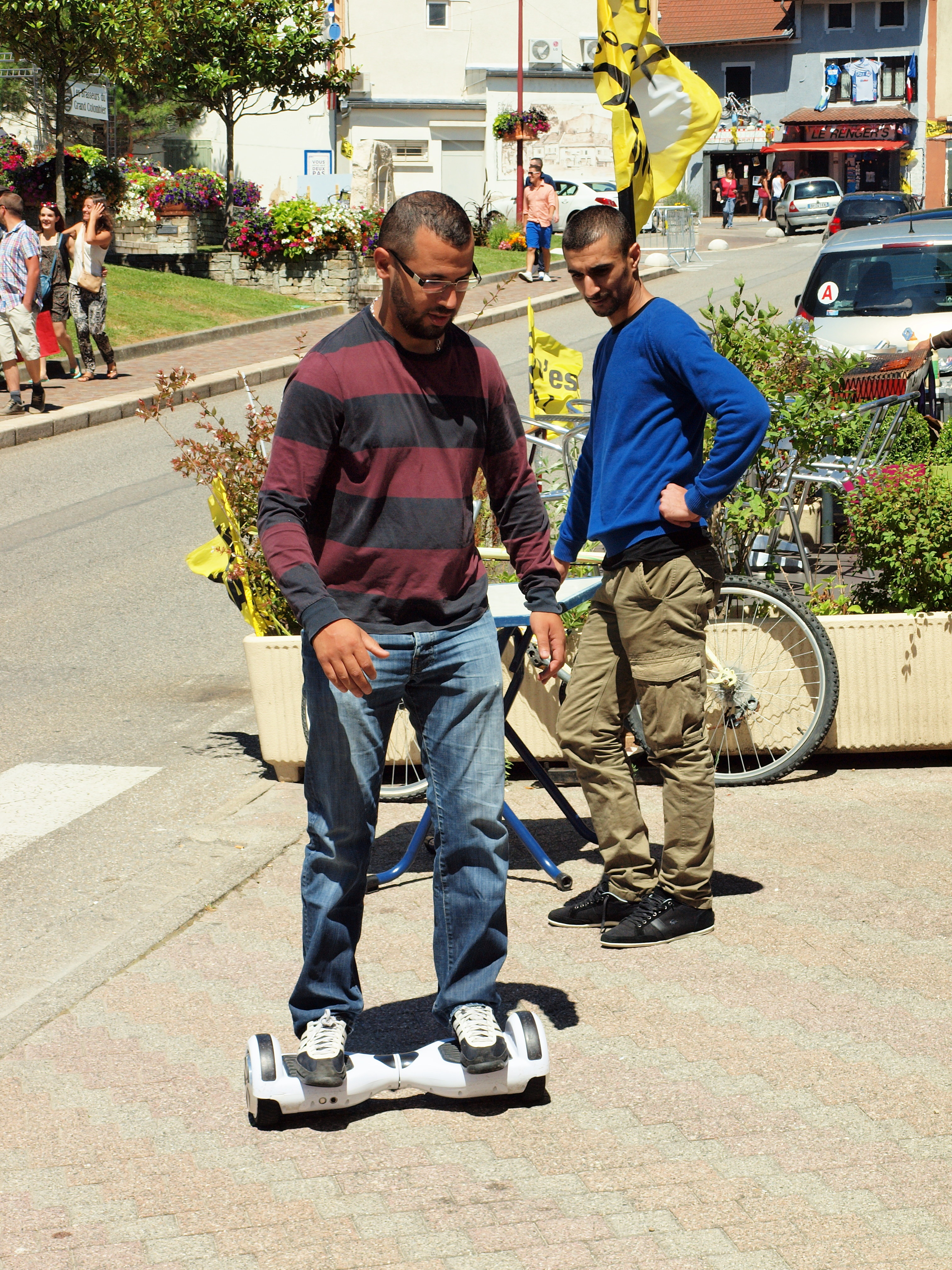
A self-balancing hoverboard

== Concept devices ==
The Honda UNI-CUB and its predecessor the Honda U3-X are concept seated devices that are fully stable that can travel sideways as well as in the forwards/backwards axis.

== Technology ==
=== Batteries ===
Most devices are powered by rechargeable lithium-ion vehicle batteries, and often 18650-size LiFePO_{4} batteries controlled by complex battery management systems. Lithium polymer batteries are being tested for higher performance.

Many devices now contain one, or sometimes two, batteries in the 101 to 160 Wh (360 to 580 kJ) range, which fall within the sizes that can be carried on an airline. Airlines may restrict carrying some devices due to the earlier product defects. As a rule, every 100 WHours of capacity will provide 6–7 miles of range.

These batteries, which have good energy density, energy-to-mass ratio provide the range, torque, operational life required, unlike the previously available lead–acid, NiMH and NiCad technologies.

=== Brushless motors ===
Many of these devices use brushless DC electric motors with permanent magnets attached to the moving hub which turns around a fixed armature which offer high efficiency, good speed-torque characteristics and low weight. This motor is often built into the wheel itself, eliminating gears and drive belts. Many devices have a motor in the 250-500 watts range which provides good performance for an adult rider on the flat and on an incline, with sportier models using motors in excess of 1500 Watts.

Brushless DC motors, which often have regenerative braking, also need complex motor controllers.

== Gallery ==
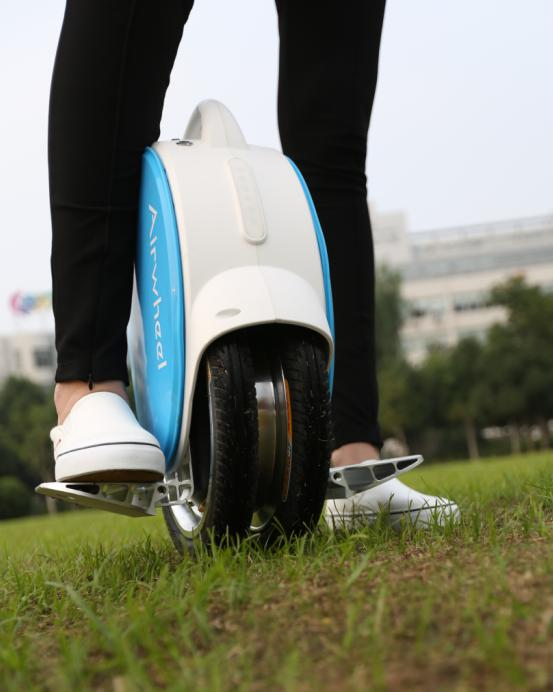
Airwheel Q5, a dual-wheeled self-balancing unicycle

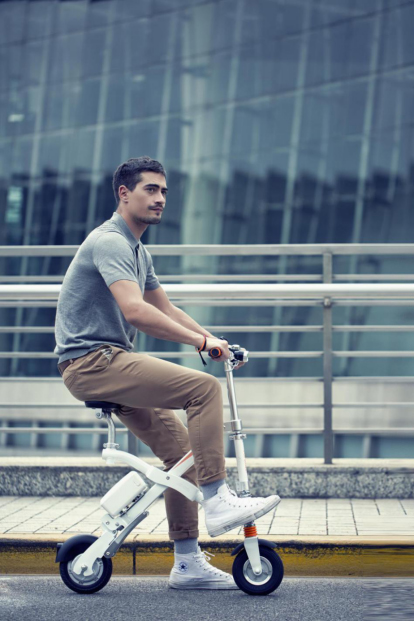
Airwheel E6

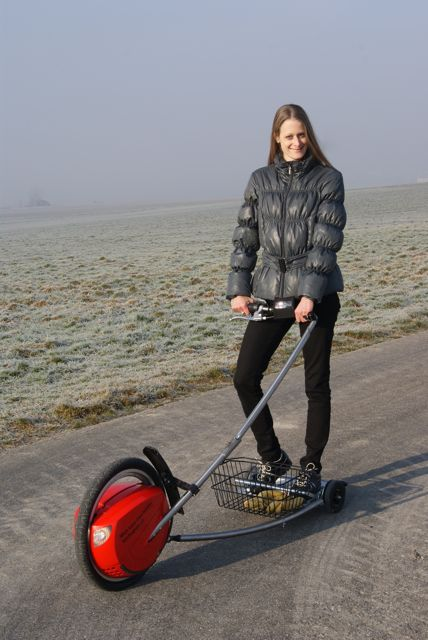
Easy glider

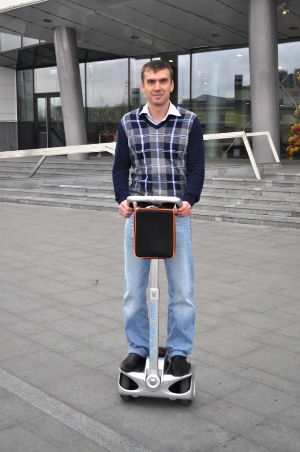
A self-balancing scooter with handlebars

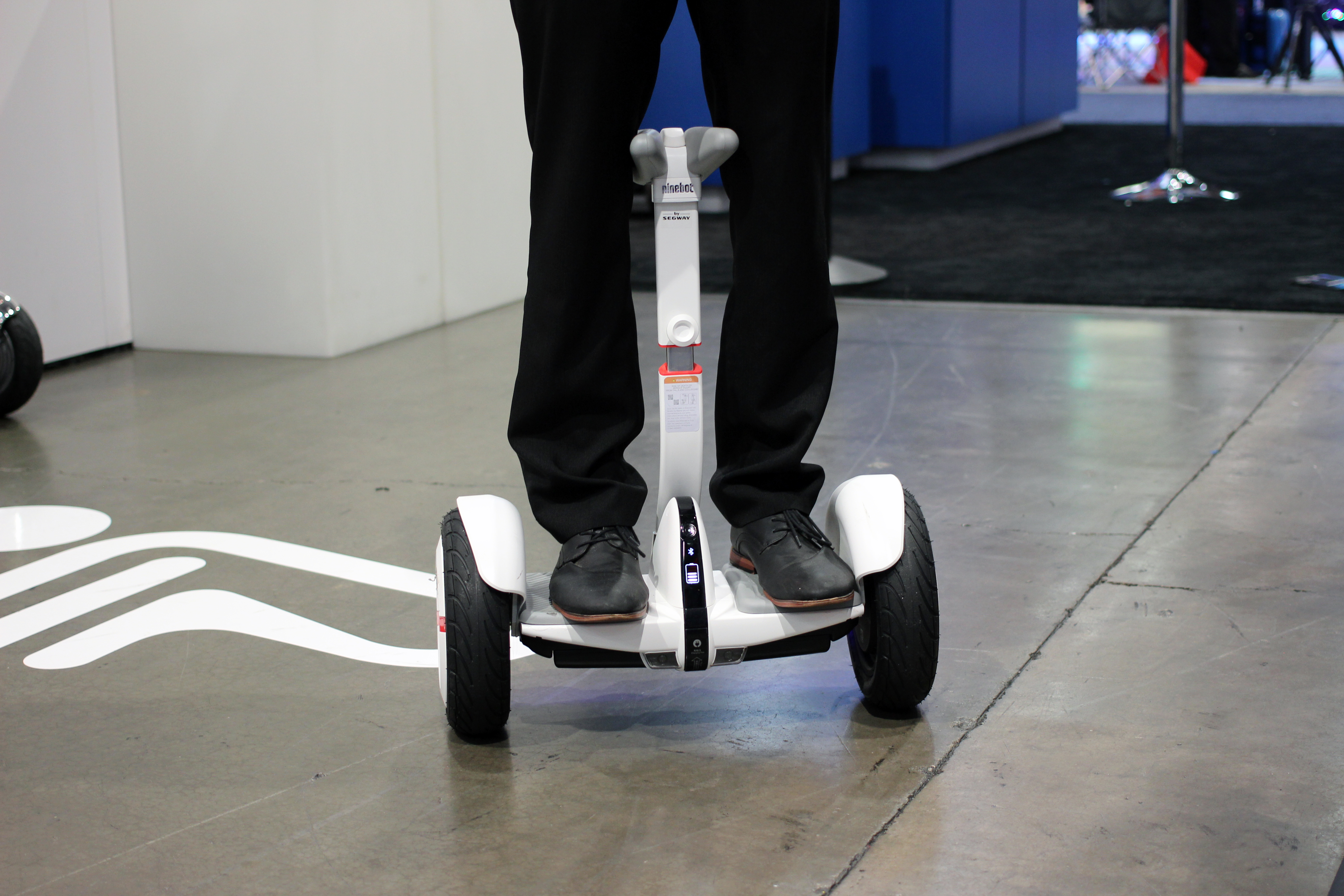
Segway miniPRO

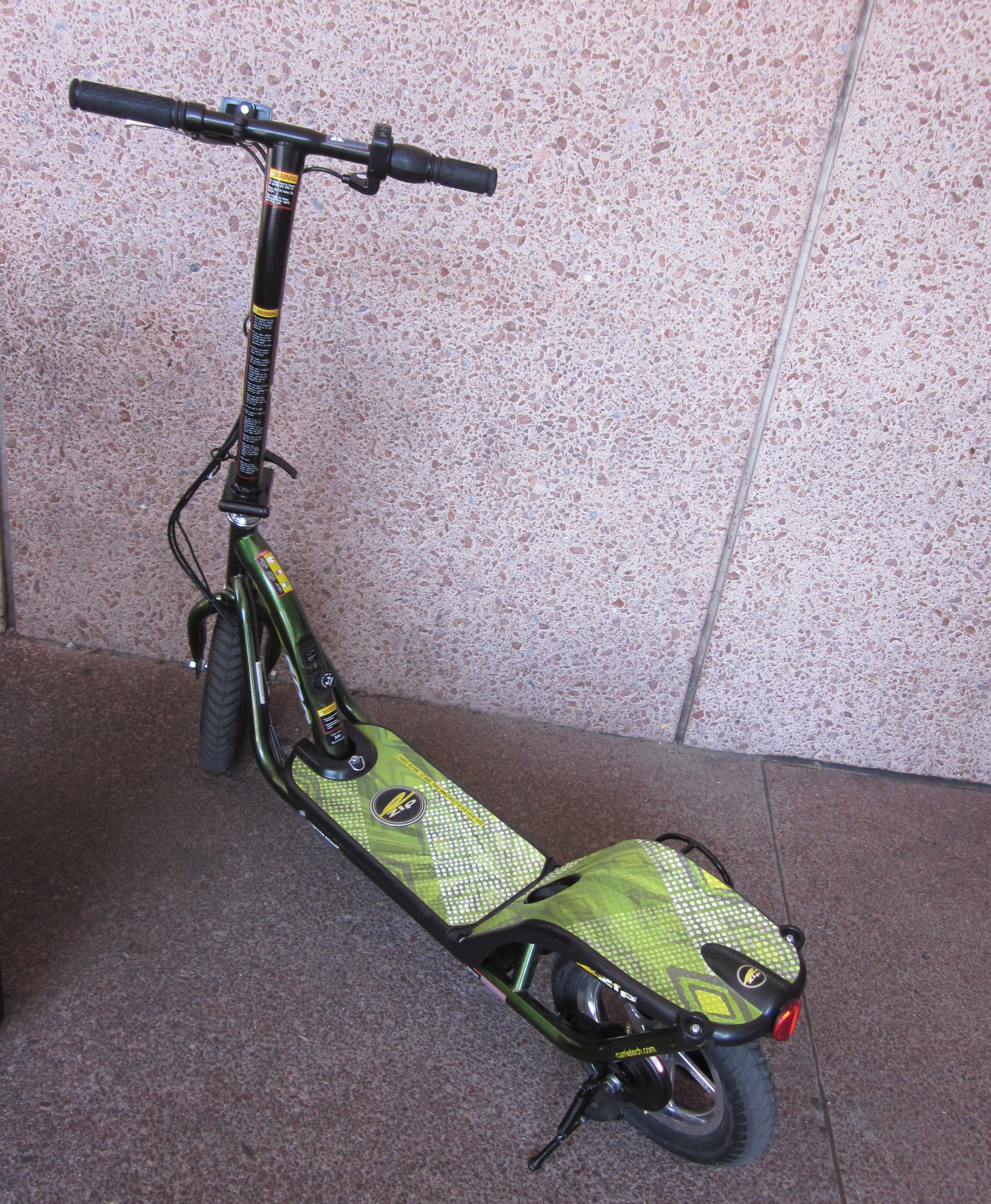
A modern electric kick scooter

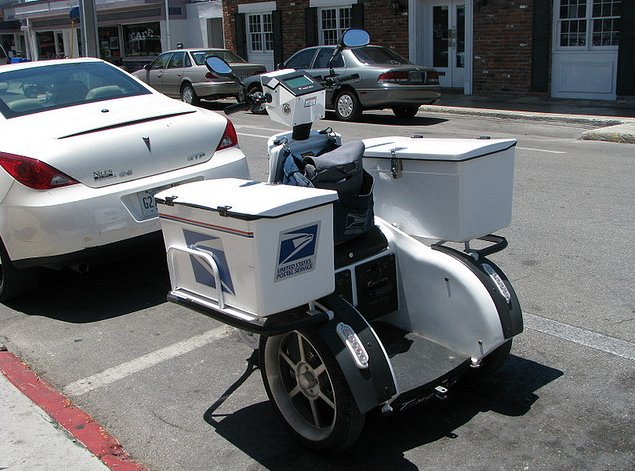
Segway PT equipped for mail delivery in the United States

RYNO single-wheeled self-balancing motorcycle

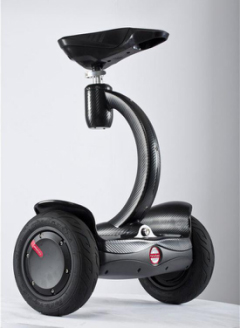
Airwheel S8, a self-balancing scooter with seat

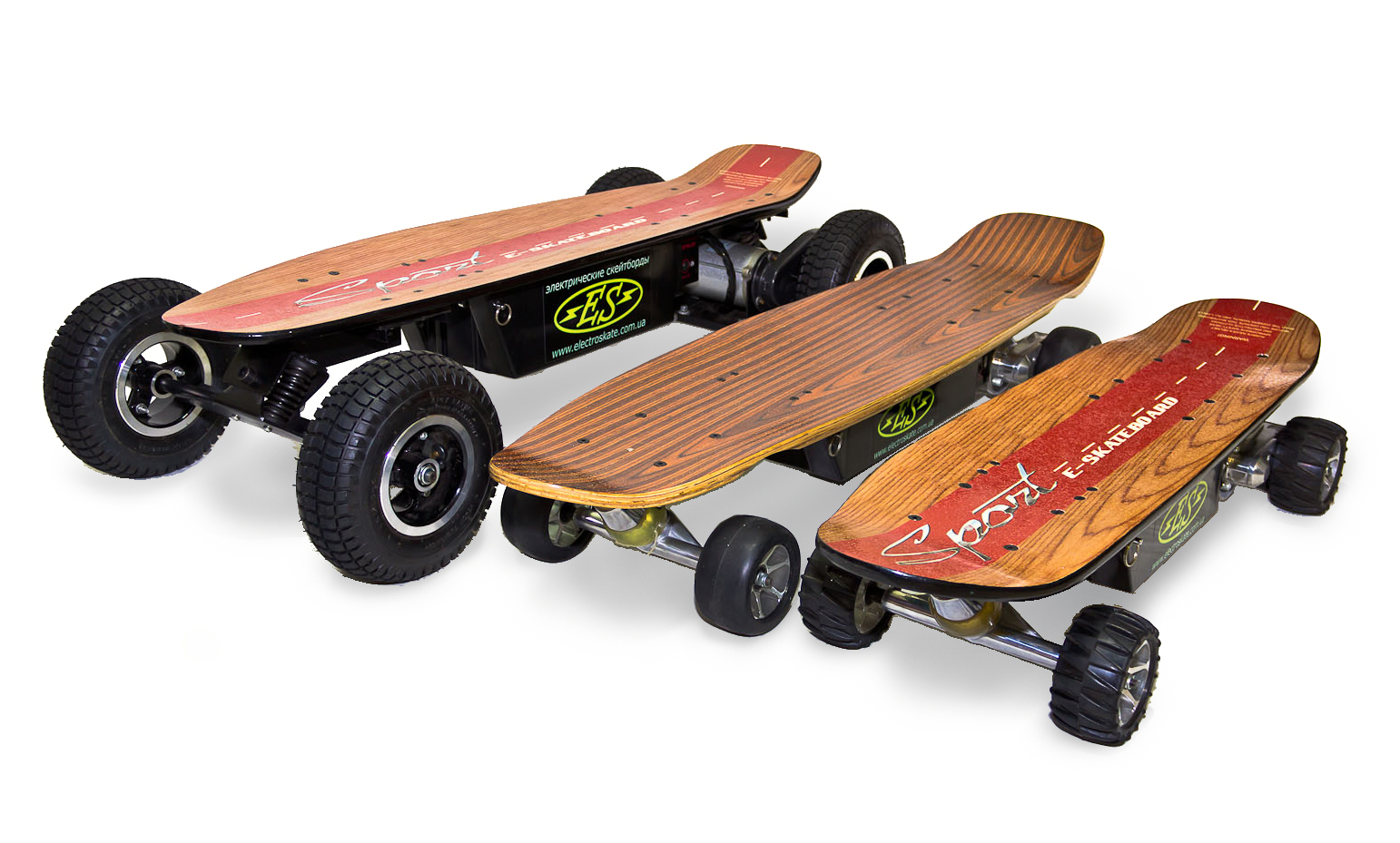
Various electric skateboards

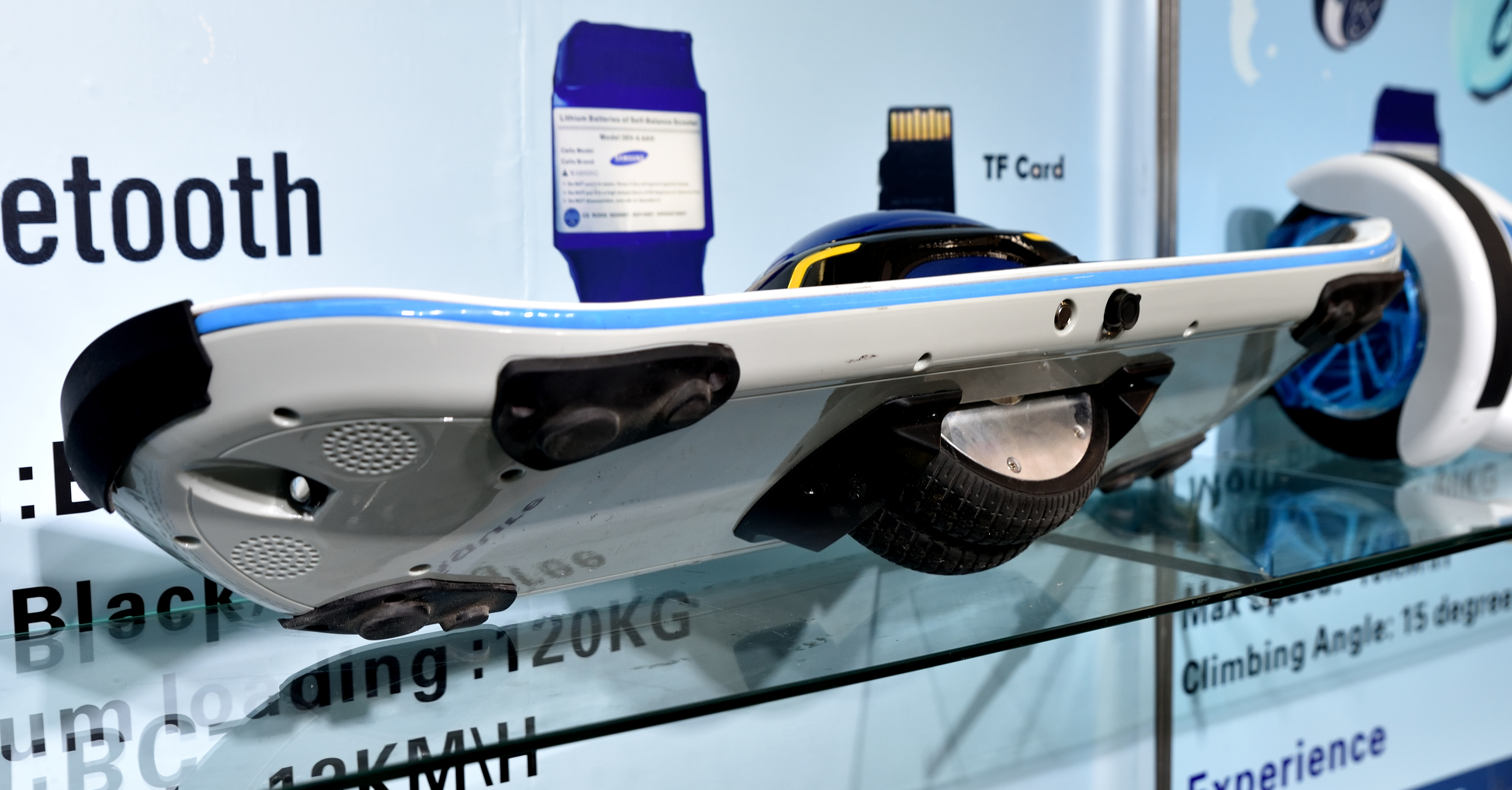
A self-balancing single-wheeled board

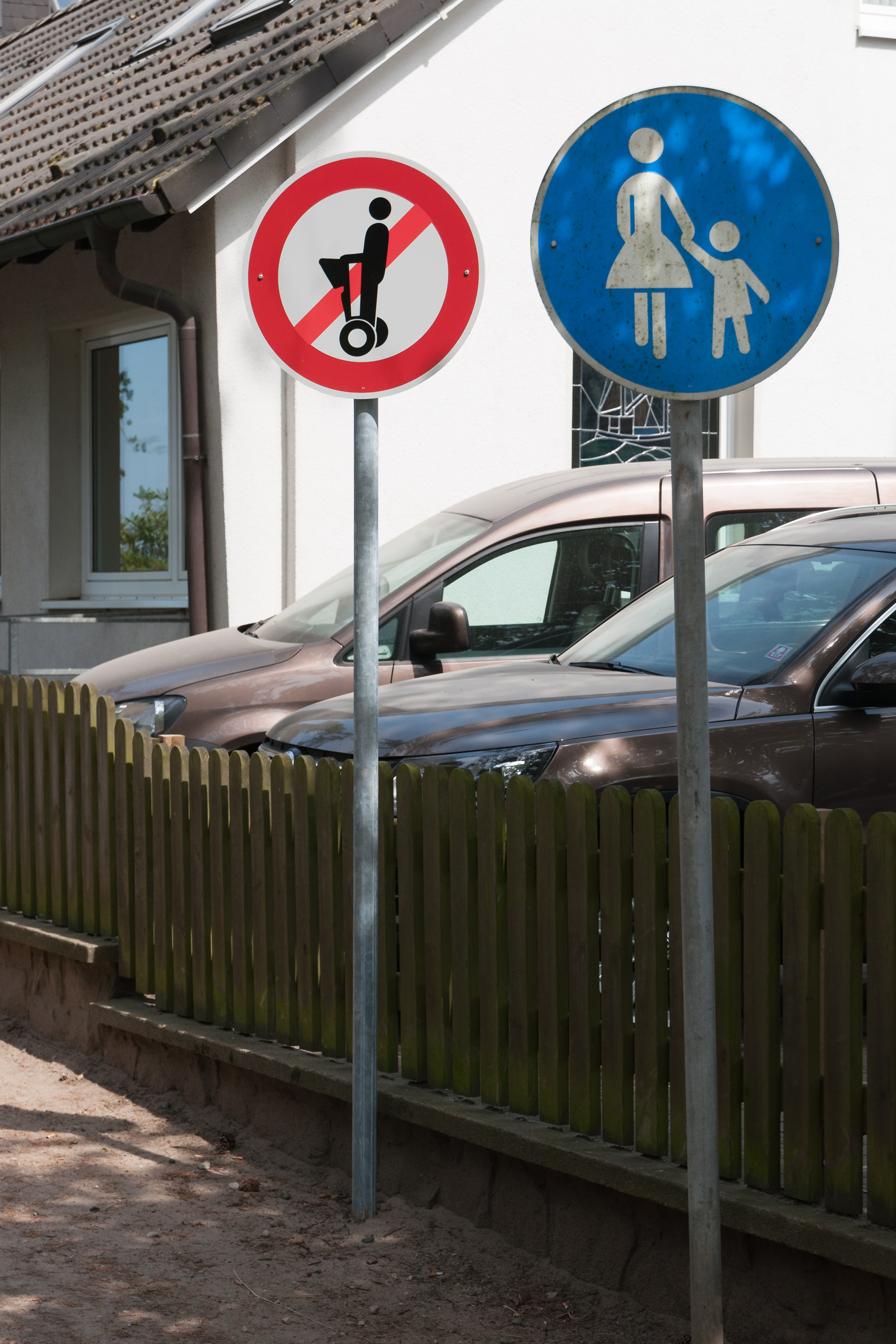
Segway prohibition sign, Germany

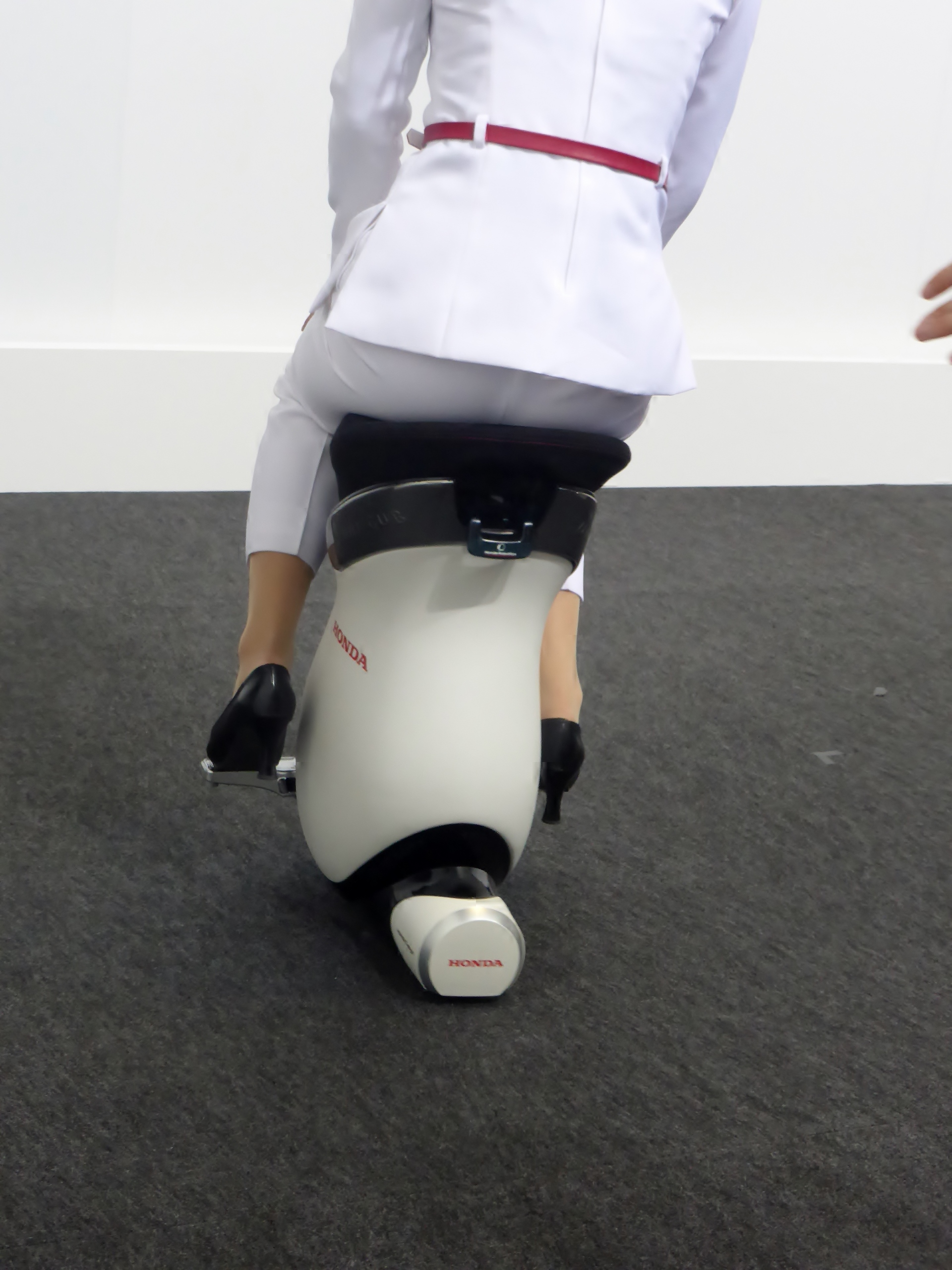
UNI-CUB concept from Honda (2013)

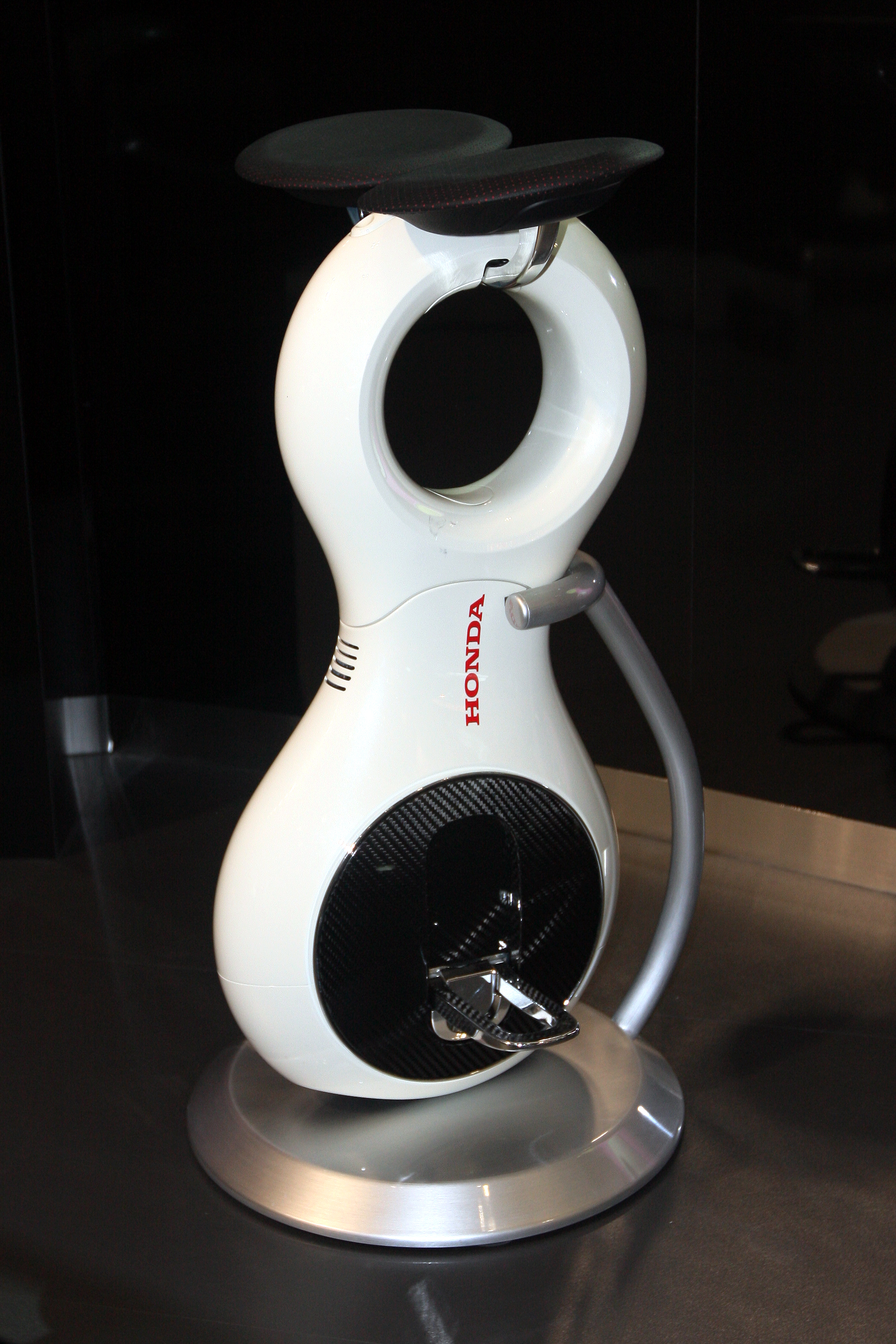
U3-X concept from Honda (2009)

== See also ==
- Alternatives to car use
- Electric bicycle laws
- Light electric vehicle
- Personal public transport
- Personal rapid transit
- Battery electric vehicle (BEV)
- Mobility schooter
- Motorized wheelchair
