= Honda UNI-CUB =

Personal Mobility Device by Honda

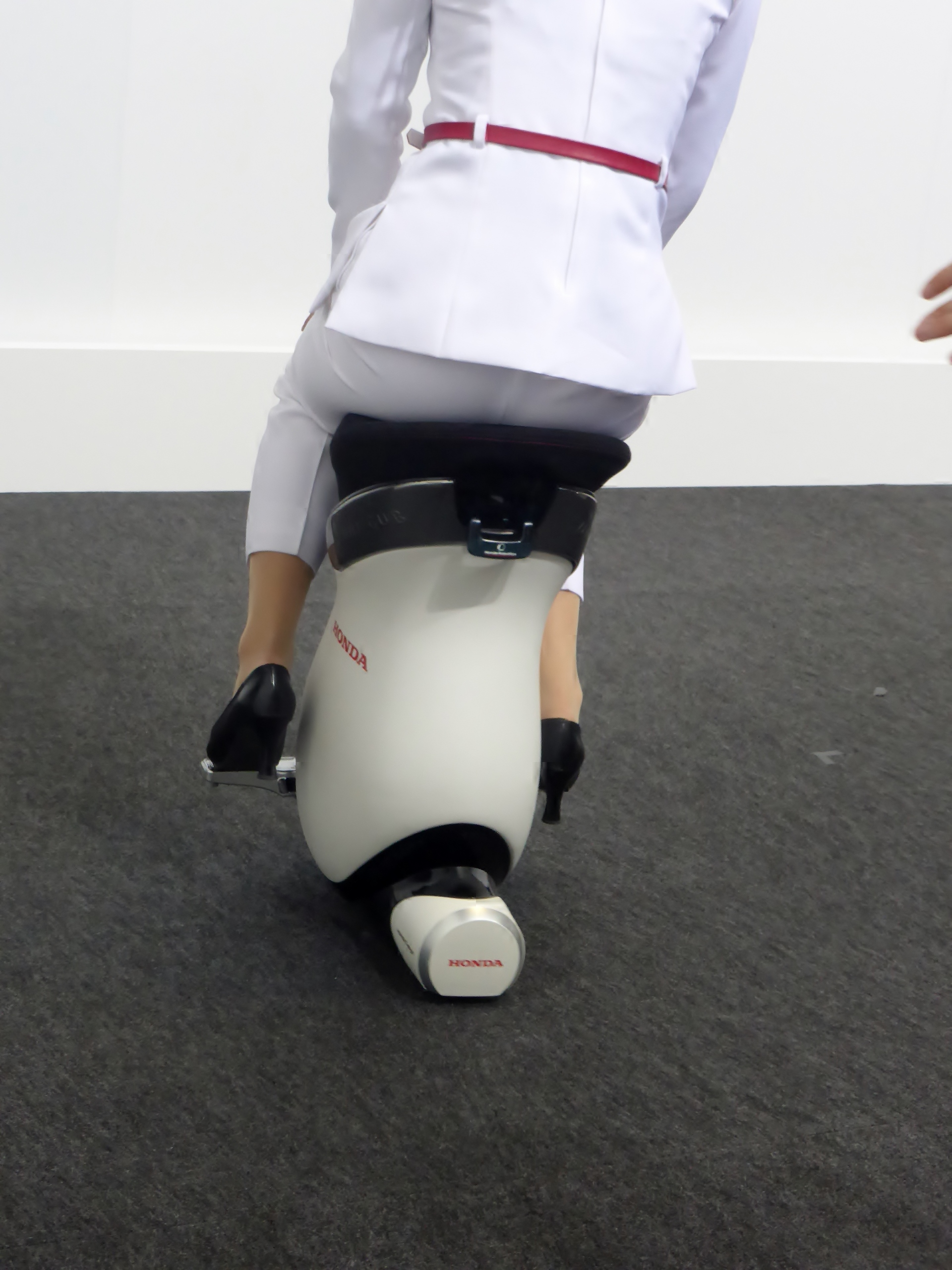
Honda UNI-CUB β at Osaka Motor Show 2013

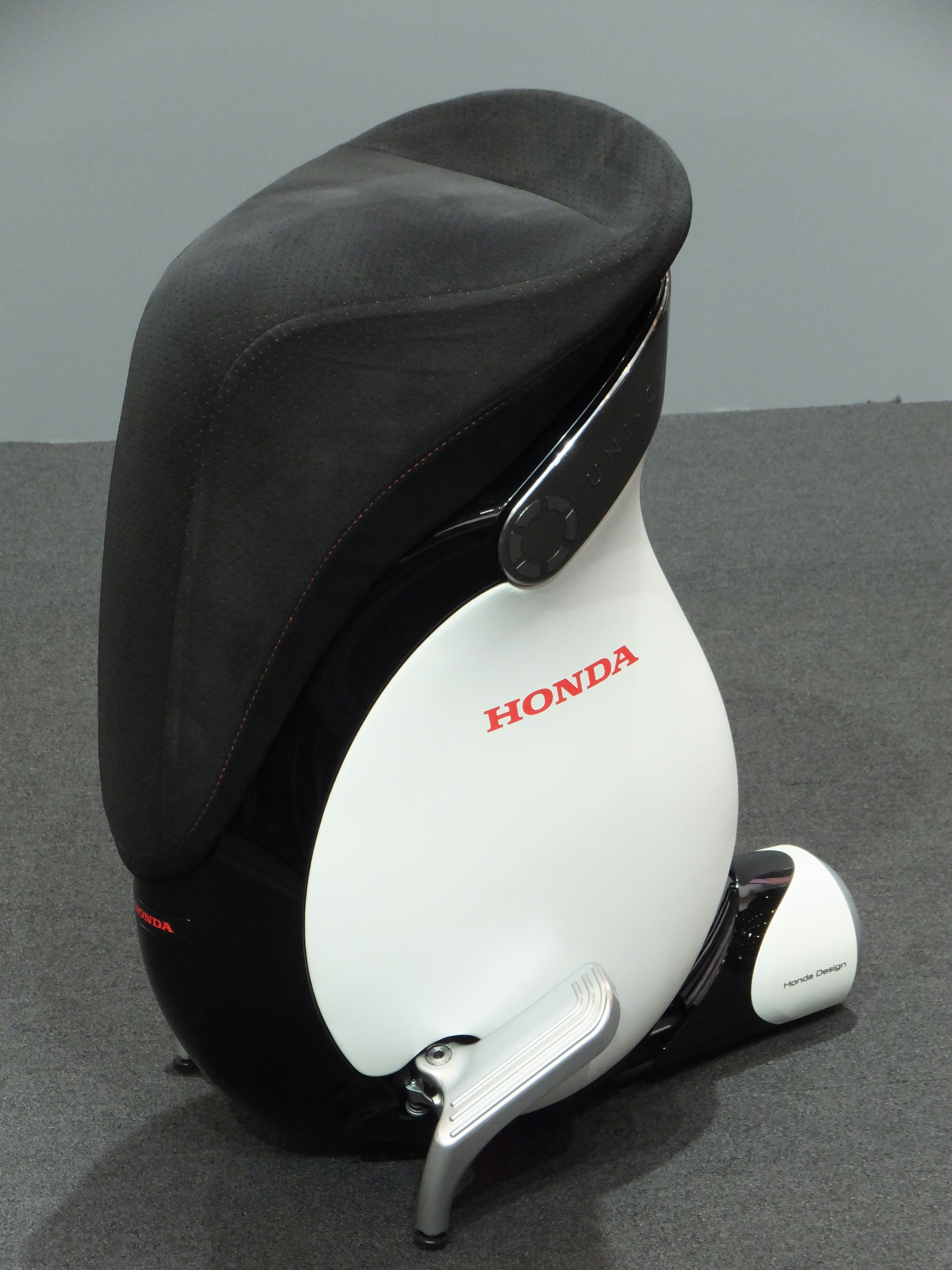
Honda UNI-CUB β at Tokyo Motor Show 2013

The Honda UNI-CUB is a concept 2-axis self-balancing personal transporter for use in barrier-free indoor environments, and shown at the Osaka Motor Show 2013.

== History ==
As a successor to the 2009 Honda U3-X, it was demonstrated at the Osaka Motor Show 2013. A launch date has not yet been announced.

== Design and operation ==
Controlled by weight-shifting, similar manner as that of the Segway PT, the unit is fully self-balancing and can move in any direction, including sideways.

There are two wheels, the larger driving wheel for travelling in a forward direction, and a trailing steering wheel at 90 degrees to this one. Both the drive wheel and the steering wheel however are constructed of multiple smaller 'planet' wheels that allow the wheel to be moved laterally. When moving forward the main wheel will be powered and the smaller planet wheels on the steering wheel will rotate to avoid the steering wheel dragging. To turn the steering wheel is rotated. To balance from side to side, or to self-balance laterally, the planet wheels on the drive wheel will be powered appropriately.

Measuring 510 x 315 x 620 mm and weighing 25 kg, the UNI-CUB is powered by a lithium-ion battery and has a 6 km/h top speed and 6 km range. The seat height is 620 mm, while footrests are designed to double as support stands.
