= Autoped =

Motorised scooter

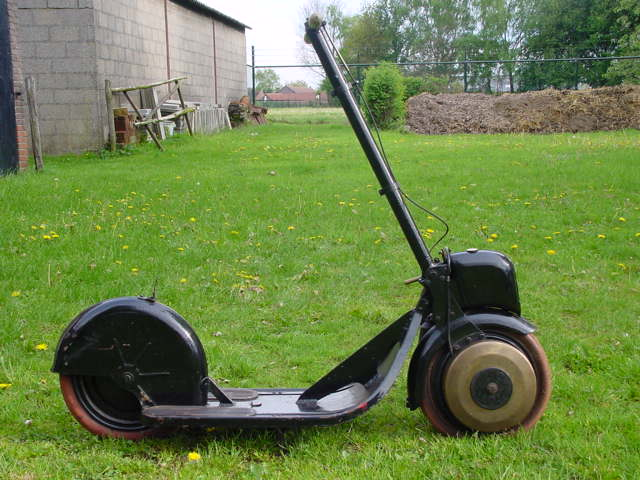
- 1919 Autoped Ever Ready
- Manufacturer: Autoped Company; Krupp
- Also called: Krupp-Roller
- Production: 1915–1921 (Autoped); 1919–1922 (Krupp)
- Class: Motorized scooter
- Engine: 155 cc (9.5 cu in) air-cooled single-cylinder (Autoped); 191 cc (11.7 cu in) air-cooled single-cylinder (Krupp)
- Bore / stroke: 56 mm × 63 mm (2.2 in × 2.5 in) (Autoped)
- Top speed: 20 mph (32 km/h) (Autoped); 35 km/h (22 mph) (Krupp)
- Power: 1.1 kW (1.5 hp) (Autoped); 1.3 kW (1.7 hp) (Krupp)
- Ignition type: Flywheel magneto
- Transmission: Clutch operated by handlebar column
- Frame type: Welded steel
- Suspension: None
- Tires: 10 in (250 mm)

The Autoped was an early motorized scooter manufactured by the Autoped Company of Long Island City, New York from 1915 to 1922.

The driver stood on a platform with 10-inch tires and operated the machine using only the handlebars and steering column, pushing them forward to engage the clutch, using a lever on the handlebar to control the throttle, and pulling the handlebars and column back to disengage the clutch and apply the brake. After riding, the steering column would be folded onto the platform to store the scooter more easily. The engine was an air-cooled, 4-stroke, 155 cc engine over the front wheel. The bike came with a headlamp and tail lamp, a Klaxon horn, and a toolbox. It was quite efficient, but was not widely distributed.

A patent for the Autoped as a "self-propelled vehicle" was applied for in July 1913 and granted in July 1916. An early description of the Autoped described it as having a hollow steering column that acted as the fuel tank. However, the production version had a fuel tank above the front mudguard.

The Autoped went out of production in the United States in 1921, but was manufactured by Krupp in Germany from 1919 to 1922.

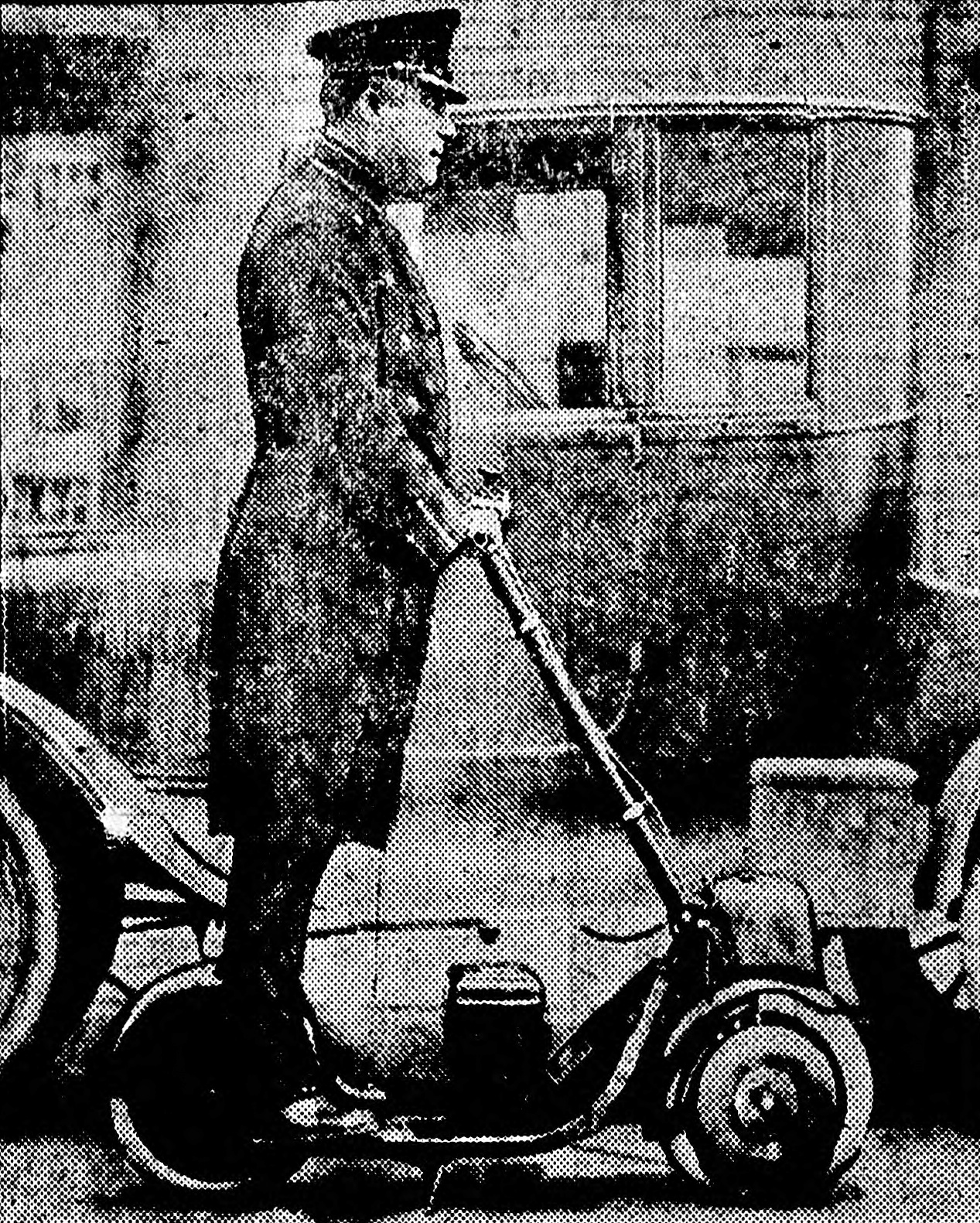
Historical photo of an Autoped in use by a traffic cop in Newark, New Jersey, 1922

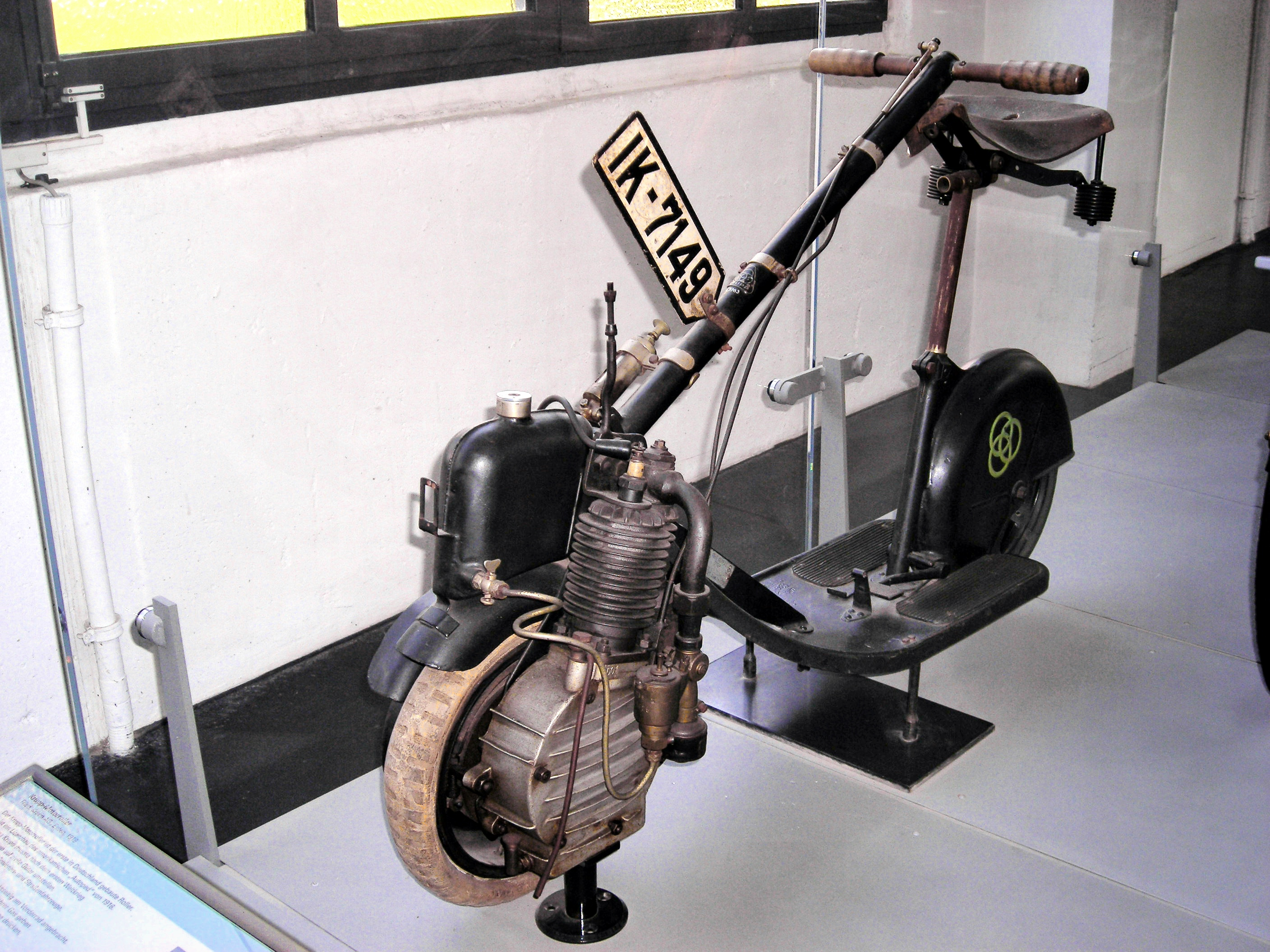
Krupp licence-built Autoped with seat

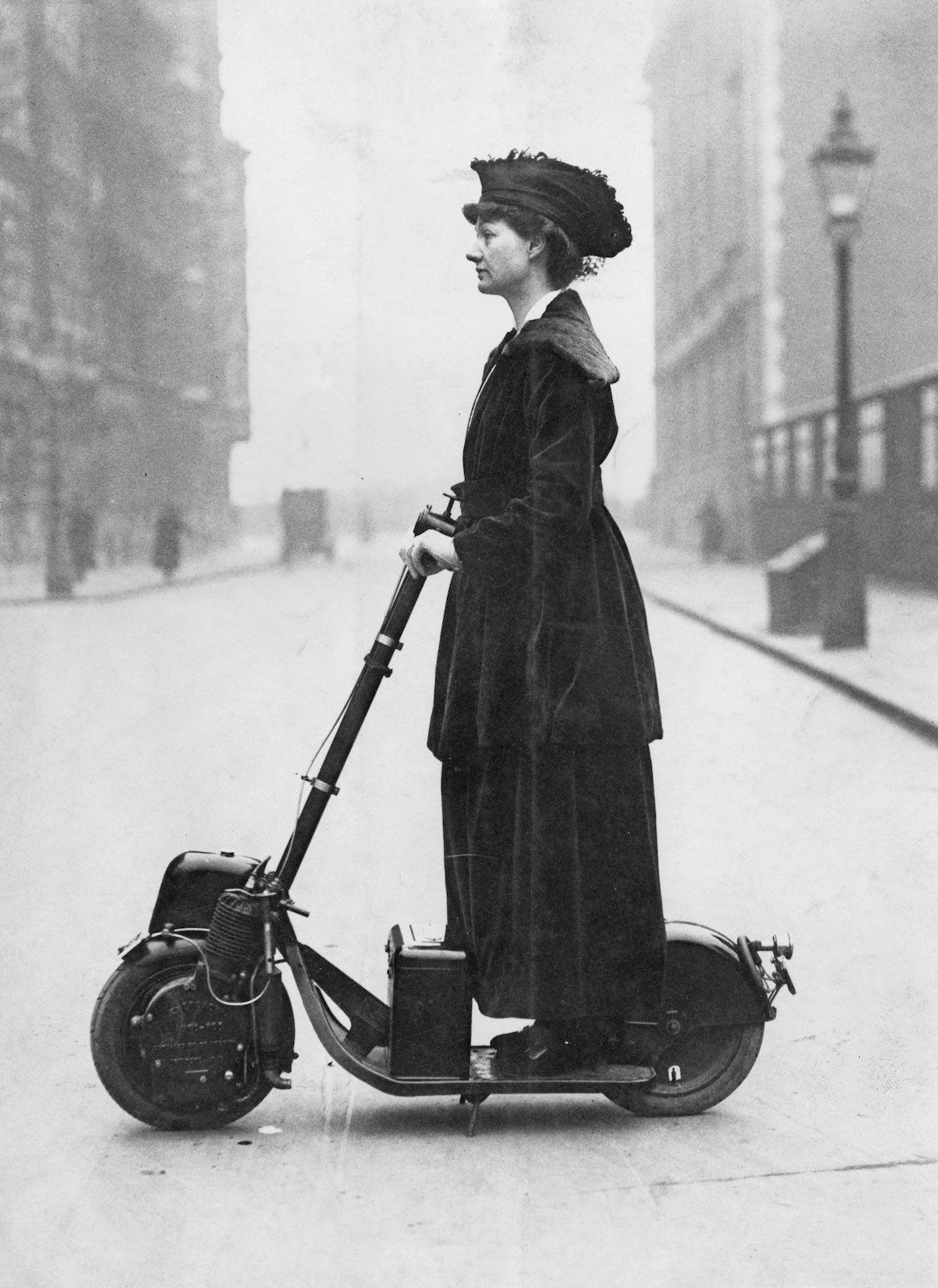
Lady Florence Priscilla Norman, a suffragette, on her motor-scooter in 1916

== See also ==
- List of motorcycles of the 1910s
- Moped
- Personal transporter

== Bibliography ==
- Jacquet, Florian (ed.). "ScooterManiac – Autoped". ScooterManiac. Florian JACQUET, webmaster. Archived from the original on 2011-07-24.
- Johnston, Paul F. (ed.). "America On The Move – Pope, Cleveland, Autoped, and Simplex". America On The Move. Smithsonian National Museum of American History. Archived from the original on 2012-10-19.
- Partridge, Michael (1976). "1916 1^{3}/_{4} hp Autoped Scooter". Motorcycle Pioneers: The Men, the Machines, the Events 1860–1930. David & Charles (Publishers). pp. 70–71. ISBN 0 7153 7 209 2.
- US patent 1192514, Gibson, Arthur Hugo Cecil, "SELF-PROPELLED VEHICLE", issued 1916-07-25, assigned to Auto-Ped Company of America
- Wilson, Hugo (1995). The Encyclopedia of the Motorcycle. London: Dorling Kindersley. ISBN 0-7513-0206-6.
- Windsor, H. H., ed. (August 1914). "New Power Vehicle Built on Unique Lines". Popular Mechanics. 22 (2). Hearst Magazines: 163. ISSN 0032-4558. "The engine, 2^{1}/_{2} hp., is built in the front wheel, and the steering pillar is hollow, serving also as the gasoline-supply tank."
- "Autoped Scooter by Imperial Motors".
