= Honda U3-X =

One-wheeled personal transporter

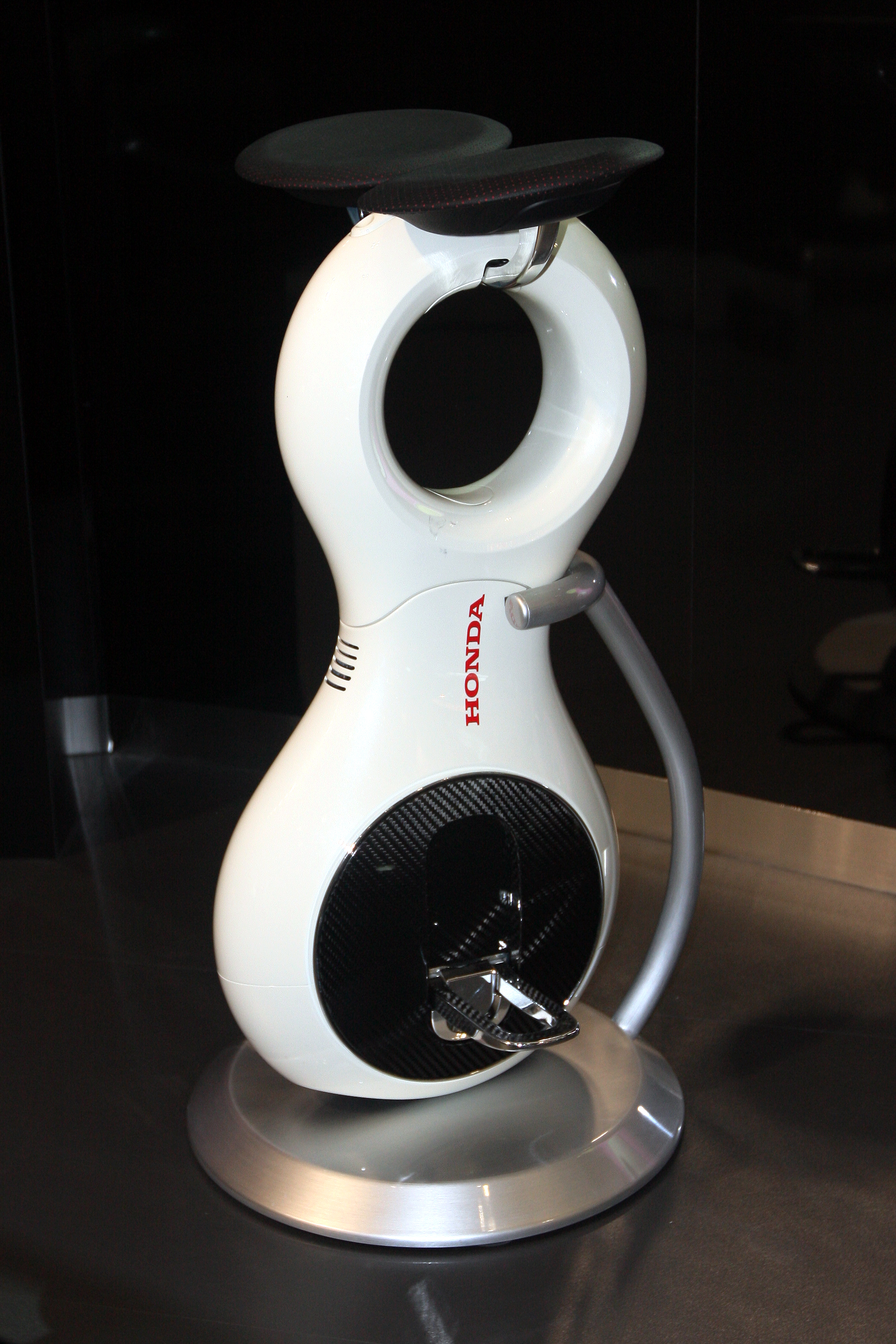

The Honda U3-X is an experimental self-balancing one-wheeled personal transporter shown in 2009.

== History ==
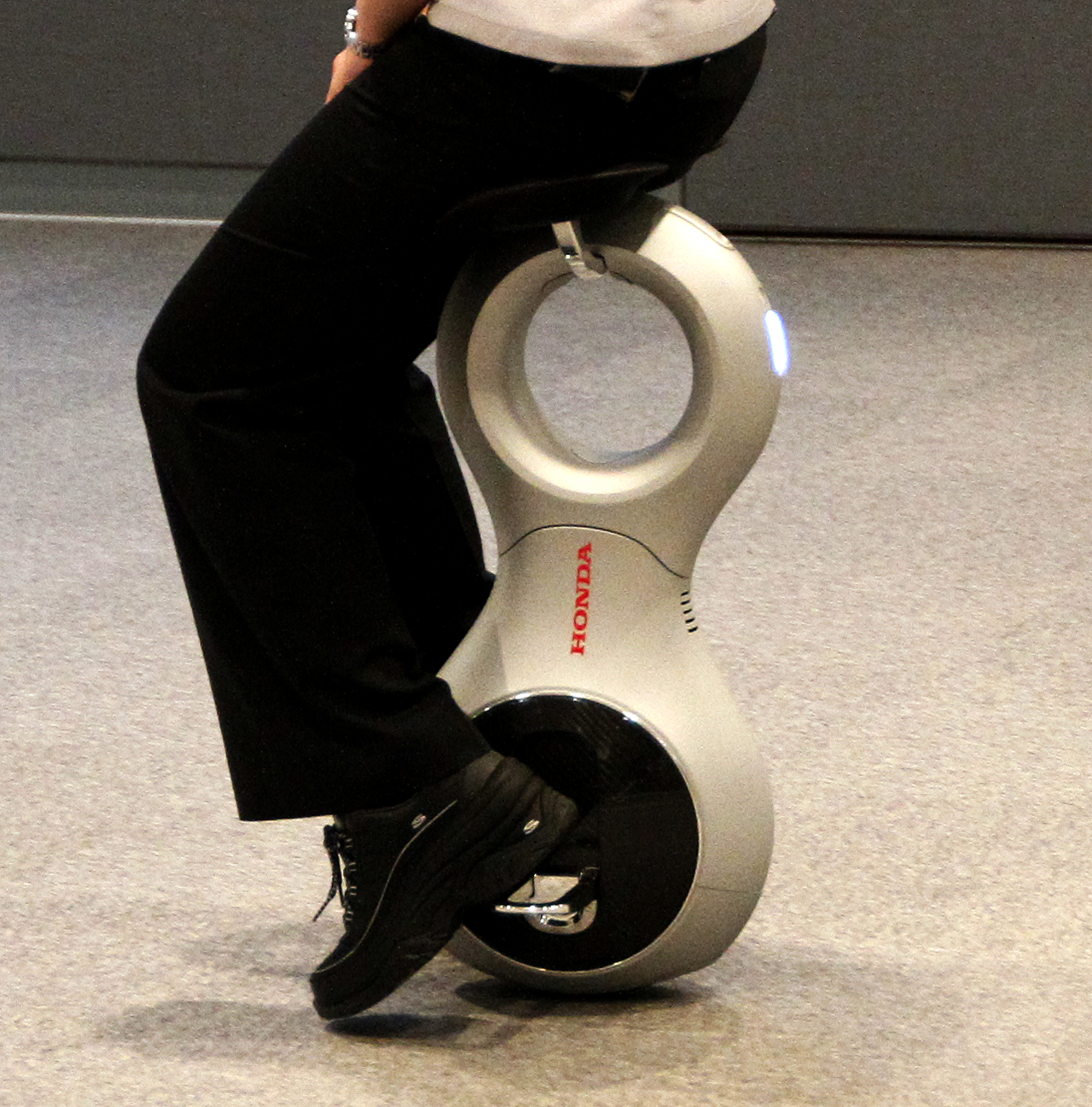

It was unveiled by Honda's CEO on September 24, 2009, and it was announced that it would be shown at the 2009 Tokyo Motor Show. Time magazine called it one of the 50 best inventions of 2009. In April 2010, Honda engineers did a short demonstration of two of the devices in Times Square, New York City. In May 2010, Honda representatives demonstrated the U3-X at the Honda Collection Hall in Motegi, Tochigi, Japan

Honda presented the Honda UNI-CUB, a successor to this device at Osaka Motor Show 2013.

== Design and operation ==
Honda developed the U3-X with technology originally developed for ASIMO the bipedal human robot project. Honda states that the "U" stands for unicycle and for universal. It weighs 10 kg (22 lb) and travels at 6 km/h (3.7 mph), a similar speed to the Toyota Winglet. Honda U3-X is a compact experimental device that fits comfortably between the rider's legs, to provide free movement in all directions just as in human walking - forward, backward, side-to-side, and diagonally. It uses Honda Omni-Traction (HOT) drive system to permit it to move in any lateral direction. The system uses multiple small diameter motorised wheels connected inline to form one large diameter wheel. Rotating the large diameter wheel moves the U3-X forward and backward, while rotating the small diameter wheels moves it side-to-side. Combining these movements causes the U3-X to move diagonally.

It has not been announced yet whether the vehicle will be offered for public sale. The price is not announced yet.

=== Specifications ===
Honda stated the U3-X key specifications as follows:

- Length 313 mm (12.3 in)
- Width (stowed) 160 mm (6.3 in)
- Height (stowed) 647 mm (25.5 in)
- Weight < 10 kg (22 lb)
- Top speed 6 km/h (3.7 mph)
- Drive system: Omni Traction Drive System
- Battery type: Lithium-ion battery
- Operation time: ≈ 1 hour

== See also ==
- Toyota Winglet
- Segway PT
