= Personal transporter regulation by country =

Laws regulating small electric vehicles

A personal transporter (also powered transporter, personal electric vehicle (PEV), personal mobility device, etc.) is any of a class of compact, mostly recent (21st century), motorised micromobility vehicle for transporting an individual at speeds that do not normally exceed 25 km/h (16 mph). They include electric skateboards, e-scooters, self-balancing unicycles, Segways, and motorised scooters. Many newer versions use recent advances in vehicle battery and motor-control technologies. They are growing in popularity, and legislators are in the process of determining how these devices should be classified, regulated and accommodated during a period of rapid innovation.

== Asia ==
=== Hong Kong ===
Early 2019 according to secretary Chan, the Government is conducting a "consultation research (顧問研究)". That does not mean that personal transporter is legal. The Transport Department issued a 2015 statement that under the Road Traffic Ordinance, a personal transporter is classified as motor vehicle, since it is mechanically propelled.

Registration and licence is required before any motor vehicle is used on the roads, including private roads. However, since the construction and operation of these motor-driven devices could pose a danger to the users themselves and other road users, they are not appropriate to use on roads, hence they cannot be registered and licensed.

According to police statistics, there were 9 complaints, 1 arrest and 1 accident between 5 July and 19 November 2019.

=== Israel ===
In 2006, the Segway PT was approved for use on sidewalks and other pedestrian designated locations, and on roads without sidewalks, with obstructed sidewalks or sidewalks that lack curb cuts. The user must be over 16 years old. No license is required. The maximum allowed speed is 13.5 km/h (8.4 mph), enforced by electronic restriction put in place by the importer.

=== Japan ===
In a court, Segway PT was classified as a motorcycle, owing to the power output; however, there is no report of registration. Segway Japan, an authorized dealer, sells Segways only to corporations to use in facilities.

=== Saudi Arabia ===
In Mecca they were banned after a video of a pilgrim, using it during hajj on a hoverboard was posted on social media.

=== Singapore ===
In December 2016 the Land Transport Authority started a 6-month trial where devices were allowed on trains and buses at all times.

Personal transporters are not allowed on public roads. A bill in early 2020 bans all personal transporters on sidewalks / footpaths, and requires shops to give notices regarding this ban. Since sometime in 2019, riding personal transporters in the HDB common areas could result in a fine up to S$5,000. The fine also applies to bicycles and motorized bicycles.

== Europe ==
The European Committee for Standardization (CEN) has been in the process of defining a standard for personal transporters, referred to as 'personal light electric vehicle', including both self-balancing vehicles and standing vehicles with maximum speeds of up to 25 km/h (16 mph) and is expected to complete its work by the end of 2017. In the meantime some countries have allowed personal transporters to be used on public roads with certain conditions.

The European Committee for Electrotechnical Standardization (CENELEC) has adopted the IEC standards as European Standards:

– EN IEC 63281-2-1:2024 - E-Transporters - Part 2-1: Safety requirements and test methods for personal e-Transporters

– EN IEC 63281-1:2023 - E-Transporters - Part 1: Terminology and classification

which provides relevant terminology and specifies safety requirements and test methods for personal e-transporters (PeTs). These European and International standards are applicable to electrically powered personal e-Transporters (PeTs) which are used in private and public areas, where the speed control and/or the steering control is electric/electronic.

=== Åland islands ===
A law revision by the Government of Åland concerning "small electrically powered vehicles" means the Segway PT and all other mainly one person electrical vehicles have been classified as bicycles since 14 March 2012.

=== Austria ===
The type Segway i2 is (width 63 cm) narrower than the 80 cm (31 in) width limit and has a low-enough maximum speed to come under laws relating to electric bicycles and therefore has to use cycle lanes and paths, otherwise street lanes. The type Segway x2 reaches with its bigger wheels 84 cm width and is, therefore, an electric vehicle, that needs a license and insurance. Neither type may use sidewalks (lengthwise) or pedestrian zones (unless exemption stated).

=== Belgium ===
In Belgium the law was recently adjusted allowing electrical motorized devices to the public road. Art 2.15.2. Devices with a max speed of 18 km/h (11 mph) can ride on the cycle path. One can also use these devices on sidewalks at a walking pace. Devices with a higher maximum speed are subject under the existing rules for motorised vehicles. An insurance and protective wear will be required in any cases.

=== Croatia ===
Use of a Segway PT is allowed within city limits wherever pedestrians and bicycles are allowed, i.e., sidewalks, bicycle paths, parks, etc. Segways can be rented for city tours in cities of Zagreb, Split and Dubrovnik.

=== Czech Republic ===
==== Legal status ====
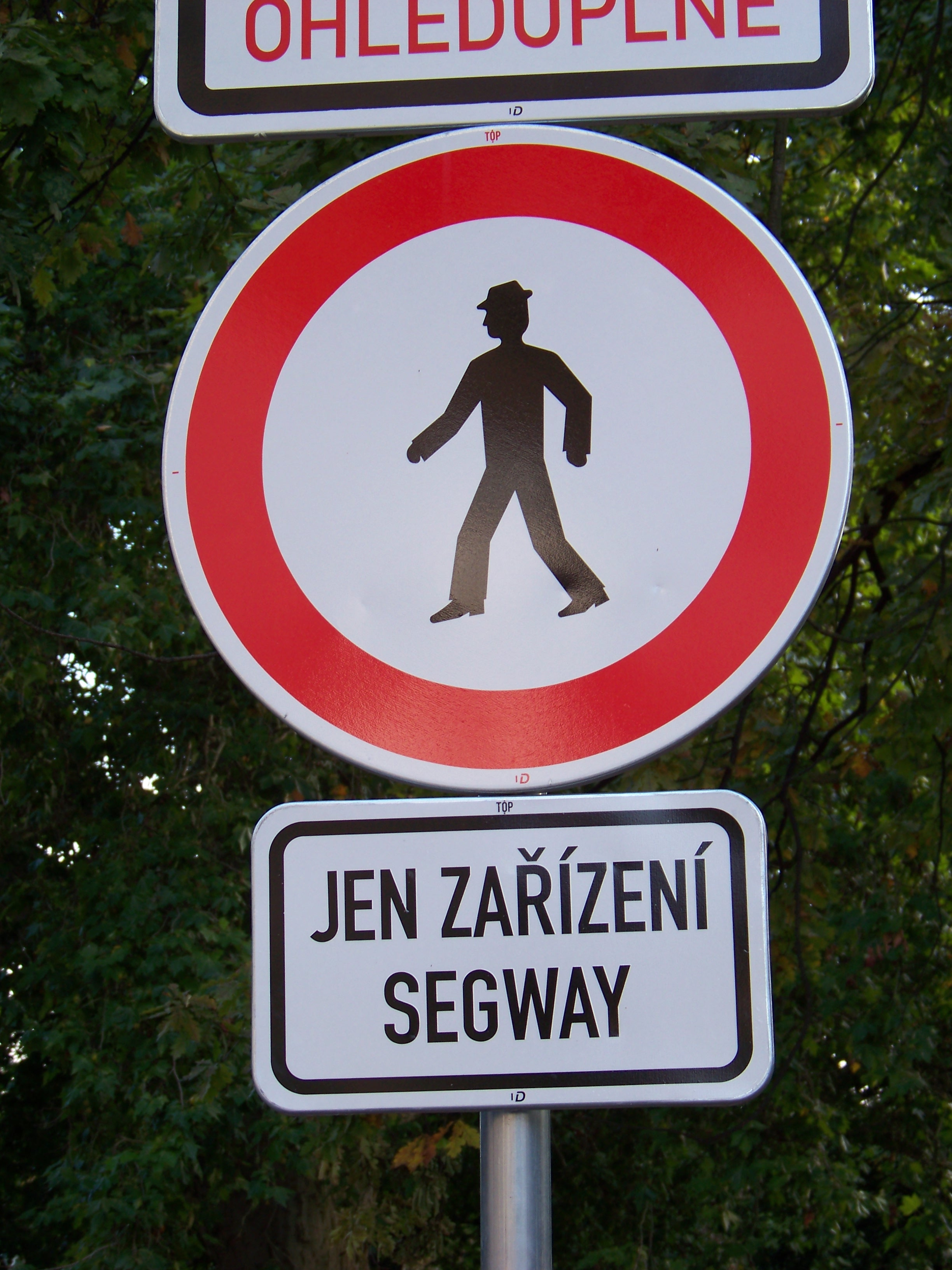
Before 2016, the Ministry of Transport of the Czech Republic enforced the interpretation that Segway PTs fall under pedestrian status. This road sign forbids Segways but allows "normal" pedestrians on the path (the prohibition affects "Segway devices only" as a sort of pedestrians).

Until February 2016, legal status of Segway was controversial and unclear. At least since the autumn of 2010, the Ministry of Transport enforced the interpretation that a rider on the Segway is considered as a pedestrian (with possible reference to the legal definition of a pedestrian which mentions "persons on skis, rollerskates or other similar sport equipment" and with an uttered rationale that the device is quite ineligible to fulfil requirements for vehicles). The central Prague district Praha 1 and the city of Prague, supported by some of transport experts including academic Petr Moos, strongly opposed this interpretation. The ministry was preparing a legal change which would mention PT Segway and skateboards explicitly in the definition of a pedestrian (which should cover also unicycles and roller shoes implicitly). The city of Prague proposed to bring PT transporter to the act as a quite new and special category of road traffic vehicles/participants.

The amendment act 48/2016 Sb., in force since 20 February 2016, defines a new strange term "osobní technický prostředek" (= personal technical device/medium) for "personal transporter with selfbalancing device" and "other similar devices". However, the text of the act uses the term "osobní přepravník" ("personal transporter") in that sense instead. The factual regulation is similar to users of skis and rollerskates, i.e. they fall under rules for pedestrians and in addition, they can use cyclist lanes and cyclist paths. Compared to rollerskates, PTs have their speed limited to "speed of walking" at walkways. Municipality can restrict their traffic by municipal decree, but such a restriction needs to be marked by road signs. Since 21 March 2016, a new ordinance of the Ministry of Transport, 84/2016 Sb., which introduced several new road signs, is in force:

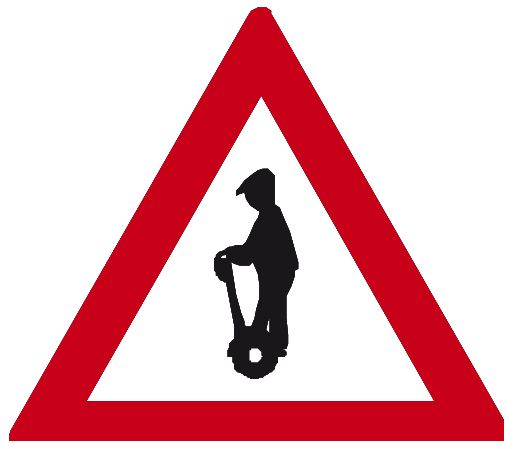
A 12c Osoby na osobních přepravnících (Persons on personal transporters)

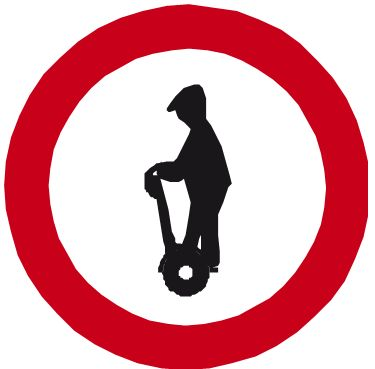
B 30a Zákaz vjezdu osob na osobních přepravnících (Entry of persons on personal transporters prohibited)

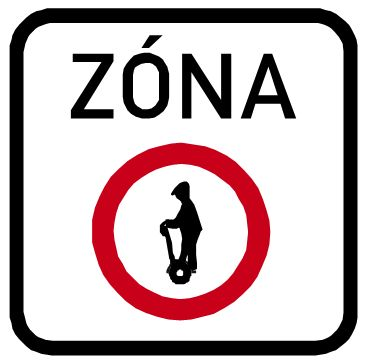
IZ 8a Zóna s dopravním omezením (Zone with traffic restriction - a variant example of the sign)

Kick scooters are explicitly considered as bicycles by law. Personal transporters which are not "self-balancing" are not treated specifically.

===== Usage =====
Map of PT prohibition in the center of Prague since 2 August 2016

Segways are used by municipal police corps in several cities as Prague, Plzeň, Olomouc, Karlovy Vary, Znojmo and Slaný. Since 2014, ambulance Segway is used by the private rescue service Trans Hospital.

Owners and operators of rental Segway transporters are associated in the "Asociace Segway ČR" which had 9 members in August 2014, all their rental shops are in the centre of Prague. In October 2012, this association prescribed rules for its members which contain a list of prohibited hazardous frequented localities. Some other operators are not associated and don't respect the rules. Metro daily newspaper in a May 2015 article presented an estimate that there are ca 300 Segways in Prague streets. However, since November 2016, Segways are prohibited in the broader centre of Prague.

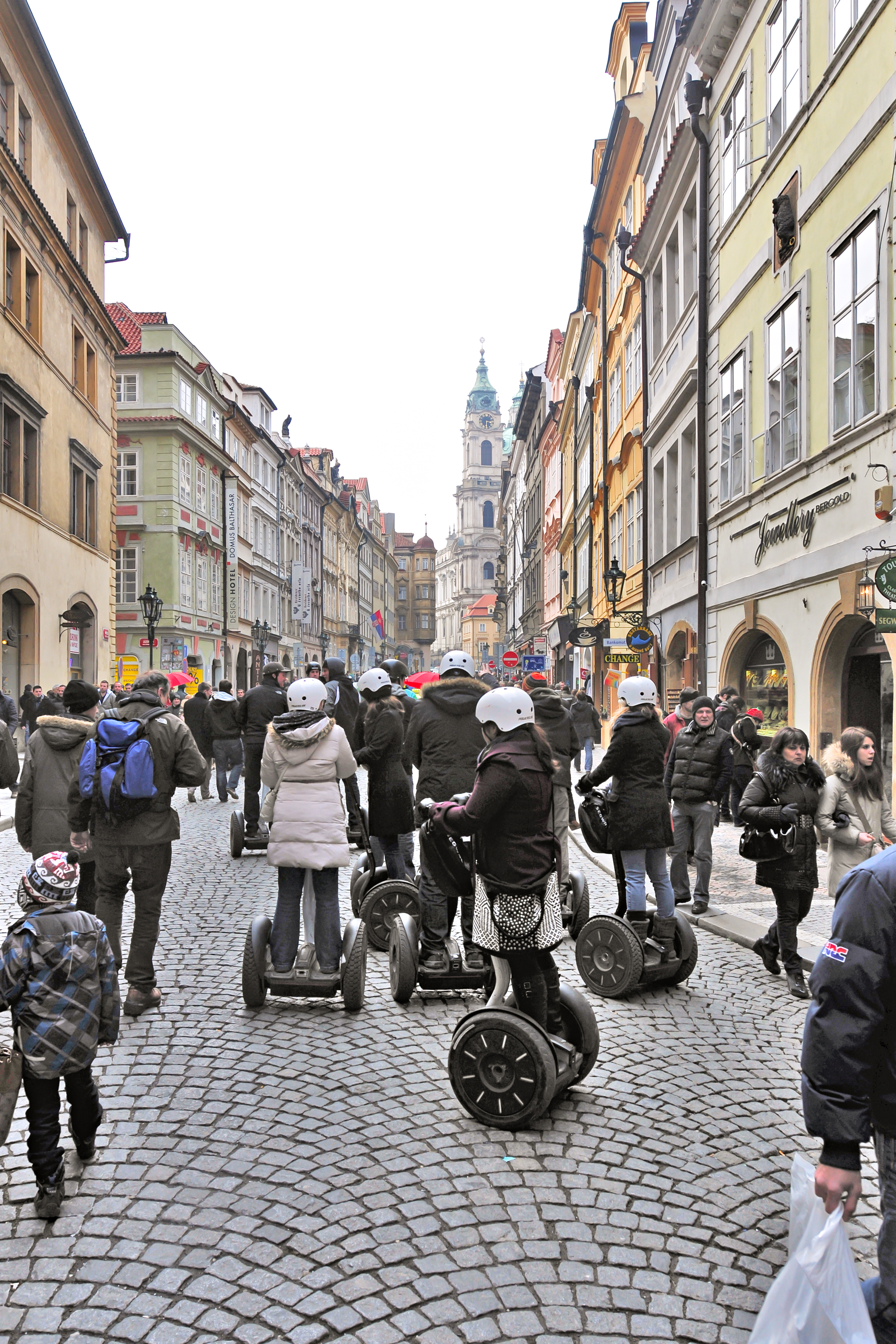
Tourists on Segways in Prague, March 2013

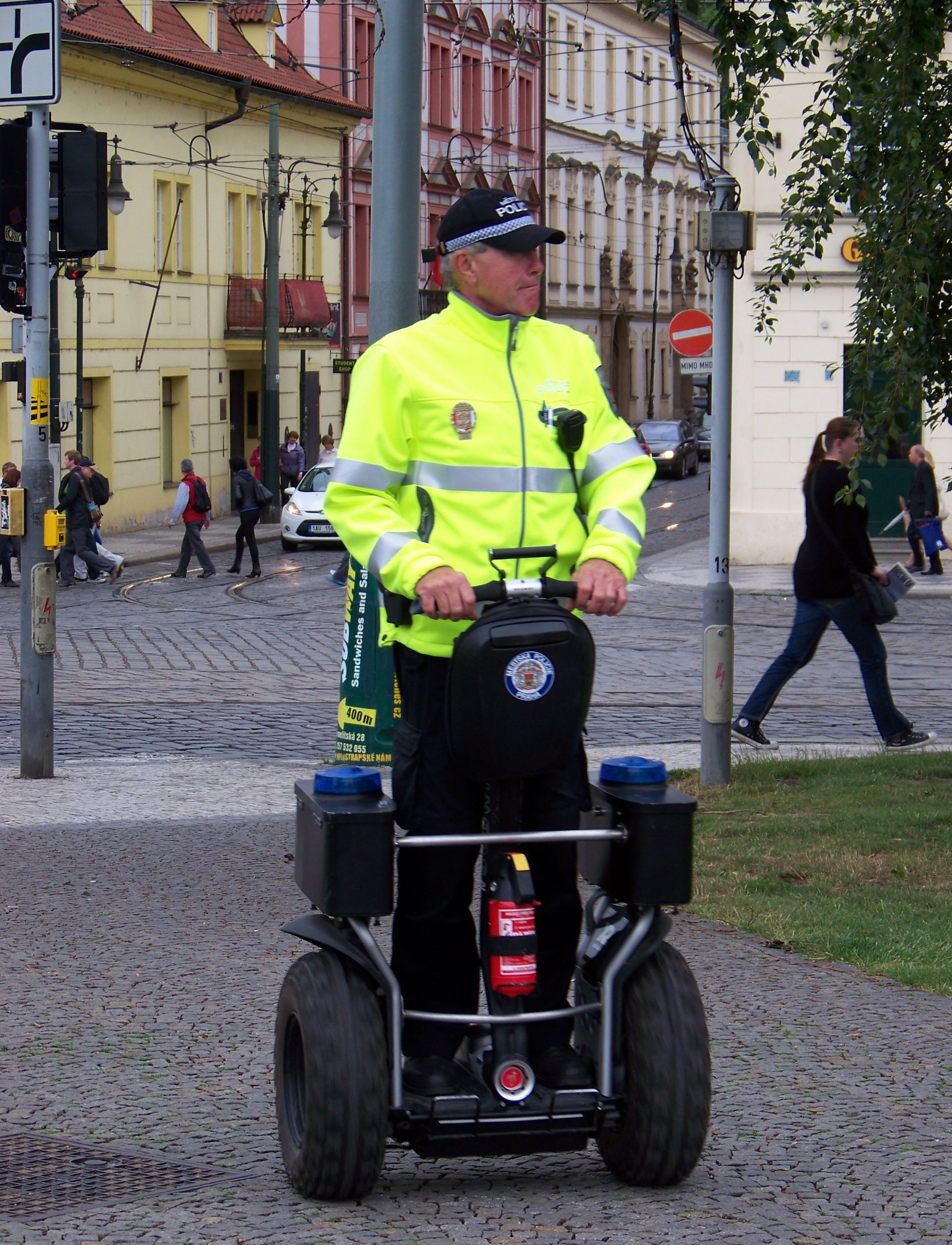
Prague Municipal Police officer on Segway

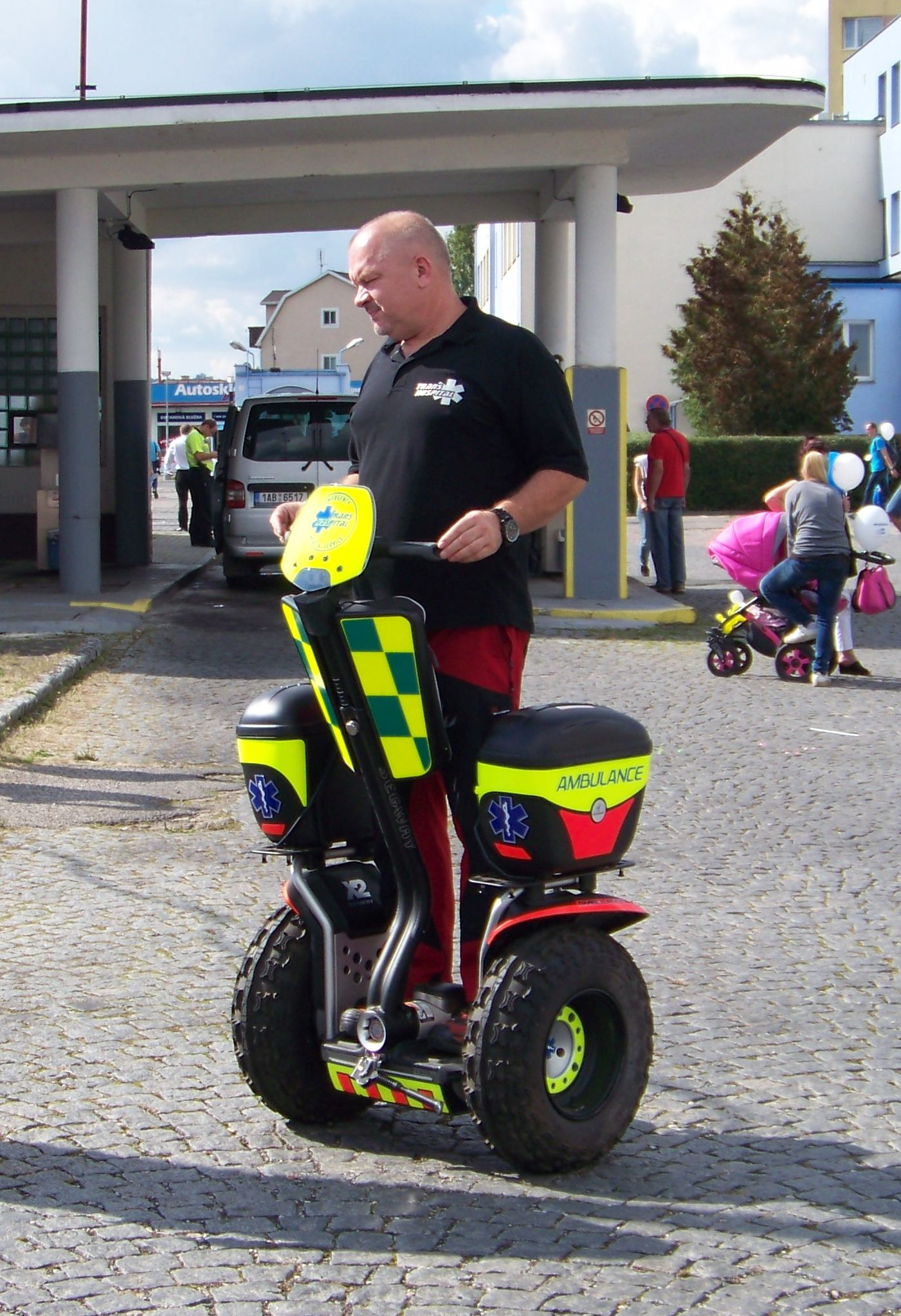
Ambulance Segway PT is used by the small private rescue service Trans Hospital from Řevnice, Czech Republic, since 2014. It is intended for use at festivals, concerts and similar events.

==== Local restrictions ====
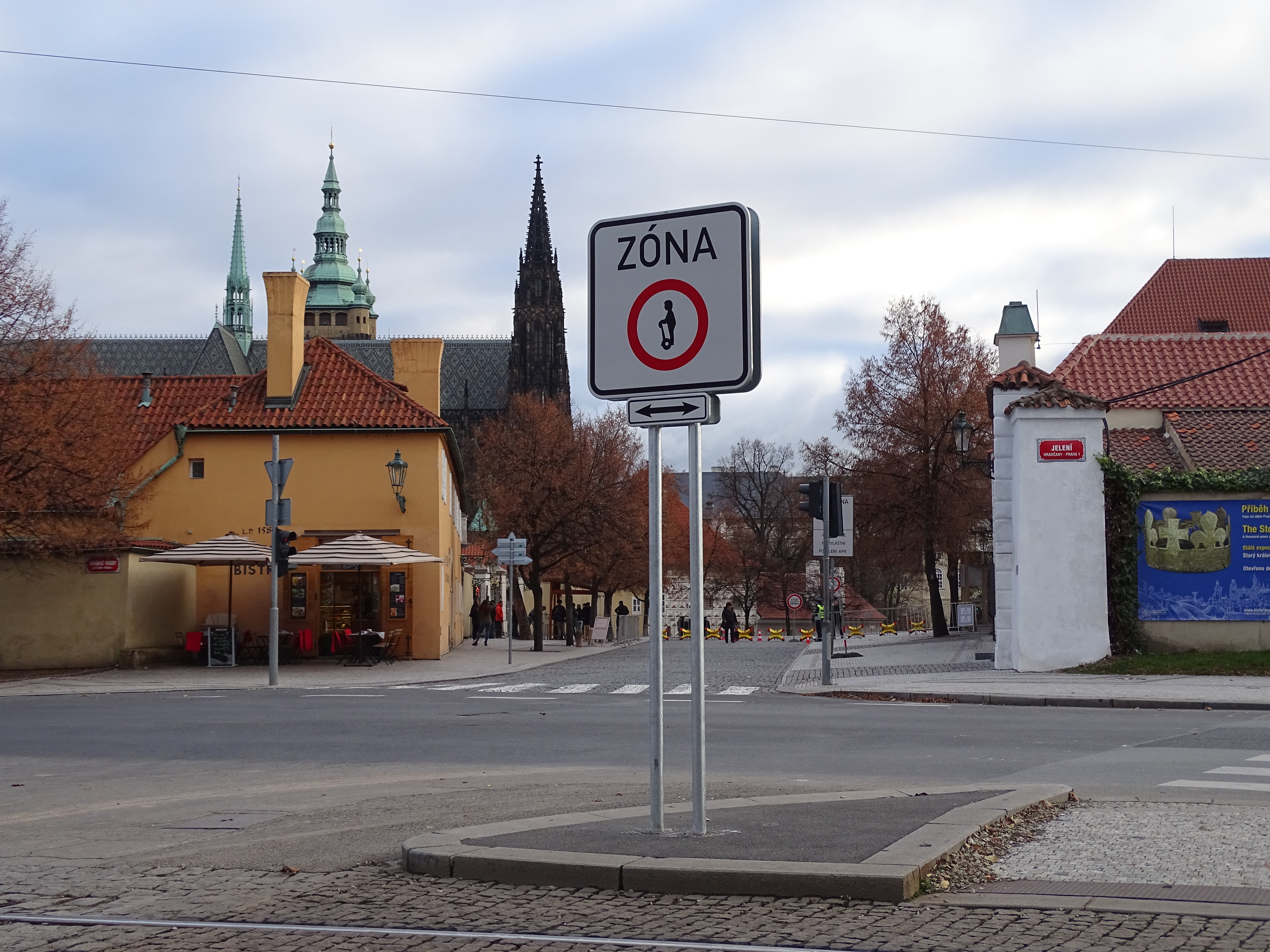
No Segway zone sign near the Prague Castle

Massive usage of Segways, as well as restrictions, are still limited to the area of the broader centre of Prague.

On 15 September 2014 Praha 1 placed to the Kampa park the first Czech road signs which prohibit entrance of Segways. The sign consisted of the message "No entrance for pedestrians" with an additional text sign "JEN ZAŘÍZENÍ SEGWAY" (only Segway devices). These signs were criticized by media and by the Ministry of Transport as confusing and incomprehensible.

Praha 1 prohibited for Segways also the passage of Richter House between Michalská street and Little Square at the Old Town, in 2015 or earlier. Unofficial marking on the floor was used for this prohibition.

In July 2015, Praha 2 prohibited Segways in the area of Vyšehrad Fortress. A round sign with the text "SEGWAY" inside was used.

Since 15 August 2015, the director general of the National Library prohibited Segway riding in the area of Clementinum in Prague Old Town, however Segways were allowed to be led from the side. Similarly, Segways were prohibited in the area of the Tyrš House at Malá Strana, the main building of the Czech organization of Sokol.

On the grounds of new legal definitions and authorization, on 19 July 2016, the Prague Council approved a decree (in force since 3 August 2016) that Segways (strictly speaking all "personal transporters" as defined by law) are forbidden in the whole Prague Conservation Area (Old Town, New Town, Hradčany, Malá Strana, Josefov, Vyšehrad) as well as in a broad center of the city: the whole district of Prague 7 (Holešovice and part of Bubeneč including Stromovka Park), big part of Prague 4 (Nusle, Podolí, Braník, Krč, Michle), Karlín, parts of Žižkov and Vinohrady etc. However, the restriction became efficient after the prohibition road signs are installed. According to the marking project by TSK (the Prague road management organization), 610 zone signs were installed at 250 places, at the expense of 4 million CZK. Implementation of the marking should begin past the official comment procedure, in the second half of November 2016. However, the official information campaign "Segway No Way" started in August already. On 24 November 2016, the Magistrate gave its decision about the signage and the first such sign was installed on 25 November 2016, the remaining in the next two weeks.

=== Denmark ===
The Segway PT is classified as a moped (knallert). As such vehicles must be fitted with lights, license plates and mechanical brakes, the Segway is effectively banned from public roads. A trial where the Segway would be classified as a bicycle has been announced running from 1 June 2010 to 1 April 2011. The trial was extended to 1 December 2011, and later to the end of 2014.

=== Finland ===
In September 2015 authorities in Finland recommended that personal transporters should be made legal for use on roads, making a distinction between devices with a maximum speed of 15 km/h (9.3 mph) which would be treated as pedestrians and ones with a maximum speed of 25 km/h (16 mph) which would be treated as bicycles.

Segway PTs are classified as low-power mopeds and therefore require license plates, effectively banning the use on public roads. On 31 March 2015, The Ministry of Transport and Communications of Finland started progress to propose changes to law to allow Segways under 25 km/h on sidewalks and reclassifying them as bicycles. Like bicycles, Segways would be required to include safety reflectors and a bell to alert pedestrians and the driver is required to wear a bicycle helmet.

=== France ===
In 2017, 284 people were injured by Personal transporter and 5 were killed.

Since 2019, France has specific regulations/laws for personal transporters.

Previously Segway PTs, also named "gyropode", were sometimes, but not always, considered as pedestrians and obey the same rules and laws. Nonetheless, Segways which do not have type certification to be driven as a motor vehicle are not part of any of the class of vehicle defined by the traffic code. For this reason, they have an unclear legal status.

Riders must go with the direction of traffic.

In Paris, e-scooter riders could be fined for riding on sidewalks (135 euros) or parking it antisocially (35 euros).

France introduced in 2019 a change in the Code de la route specific for the Personal transporter, depending on the speed the Personal transporter can reach. This new law

- forbids driving a Personal transporter outside built-up area (non-urban road) unless it is on a bicycle lane
- allows driving a Personal transporter within built-up area (urban road) but bicycle lane is mandatory if it exists
- forbids drivers of personal transporter speeds greater than 25 km/h
- makes mandatory lights, brakes, and horn
- forbids passengers
- forbids sidewalks.

=== Germany ===
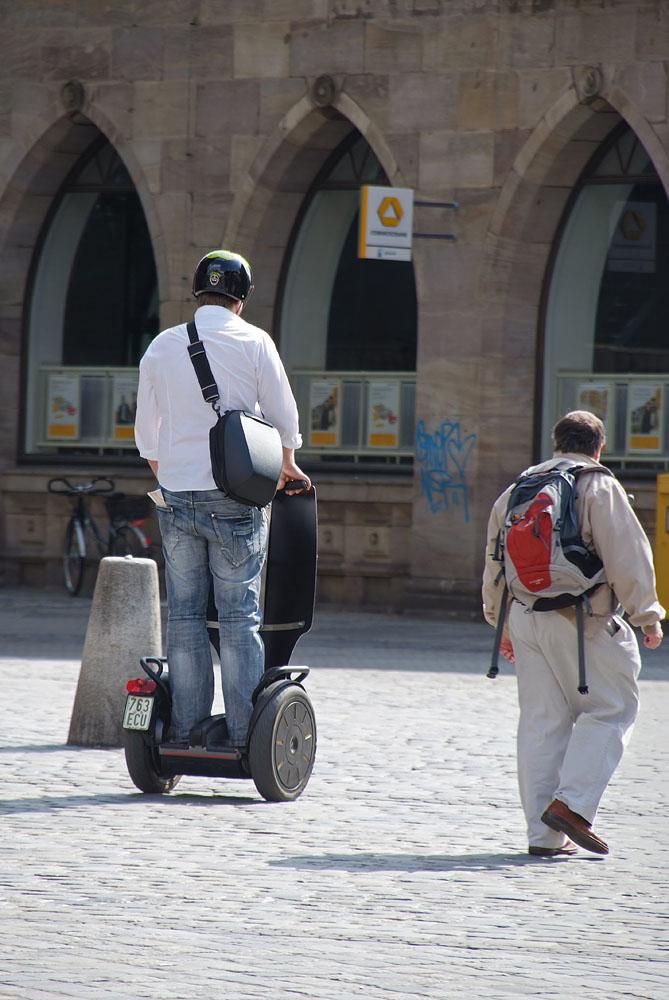
Segways in Germany have a red tail light and a vehicle registration plate.

In Germany self-balancing hoverboards are not allowed on public streets.

It is not legal to ride solowheels on public roads (includes sidewalks, parks, forest tracks, etc.) in Germany as of June 2017. Because it is considered as a type of motor vehicle the rider would need a test certificate from the Technical Inspection Agency (Technischer Überwachungsverein) to get insurance. Additionally, the driver would have to pay taxes according to the certificate. However, the Inspection Agency has no valid classification for it, no certificate can be obtained. Hence, riding a solowheel on public road would mean to ride without certificate, without insurance and to evade taxes. It may have severe penalties (up to one year in prison) when a solowheel rider is caught by the police. In contrast, for the Seqway as a two-wheeled vehicle with handlebar, there is a classification that allows to get a certificate and thus, the compulsory insurance.

The Segway PT i2 is generally allowed on bicycle paths and public roads within city limits since 25 July 2009. Outside city limits, the Segway may not be used on federal motorways, federal highways, state roads, and district roads. Bicycle lanes must be used if present. Riding a Segway on sidewalks and in pedestrian zones for city tours requires a special permit. The Segway is classified as an "electronic mobility aid", a new class of vehicle defined specifically for the Segway PT. Segways used on public roads must be equipped with front and rear lighting, reflectors, a bell, and an insurance plate.

=== Hungary ===
The Központi Közlekedési Főfelügyelet (Central Traffic Authority Board) does not consider Segways to be vehicle, and considers skateboarders, and people moving luggage trolleys pedestrians. Segway riders may use sidewalks and follow rules for pedestrians.

=== Ireland ===
Segway PTs are permitted in most public places. They are permitted in certain areas on bicycle paths around Dublin and Cork.

=== Italy ===
Use of a Segway PT is allowed within city limits wherever pedestrians or bicycles are allowed, i.e., sidewalks, bicycle paths, parks, etc.

==== Luxembourg ====
Segway PTs are legal on bicycle trails and roads. They are the equivalent to electric bicycles and obey the same rules and laws.

===== Netherlands =====
In the Netherlands the use of self-balancing hoverboards is illegal on all public roads; it is only allowed on private property. The main reason given is that the vehicle is motorized but has no steering wheel and no place to sit. Therefore, the vehicle does not fall in any category allowed on public roads.

In the Netherlands, any motorised skateboard is not permitted on public roads, including those driven by an electric motor.

In April 2008, the Dutch Government announced that it would ease the ban it had imposed in January 2007 that made it illegal to use a Segway PT on public roads in the Netherlands. Until recently, a tolerance policy was in place due to the inability of the authorities to classify the Segway as a vehicle. However, certain handicapped people, primarily heart and lung patients, are allowed to use the Segway, but only on the pavement. From 1 July 2008, anyone over the age of 16 is permitted to use a Segway on Dutch roads but users need to buy custom insurance. Amsterdam police officers are testing the Segway. In Rotterdam, the Segway has been used regularly by police officers and city watches.

=== Norway ===
Because of the top speed of 20 km/h, the Segway was classified as a moped in Norway. Prior to 2014, there were requirements for registration, insurance, age limit, drivers licenses and helmets to operate a Segway in the country. Therefore, Segways were not originally able to be used legally on public or private roads or on private property in Norway. Segways became legal in Norway on 1 July 2014 on all public roads with speed limits 20 km/h or less, sidewalks and bicycle lanes for ages 16 and older without requiring registration or insurance.

=== Poland ===
From 20 May 2021, regulations on the movement of personal transport devices and electric scooters will apply. They are included in Art. 33-33d of the Road Traffic Law. The driver of the personal transport device is obliged to use the cycle path if it is designated for the direction in which it is moving or intends to turn. The driver of the personal transport device, when using the path for bicycles and pedestrians, is obliged to exercise particular caution and give way to pedestrians. He may use the footpath or road where there is no cycle path. If he uses them, he is obliged to drive at a speed close to that of a pedestrian, exercise particular caution, give way to a pedestrian and not obstruct his movement.

=== Portugal ===
Segway PTs are legal on public paths from age 18 (and below, when accompanied by adults) as an equivalent to pedestrian traffic and are used by local police forces, and by Polícia Marítima] (a Navy unit), for beach patrolling. They are also used (rented) by tour operators across the country, and by shopping security guards.

=== Sweden ===
It was unlawful to use a Segway PT on any public road or pavement in Sweden until 18 December 2008 when the Segway was re-classified as a cykel klass II (class 2 bicycle). On 1 October 2010 the Segway and similar one person electrical vehicles were re-classified as bicycles.

As of September 1, 2022 it is no longer permitted to park the electric scooter on footpaths and cycle paths or to drive on footpaths and pavements.

=== Switzerland ===
In Switzerland, devices with a maximum speed of 25 km/h (16 mph) have an age limit of age 14 years with a licence, and 16 years without a licence.

The Segway PT is classified as a moped with usage of all bicycle circulation areas. Only the PT i2 and x2 (SE) has been approved for use in Switzerland, no NineBot Elite or mini Pro. Every self-balancing vehicle must be fully redundant. The PT may be used on roads provided that it is equipped with a Swiss Road Kit and a license plate. The Swiss Road Kit has front and back lighting, a battery source, and a license plate holder. Use on sidewalks and pedestrian zones is prohibited. An exception is made for handicapped individuals, who must obtain in advance a special authorization from the Swiss Federal Roads Office. The Segway PT i180 may also be registered for use on specific request. However, the PT i180 must be equipped with a left/right turn indicator system before it may be admitted for road use.

=== United Kingdom ===
In England and Wales use of these devices on a sidewalk is banned under Section 72 of the Highway Act 1835. With reference to its use of the carriageway it falls into the category of 'motor vehicle' (defined as 'a mechanically propelled vehicle, intended or adapted for use on roads' by section 136 of the Road Traffic Regulation Act 1984) (see) and as such would be covered by the Road Vehicles (Construction & Use) Regulations 1986 and hence approval through European Community Whole Vehicle Type Approval. The government has been petitioned to allow these devices on the road, and trials are currently being carried out in a restricted number of towns allowing the use of rental (but not privately owned) electric scooters. While in opposition in 2008, the Conservatives and Liberal Democrats lobbied the Labour Government to change the law to allow Segways to use public cycle lanes. In July 2010, a man was charged under the Highway Act 1835 in Barnsley for riding his Segway on the pavement, and was prosecuted and fined £75 in January 2011. His conviction was upheld by the High Court on appeal.

In Scotland, it is illegal to ride on public pavements (sidewalks) under the Roads Act, 1984.

== North America ==
=== Canada ===
In Toronto motorized vehicles are not allowed on sidewalks, except for mobility scooters for people who need them.

Restrictions on motorized vehicle use are set by provinces individually. In Alberta, Segway PTs cannot legally be driven on public roads including sidewalks abutting public roads. Segways cannot legally be driven on city-owned bicycle paths in Calgary. Segways are allowed on private land with the landowner's permission. In British Columbia, Segways cannot legally be operated on B.C. roads or on sidewalks because they cannot be licensed or insured as a vehicle in B.C. In Ontario, the Ministry of Transportation started a pilot program allowing Segways to be used by people 14 years or older with a disability, Canada Post door-to-door delivery personnel, and police officers. It was originally planned to end on 19 October 2011, but was extended by two years, and then extended again an additional five years (to 19 October 2018), due to limited participation. Prior to the end of the pilot program, the Ministry of Transportation will assess the data and information gathered from the pilot decide whether to allow Segways and how to legislate them.

=== United States ===
In California, as of 1 January 2016 'electrically motorized boards' can be used by those over 16 years old at speeds of up to 15 miles per hour (24 km/h) on streets where the speed limit is under 35 miles per hour (56 km/h) as long as they wear a helmet and comply with drive/drug laws. Boards must be speed limited to 20 miles per hour (32 km/h), be designed for the transport of one person and have a power of less than 1000 watts. Use of these devices on the sidewalk is left to cities and counties to decide. Having monitored this new law for 5 years, California Highway Patrol will submit a final report to the legislature in 2021. University of California, Los Angeles included Hoverboards in a general restriction on the use of bicycles, scooters and skateboards using walkways and hallways in November 2015.

In New York City, self-balancing hoverboards are banned under existing legislation; however, community advocates are working with lawmakers to legalize their use but there is no current explanation from the lawmakers relating to electric skateboards.

The Segway PT has been banned from use on sidewalks and in public transportation in a few municipalities and the company has challenged bans and sought exemption from sidewalk restrictions in over 30 states. Advocacy groups for pedestrians and the blind in the US have been critical of Segway PT use: America Walks and the American Council of the Blind oppose allowing people, even those with disabilities, to drive the Segway PT on sidewalks and have actively lobbied against any such legislation. Today, Segways are allowed on sidewalks in most states, though local municipalities may forbid them. Many states also allow them on bicycle lanes or on roads with speed limits of up to 25 mph (40 km/h).

In 2011, the U.S. government Department of Justice—amending regulations that implement title II of the Americans with Disabilities Act (ADA)—ruled that the Segway is an "other power-driven mobility device" and its use must be permitted unless the covered entity can demonstrate that users cannot operate the class of devices in accordance with legitimate safety requirements.

A fact sheet published by the US Justice Department states: "People with mobility, circulatory, respiratory, or neurological disabilities use many kinds of devices for mobility. Some use walkers, canes, crutches, or braces. Some use manual or power wheelchairs or electric scooters. In addition, advances in technology have given rise to new devices, such as Segways that some people with disabilities use as mobility devices, including many veterans injured while serving in the military. And more advanced devices will inevitably be invented, providing more mobility options for people with disabilities." There is some allowance in only some very specific circumstances where usage would be considered unsafe. Semi-ambulatory Americans have previously benefitted from Segway use, even in New York City. Segs4Vets provides Segway PTs to permanently injured military veterans.

San Francisco banned the Segway PT from sidewalks over safety concerns in 2002. The District of Columbia categorizes Segways as a "personal mobility device" which means Segway users follow D.C.'s bicycle laws, which do not require Segway users to wear helmets and other protective gear. Users are not allowed to wear headphones with the exception of hearing aids or other devices that only require the use of one ear.

=== Mexico ===
In Mexico there is no regulation that limits Segway use in public spaces.

== Oceania ==
=== Australia ===
The authorities stated in late 2015 that self-balancing hoverboards must not be ridden on the carriageway or sidewalk in the state of New South Wales since they are categorised as motor vehicles but don't comply with any existing vehicle class. They did also say that "our road safety experts in the Centre for Road Safety are currently working with their counterparts across the country on national laws and safety standards for these personal electric transport devices, so we can figure out how and where people can use them safely". Other states in Australia have yet to make a clear decision or announcement on legality and enforcement, and are relying on existing laws in place. They are free to use on private property.

In Australia laws are determined at the state & territory level, each differing in their adoption of the Australian Road Rules. It is generally illegal to use Segway PTs in public places and on roads throughout Australia.

In the Australian Capital Territory, use of Segways is illegal on roads and other public places, but, as of June 2012, was permitted around Canberra's Lake Burley Griffin and other tourist attractions, subject to training, safety equipment and speed limit requirements.

In New South Wales, the Segway has been confirmed by the Roads & Traffic Authority as being illegal on both roads and footpaths. "In simple terms, riders are way too exposed to mix with general traffic on a road and too fast, heavy and consequently dangerous to other users on footpaths or cycle paths." Although this does not render them totally illegal (they may still, for example, be used on private property), their uses are limited enough that they are not sold to the general public. As of 2024, all forms of personal transporter are illegal for personal use in public areas such as roads, footpaths, parks, bike paths, shared paths etc.

In Queensland, the use of the Segway became legal on 1 August 2013. Queensland transport Minister Scott Emerson noted that it makes sense for Segways to be allowed on public paths across Queensland, given users wear helmets.

In Western Australia, the law enables Electric Personal Transporters (EPT) (Segways) to be used as part of a supervised commercial tour, being run by an operator that holds the appropriate approvals. You may use an EPT on private property. Tour operators should approach the Local Authority where they wish to operate the tour. Local authorities have ultimate responsibility for approving tour operators within their respective areas.

=== New Zealand ===
In New Zealand the Segway PT is classed as a mobility device, in the same category as a mobility scooter or electric wheelchair. Mobility Devices must be ridden on footpaths where possible, at a speed that does not endanger others, and give way to pedestrians. This ruling might not be consistently applied: in 2011, police in Taupō had to stop using Segways because there is no separate vehicle classification that applies to them, requiring their registration as roadworthy in the same manner as cars.
