= Unicycle robot =

Robotic unicycle or unicycle robot can mean:

- a self-balancing unicycle
- a unicycle cart, an idealised two-wheeled robot cart moving in a two-dimensional world, used as an example in control theory problems
