= Furuta pendulum =

Type of pendulum

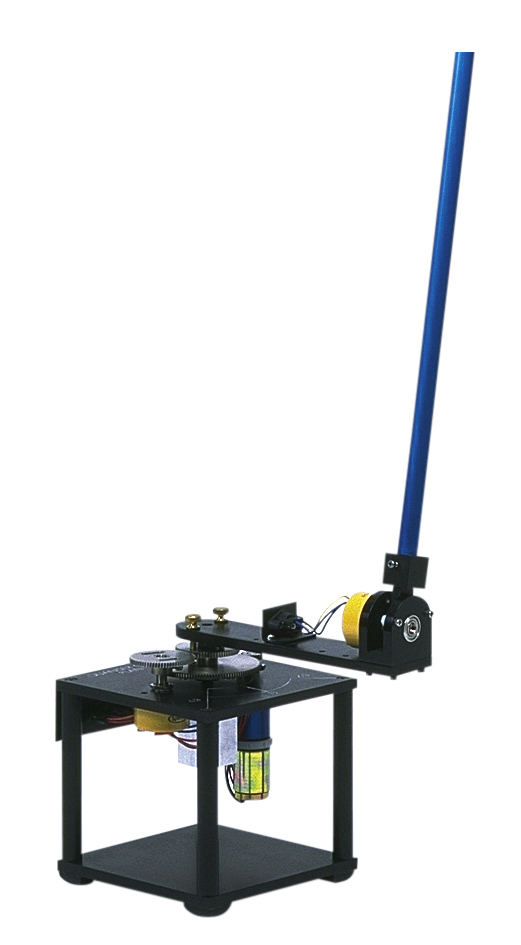
Rotational Inverted Pendulum: Classic pedagogical example of application of control theory

The Furuta pendulum, or rotational inverted pendulum, consists of a driven arm which rotates in the horizontal plane and a pendulum attached to that arm which is free to rotate in the vertical plane. It was invented in 1992 at Tokyo Institute of Technology by Katsuhisa Furuta and his colleagues. It is an example of a complex nonlinear oscillator of interest in control system theory. The pendulum is underactuated and extremely non-linear due to the gravitational forces and the coupling arising from the Coriolis and centripetal forces. Since then, dozens, possibly hundreds of papers and theses have used the system to demonstrate linear and non-linear control laws. The system has also been the subject of two texts.

== Equations of motion ==
Despite the great deal of attention the system has received, very few publications successfully derive (or use) the full dynamics. Many authors have only considered the rotational inertia of the pendulum for a single principal axis (or neglected it altogether). In other words, the inertia tensor only has a single non-zero element (or none), and the remaining two diagonal terms are zero. It is possible to find a pendulum system where the moment of inertia in one of the three principal axes is approximately zero, but not two.

A few authors have considered slender symmetric pendulums where the moments of inertia for two of the principal axes are equal and the remaining moment of inertia is zero. Of the dozens of publications surveyed for this wiki only a single conference paper and journal paper were found to include all three principal inertial terms of the pendulum. Both papers used a Lagrangian formulation but each contained minor errors (presumably typographical).

The equations of motion presented here are an extract from a paper on the Furuta pendulum dynamics derived at the University of Adelaide.

=== Definitions ===
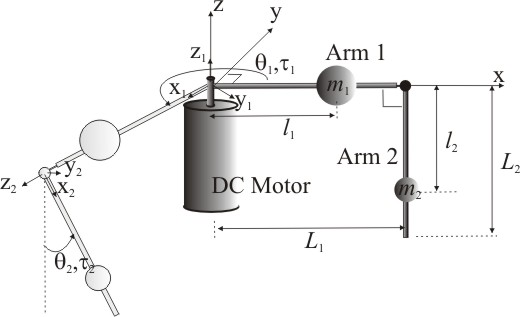
Fig. 1: Schematic of the single rotary inverted pendulum system.

Consider the rotational inverted pendulum mounted to a DC motor as shown in Fig. 1. The DC motor is used to apply a torque $\tau_1$ to Arm 1. The link between Arm 1 and Arm 2 is not actuated but free to rotate. The two arms have lengths $L_1$ and $L_2$. The arms have masses $m_1$ and $m_2$ which are located at $l_1$ and $l_2$ respectively, which are the lengths from the point of rotation of the arm to its center of mass. The arms have inertia tensors $\boldsymbol{J}_1$ and $\boldsymbol{J}_2$ (about the centre of mass of the arms respectively). Each rotational joint is viscously damped with damping coefficients $b_1$ and $b_2$, where $b_1$ is the damping provided by the motor bearings and $b_2$ is the damping arising from the pin coupling between Arm 1 and Arm 2.

A right hand coordinate system has been used to define the inputs, states and the Cartesian coordinate systems 1 and 2. The coordinate axes of Arm 1 and Arm 2 are the principal axes such that the inertia tensors are diagonal.

The angular rotation of Arm 1, $\theta_1$, is measured in the horizontal plane where a counter-clockwise direction (when viewed from above) is positive. The angular rotation of Arm 2, $\theta_2$, is measured in the vertical plane where a counter-clockwise direction (when viewed from the front) is positive. When the Arm is hanging down in the stable equilibrium position $\theta_2=0$ .

The torque the servo-motor applies to Arm 1, $\tau_1$, is positive in a counter-clockwise direction (when viewed from above). A disturbance torque, $\tau_2$, is experienced by Arm 2, where a counter-clockwise direction (when viewed from the front) is positive.

=== Assumptions ===
Before deriving the dynamics of the system a number of assumptions must be made. These are:

- The motor shaft and Arm 1 are assumed to be rigidly coupled and infinitely stiff.
- Arm 2 is assumed to be infinitely stiff.
- The coordinate axes of Arm1 and Arm 2 are the principal axes such that the inertia tensors are diagonal.
- The motor rotor inertia is assumed to be negligible. However, this term may be easily added to the moment of inertia of Arm 1.
- Only viscous damping is considered. All other forms of damping (such as Coulomb) have been neglected, however it is a simple exercise to add this to the final governing DE.

=== Non-linear Equations of Motion ===
The non-linear equations of motion are given by

$\ddot{\theta}_1 \left(J_{1zz} + m_1 l_1^2 + m_2 L_1^2 + (J_{2yy} + m_2 l_2^2)\sin^2(\theta_2) + J_{2xx}\cos^2(\theta_2) \right) + \ddot{\theta}_2 m_2 L_1 l_2 \cos(\theta_2) - m_2 L_1 l_2 \sin(\theta_2) \dot{\theta}_2^2 +\dot{\theta}_1 \dot{\theta}_2 \sin(2 \theta_2) (m_2 l_2^2 + J_{2yy} - J_{2xx}) +b_1 \dot{\theta}_1 = \tau_1$

and

$\ddot{\theta}_1 m_2 L_1 l_2 \cos(\theta_2) +\ddot{\theta}_2 (m_2 l_2^2 + J_{2zz}) + 1/2 \dot{\theta}_1^2 \sin(2 \theta_2) ( -m_2 l_2^2 - J_{2yy} + J_{2xx} ) +b_2 \dot{\theta}_2 +g m_2 l_2 \sin(\theta_2) = \tau_2$

=== Simplifications ===
Most Furuta pendulums tend to have long slender arms, such that the moment of inertia along the axis of the arms is negligible. In addition, most arms have rotational symmetry such that the moments of inertia in two of the principal axes are equal. Thus, the inertia tensors may be approximated as follows:

$\boldsymbol{J}_1 = diag[J_{1xx},J_{1yy},J_{1zz}] = diag[0,J_{1},J_{1}]$

$\boldsymbol{J}_2 = diag[J_{2xx},J_{2yy},J_{2zz}] = diag[0,J_{2},J_{2}]$

Further simplifications are obtained by making the following substitutions. The total moment of inertia of Arm 1 about the pivot point (using the parallel axis theorem) is $\hat{J_1} = J_1 +m_1l_1^2$. The total moment of inertia of Arm 2 about its pivot point is $\hat{J_2} = J_2 +m_2l_2^2$. Finally, define the total moment of inertia the motor rotor experiences when the pendulum (Arm 2) is in its equilibrium position (hanging vertically down), $\hat{J_0} = \hat{J}_1 +m_2L_1^2 = J_1 +m_1l_1^2 + m_2L_1^2$.

Substituting the previous definitions into the governing DEs gives the more compact form

$\ddot{\theta}_1 \left(\hat{J_0} + \hat{J_2}\sin^2(\theta_2) \right) + \ddot{\theta}_2 m_2 L_1 l_2 \cos(\theta_2) - m_2 L_1 l_2 \sin(\theta_2) \dot{\theta}_2^2 +\dot{\theta}_1 \dot{\theta}_2 \sin(2 \theta_2)\hat{J_2} +b_1 \dot{\theta}_1 = \tau_1$

and

$\ddot{\theta}_1 m_2 L_1 l_2 \cos(\theta_2) +\ddot{\theta}_2 \hat{J_2} - 1/2 \dot{\theta}_1^2 \sin(2 \theta_2) \hat{J_2} +b_2 \dot{\theta}_2 +g m_2 l_2 \sin(\theta_2) = \tau_2$

== See also ==
- Inverted pendulum
- Double inverted pendulum
- Inertia wheel pendulum
- Self-balancing unicycle
