= Double inverted pendulum =

Type of pendulum

a schematic of a double inverted pendulum

A double inverted pendulum is the combination of the inverted pendulum and the double pendulum. The system consists of two rigid rods connected in series by rotational joints, with the lower joint attached to a base. The pendulum has 2 degrees of freedom. The double inverted pendulum is unstable, meaning that it will fall down unless it is controlled in some way. The two main methods of controlling a double inverted pendulum are moving the base, as with the inverted pendulum, or by applying a torque at the pivot point between the two pendulums.

== See also ==
- Inverted pendulum
- Double pendulum
- Inertia wheel pendulum
- Furuta pendulum
- Tuned mass damper
