= Segway Inc. =

Chinese-acquired American maker of self-balancing personal transporters

- Type: Subsidiary
- Industry: Personal transporters and robotics
- Founded: July 27, 1999; 27 years ago
- Founder: Dean Kamen
- Headquarters: Beijing, China
- Key people: Wang Ye (CEO); Dean L. Kamen (Founder); Alex Chen Huang (President); Tony Ho (US Vice President Robotics and Business Development); Gao Lufeng (Chairman)
- Owner: Ninebot
- Website: www.segway.com

Segway Inc. is a Chinese-owned, formerly American manufacturer of two-wheeled personal transporters, chiefly through its Segway PT and Segway miniPro product lines. Founded by inventor Dean Kamen in 1999, the company's name is a homophone of the word "segue".

Segway Inc. was headquartered in the town of Bedford, New Hampshire, United States, and primarily marketed its products to various niche markets, including police departments, military bases, warehouses, corporate campuses, and industrial sites. It has held some key patents on designs for self-balancing personal transporters, although some of them have since expired. Since the Chinese company Ninebot acquired it in 2015, Segway has focused on developing a stronger presence in the consumer market with smaller products such as the Segway miniPro.

== History ==
=== Origin ===
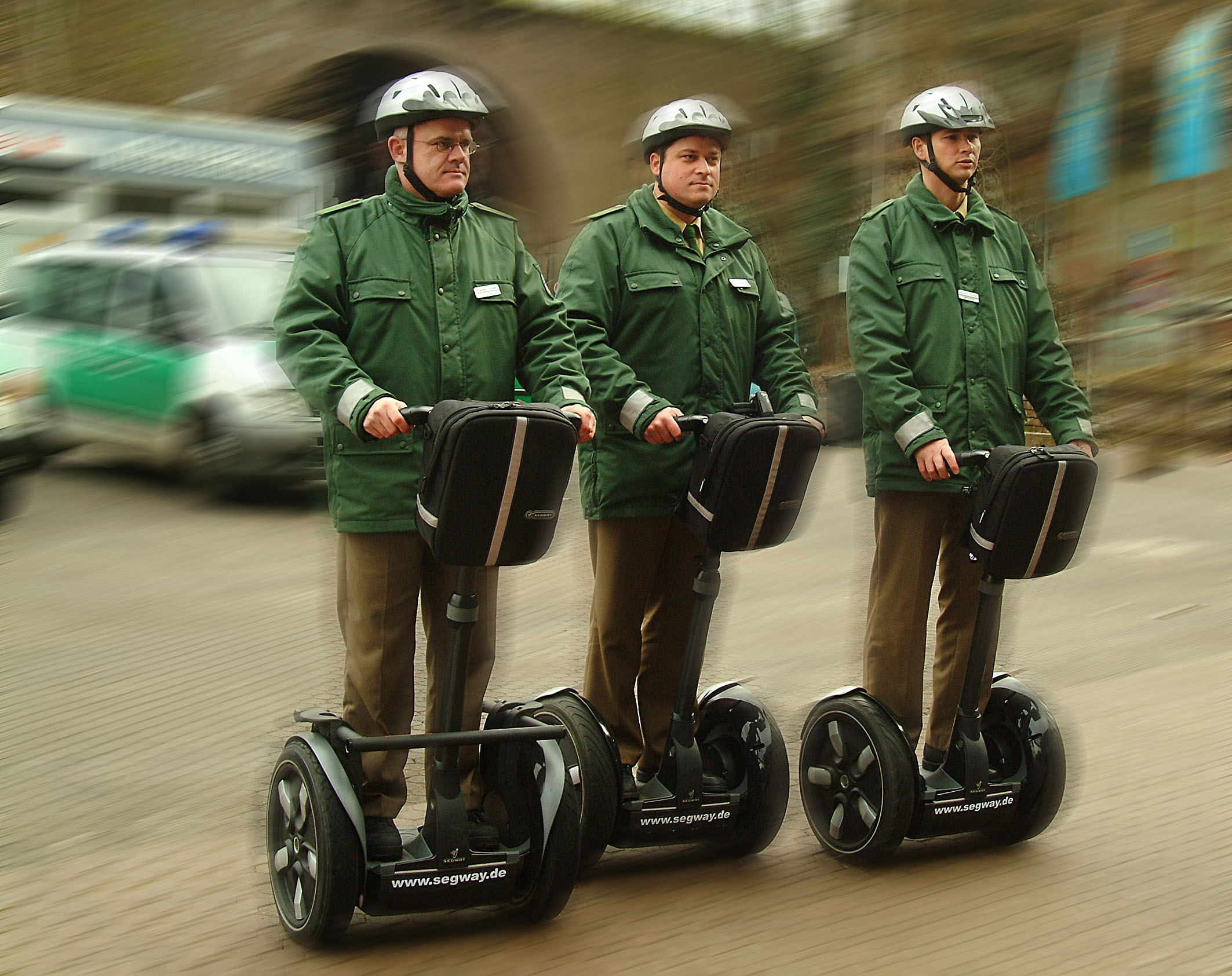
Segway used by three policemen in Germany

The first patent by Dean Kamen for a self-balancing transportation device was filed on February 23, 1993, and granted on December 30, 1997, in relation to the iBOT, a self-balancing wheelchair which he developed at DEKA, a company that he had founded in 1982. That patent has since expired, although it was followed by various others, and some patents assigned to the company have not yet expired (as of early 2019).

Development of the iBOT started in 1990 with the first working prototypes available in 1992. In late 1994, DEKA signed a deal with Johnson & Johnson to manufacture the unit, with Johnson & Johnson paying for all subsequent R&D with DEKA received a smaller royalty fee than normal in return for their retaining rights to all non-medical applications of the technology. The iBOT was revealed to the public on Dateline NBC in a segment by John Hockenberry on June 30, 1999.

=== Independent years ===
Segway Inc. was founded in July 1999 to develop non-medical applications for the self-balancing technology, and the Segway PT, a two-wheeled personal transporter, was launched in December 2001, with first deliveries to customers in early 2002.

When it was launched in December 2001, the annual sales target was 40,000 units, and the company expected to sell 50,000 to 100,000 units in the first 13 months. By 2003, the company had sold 6,000 units, and by September 2006 approximately 23,500, when all units sold up to that point were recalled due to a software glitch that could cause the units to reverse, potentially causing riders to fall off. In a March 2009 interview, a company official said the firm "has shipped over 50,000" Segway PTs.

Segway Inc's investors remained optimistic. Dean Kamen predicted that the Segway "will be to the car what the car was to the horse and buggy" and John Doerr, a venture capitalist who invested in the company, predicted that Segway Inc would be the fastest company to reach US$1 billion in sales.

By 2007, cumulative sales were 30,000 units. Critics pointed to Segway Inc's silence over its financial performance as an indication that the company was still not profitable, following expenditure of some US$100 million developing the Segway PT.

In 2009, General Motors announced that it was building a prototype two-seat electric vehicle with Segway. An early prototype of the Personal Urban Mobility and Accessibility vehicle, dubbed Project P.U.M.A., was demonstrated in New York a day ahead of the press previews for the 2009 New York International Auto Show. At Expo 2010 in Shanghai, the successor was presented, the "EN-V project".

James Norrod served as the President and Chief Executive Officer of Segway Inc. from April 2005 to January 2010 and steered the sale of the company to a group led by British millionaire Jimi Heselden, chairman of Hesco Bastion in December 2009. After the sale, Dean Kamen was no longer involved with the company. Ten months after buying the company, Heselden died after accidentally driving a Segway off a cliff in West Yorkshire.

In February 2013, Summit Strategic Investments, LLC, announced it had acquired the company for $9 million, saying that it planned to refocus, grow its product portfolio and expand its worldwide network. In September 2014, Segway filed a complaint with the United States International Trade Commission about the infringement of several of its patents by several Chinese companies, including Ninebot, Shenzhen INMOTION Technologies and Robstep Robot. Two years later, on April 1, 2015, Summit Strategic Investments sold the company for more than $75 million.

=== Subsidiary of Ninebot ===
On April 1, 2015, Segway was acquired by Ninebot Inc., a Beijing-based transportation robotics startup that had raised $80M USD from Xiaomi and Sequoia Capital.

In May 2016, it was announced that the Segway miniPRO, a smaller self-balancing scooter, would be launched in June that year.

In June 2018, after initially announcing that production of the Segway PT would move from Bedford, New Hampshire, to China, the company decided to keep most of its production in its New Hampshire facility.

On July 15, 2020, Ninebot ceased production of the Segway PT and laid off the 21 employees working at the Bedford, New Hampshire, plant.

Segway-Ninebot's product portfolio includes electric scooters, e-bikes, powersports vehicles, and consumer robotics.

=== Pivot to E-bikes and becoming major shareholder of Sur-ron ebikes ===
In 2019, Sur-Ron, a privately held company, announced major investments from Segway with plans to design an ebike for Segway and off-road motorcycles. The Segway dirt e-bike model x260 and x160 were officially revealed at the SEMA 2019 show.

=== Robotic mower ===
In 2021, Segway introduced the Navimow, an autonomous robotic lawn mower which operates using GPS, eliminating the need for perimeter wiring. The company introduced its X3 mower in January 2025.

== Products ==
As of August 2018:

Products branded 'Segway'

- Segway i2 SE (professional self-balancing scooter for use in warehouses and other locations)
- Segway x2 SE (ruggedised self-balancing scooter for use on most challenging terrain)
- Segway SE 3 (three-wheeled standup e-scooter for professional use)
- Segway Robot (autonomous robot based on the Segway mini plus)
- Segway Drift W1 (self-balancing rollerblades)

Products branded 'Ninebot by Segway'

- Self-Balancing Vehicle
  - Ninebot by Segway E+ (self-balancing scooter for general use)
  - Ninebot by Segway miniPro (smaller self-balancing scooter for general use, controlled by a 'knee control bar')
  - Ninebot S (2019 similar to miniPro)
  - Ninebot S+ (2019 larger version of the Ninebot S)
  - Segway S2 Ninebot
- Electric Unicycle
  - Ninebot One S2 (latest generation self-balancing unicycle)
  - Ninebot One E+ (earlier model of self-balancing unicycle)
- Electric Kick Scooter
  - Ninebot by Segway ES1/ES2/ES4 (a series of electric kick-scooters). An ES4 is essentially an ES2 with external battery attached.
  - Ninebot by Segway Max
  - Ninebot by Segway F20A/F30/F40
  - Segway Air T15E
  - Segway P100SE
  - Segway P65E
  - Segway D 18E/28E/38E
  - Segway F2 E II/Pro E II
  - Segway F3/F3 E/ F3 Pro E
  - Segway F65
  - Segway F 25I/25E II/30E/40I/40E
  - Segway GT 1/1E/2/2P Series
  - Segway GT3/GT3 E/GT3 Pro
  - Segway E-SK8 Shredder Kit (4 wheel scooter)
  - Segway ES1LD
  - Segway E 45E/25E/22E
  - Segway Max G30 P/LP/E II/LE II
  - Segway Ninebot F2/F2 Pro
  - Segway Ninebot Max G2/G3/G3 E
  - Segway Ninebot E2/E2 E/E2 Plus/E2 Plus-II/E2 Pro/E3 E/E3 Pro E
  - Segway C2/C2 Lite/C2 Pro (Kids Electric Scooter)
  - Segway ZING C 8/C10/C15E/C20/A6/E8/E10
  - Segway ZT3 Pro/Pro E
- Go Kart
  - Ninebot Gokart Kit/Kit2
  - Segway-Ninebot Mecha Kit
  - Segway Go Kart Pro 2
- E-Bike
  - Ninebot by Segway Urban A200/A200P/A300 Delivery/B100/B200 (series of sharing e-bikes)
  - Segway Xafari
- E-Motorcycle
  - Segway Xyber
- Moped

Series meanings: N low-end, cheap; M general purpose, high value, high tech; E sports, handling focus, high performance; Q/C/A/V cute, beauty, commuter, family use, lower specs

  - Segway E110 SE/S
  - Segway E125S
  - Segway E150S
  - Segway E250S
  - Segway E300SE
  - Segway B110S

Products branded Segway Navimow

- Navimow i 105/110
- Navimow H 800-VF/1500-VF/3000-VF
- Navimow X3 15/30/50/90

Segway Powersports

- All Terrain Vehicle
  - Snarler AT6 S/L
  - UT10 Crew P/S
  - Fugleman UT10 E/X
  - UT10 P/S
  - UT6 P/M/S
  - Villain SX10 WP/P
  - Super Villain SX20

Power Station

- Portable Power Station
  - Segway Cube 1000
  - Segway Cube 2000
  - Segway Lumina 500
  - Segway Battery Pack BTX1000
- Solar Panel
  - Segway SP100
  - Segway SP200

== See also ==
- Segway Fest, an annual convention of Segway PT users and enthusiasts
- Segway polo, similar to polo, except that instead of playing on horseback, each player rides a Segway PT on the field
