= Jonathan Gleich =

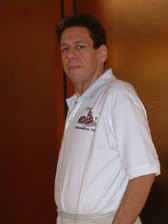
Jonathan Gleich in 2006

Jonathan Gleich (born October 19, 1958) is a Segway activist who has fought traffic tickets issued as a result of his use of the Segway in his commute to New York City.

Gleich was one of the first Segway enthusiasts in the New York area, logging more than 10,000 miles. Using his Segway to commute to work every day has landed him several moving violations, followed by subsequent appearances in court to defend them.

Gleich won first prize in the Motorized Float division at the 2009 Coney Island Mermaid Parade appearing as Zoltar (from the film Big) on his Segway. In 2008 he won third place as a "Segway Pirate."
