= Shane Chen =

Chinese-American inventor

- 陈星
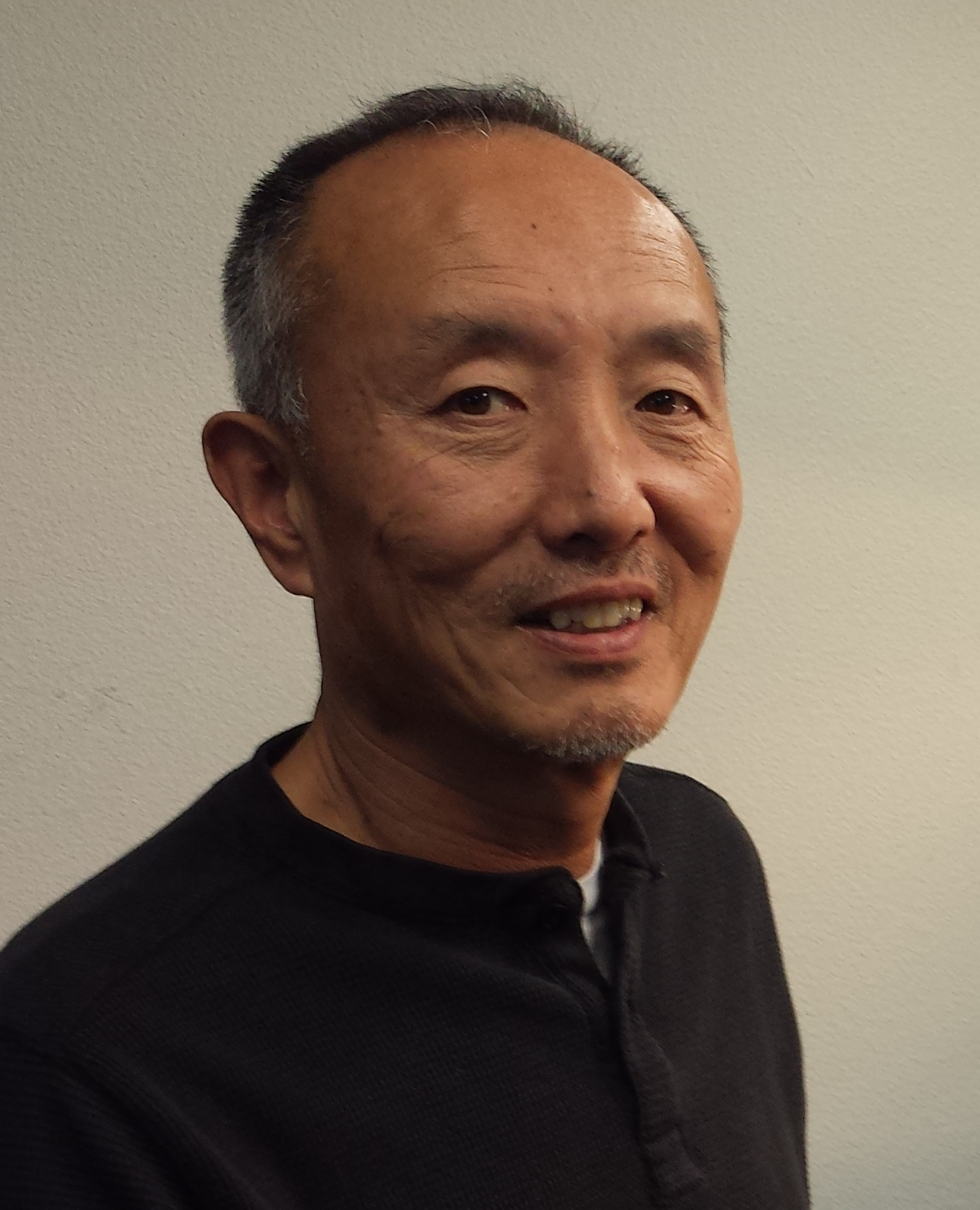
- Chen in 2016
- Born: February 10, 1956; Beijing, China
- Education: Beijing Agricultural University
- Occupations: Founder of Inventist, Inc.
- Known for: Inventor of Orbitwheel Skates, UltraDrainer, Lunicycle, Self-balancing unicycle and Self-balancing hoverboard
- Website: http://www.inventist.com/about

Shane Chen (Chinese: 陈星; born 10 February 1956 in Beijing, China) is a Chinese-American inventor and entrepreneur based in Camas, Washington. He is best known for inventing the self-balancing hoverboard.

== Early life and education ==
Chen grew up in Beijing, China and attended Beijing Agricultural University for a degree in agricultural meteorology. A difficult environment for starting and growing businesses in mid-1980s China led Chen to immigrate to America in search of better opportunities.

== Career and inventions ==
In 1988 he founded CID, Inc. (now called CID Bio-Science), to develop scientific instruments for plant and agricultural research. Specific products in the field included photosynthesis meter, a leaf scanner and a plant canopy analyzer. During that time Chen worked with NASA and developed a special leaf area meter that was sent to space used in Mir space station. Chen sold CID in 2009 to become a full-time inventor of consumer products.

In 2003 Chen founded Inventist, Inc., a company he started as an avenue with which he could develop more mainstream ideas and inventions. Entering the retail marketplace in ‘03, Chen introduced the AquaSkipper, a human-powered hydrofoil watercraft. The AquaSkipper won many awards including being a finalist at ISPO BrandNew awards, and it was featured on The History Channel's Modern Marvels as part of an invention competition. Next, Chen developed and patented a three-wheeled scooter and licensed the design to RazorUSA in 2006.

Chen continued to develop other consumer products notably the Orbitwheel Skates, UltraDrainer, Lunicycle, Solowheel and Hovertrax.

He has ongoing problems with illegally made copies of his products, which are being produced and distributed worldwide out of China.

=== Solowheel development (A spinning wheel) ===
In March 2010, he filed a provisional patent for Solowheel, a self-balancing electric unicycle, using a gyroscopic sensors to balance the unit in the direction of travel.

The Solowheel won numerous awards including 2011 ISPO Bike BrandNew finalist in Munich, Germany and 2012 INPEX Invention Trade Show first runner-up in Pittsburgh, Pennsylvania. It has been featured on The Weather Channel and Bloomberg TV in 2011. In 2012 on MLB Fan Cave and The Doctors TV show.

=== Hovertrax development ===
In February 2012, a provisional patent application was filed for the Hovertrax. The patent was granted in 2014.

The Hovertrax was released to the public in 2013. The Hovertrax was the first self-balancing scooter of the type that become known as hoverboards.
