= Robstep =

Two-wheeled electric personal vehicle

Robstep (Chinese: 易步; pinyin: Yì Bù; lit. 'Easy Step') is a line of two-wheeled, self-balancing, battery-powered electric vehicles invented by Dongguan Robstep Robot Co., Ltd. of Guangdong, Dongguan, China. The name "Robstep" is a portmanteau of the words "robot" and "step", meaning robotic steps. The devices have been compared to Segways.

Computers and motors inside of the device keep the Robstep upright when powered on with balancing enabled. A user commands the Robstep to go forward by shifting their weight forward on the platform, and backward by shifting their weight backward. The Robstep detects, as it balances, the change in its center of mass, and first establishes and then maintains a corresponding speed, forward or backward. Gyroscopic sensors and fluid-based level sensors detect the weight shift. To turn, the user presses the handlebar to the left or the right. Robsteps are driven by electric motors and can reach a speed of 9.3 miles per hour (15 km/h).

Robsteps are comparable to Segways. They are known as human transporters and personal mobility devices. Some customers use them as a disability device. There are now two different types of batteries fitted on these devices. One is considered a dangerous good for airline travel (lithium ion) and the other type is acceptable (nickel metal hydride). Engineering conversion from one battery type to the other is now available from various after-market engineering firms and the conversion is indicated by an authorized sticker placed adjacent to the name plate on modified units.
