= Onewheel =

Self-balancing electric skateboard

Future Motion Inc.

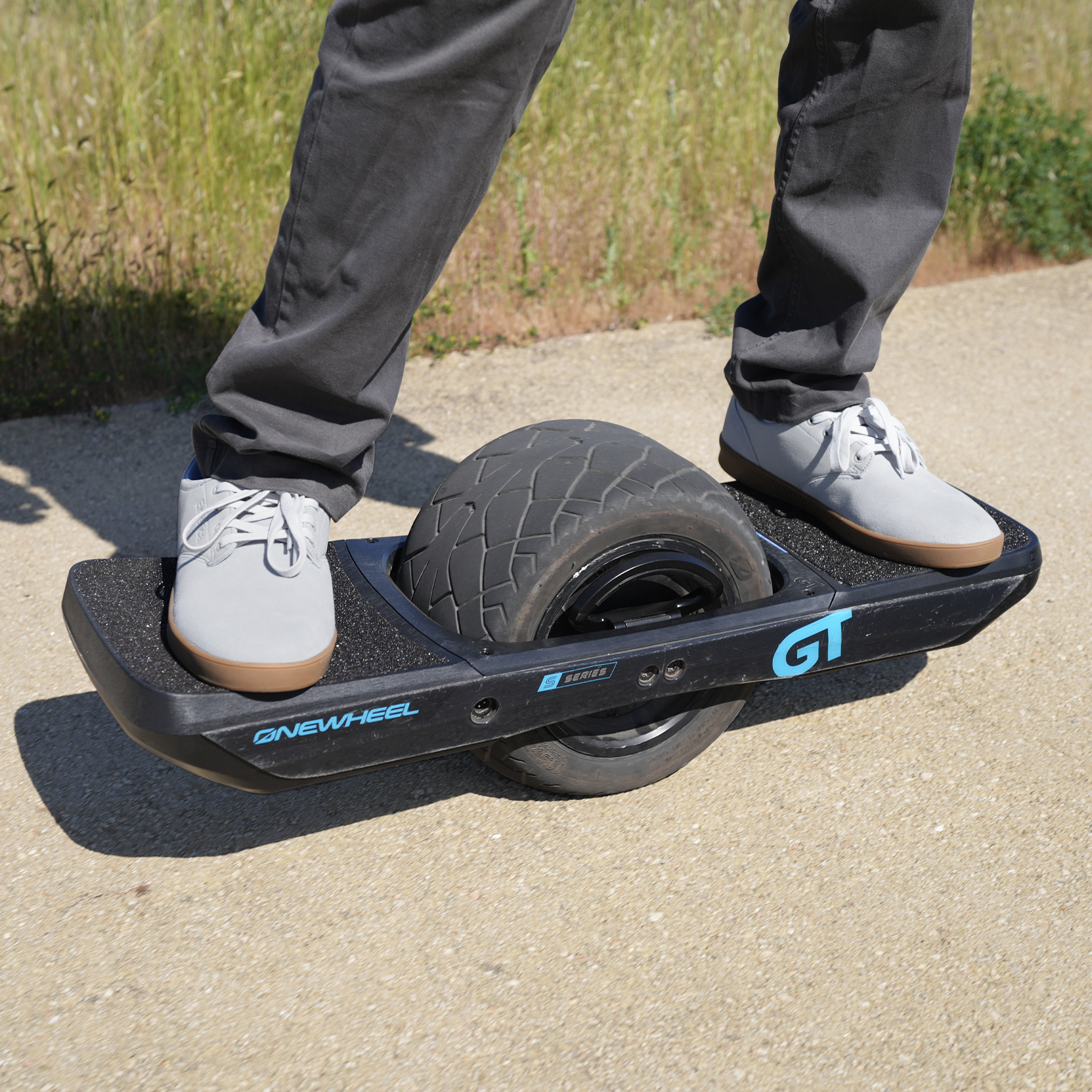
- Type: Private
- Industry: Electronic transport
- Founded: 2014; 12 years ago
- Founder: Kyle Doerksen
- Headquarters: Santa Cruz, California, United States
- Products: Electric skateboards
- Number of employees: 100
- Website: onewheel.com

Onewheel is a self-balancing electric skateboard with a single tire, used as a means of transportation and for boardsports. Riders place their feet on either side of the tire to face sideways, leaning forward to accelerate and leaning backward to slow down. The board was engineered to emulate the feeling of snowboarding on powder.

Launched in 2014 by Kyle Doerksen, the project raised over $630,000 on Kickstarter. Since then, 9 Onewheel models have been introduced, with the latest being released in November 2024. The Onewheel lineup includes the Pint, Pint X, Pint S, XR Classic, GT, and the GT S-Series, which has a top speed of 25 mph (40 km/h) and a range of up to 25 miles (40 km). Discontinued models include the original Onewheel, Onewheel+, and Onewheel+ XR. They have been ridden in 139 countries, covering over 170 million miles (274 million km) with more than 300,000 riders globally.

== History ==
Future Motion Inc. founder and CEO Kyle Doerksen created a commercial version of the Onewheel concept. Doerksen holds two engineering degrees from Stanford University, including a master's degree in mechanical engineering. In 2013, he left his job at IDEO and started Future Motion Inc. in Santa Cruz. He launched Onewheel on Kickstarter on January 6, 2014; the Kickstarter exceeded its campaign goal of $100,000 and reached over $630,000 by January 27, 2014. The original Onewheel was released in 2014.

=== Racing ===
Onewheel has grown into a boardsport with participants racing on off-road terrain, similar to mountain bike trails. The first official Onewheel race took place in 2016 at Vail Ski Resort during the GoPro Mountain Games in a boardercross-style competition. The race was titled Race for the Rail, where competitors raced for a trophy constructed from a Onewheel frame rail. Future Motion has hosted Race for the Rail in each subsequent year and the event has become the main competitive event for Onewheel racing. In 2020, the cash prize increased from $2,500 to $10,000 for the winning men's and women's riders. In 2021, the Onewheel Racing League was formed to formalize a number of grassroots racing events which allow riders to qualify for Race for the Rail. The 2022 and 2023 Race for the Rail events were hosted at Sky Tavern Ski Resort in Reno, Nevada and were re-aired on ESPN Ocho and ESPN 2. The 2024 Race for the Rail took place at Sky Tavern Ski Resort, where competitors from various countries participated in a series of races to qualify for the World Championships and a $10,000 prize.

=== Onewheel in pop culture ===
Onewheels have gained recognition in popular culture and action sports through appearances in social media content, TV shows and movies. In addition, numerous celebrities and athletes have been known to ride Onewheels adding to their popularity. Skateboard legend Tony Hawk and Surf Icon Kelly Slater rode early prototype versions of the board. Prominent DIY enthusiast, Adam Savage is regularly seen riding a Onewheel and has constructed his own board in the Onewheel factory. Many YouTube personalities have included Onewheel boards in their videos including Peter McKinnon, Casey Neistat, The Diesel Brothers, CboysTV, and Matti Haapoja. Electronic dance music producer Fellow Traveler has 17,732 miles on his Onewheel GT and is ranked 5th out of the top 10 on the Onewheel app's mileage leaderboard.

== Board technology ==
=== Operation ===
To use the board, riders place their feet on either side of the wheel. A rider's front foot goes on top of a pressure-sensitive pad that detects when a rider is on the board; there is also a back footpad. To direct the board, riders lean slightly in the direction they want to travel. To stop, riders lift their heel off the side of the front footpad. Since the Onewheel Pint, riders can use the optional dismount system, Simplestop, by leaning back to make the board stop slowly and disengage, allowing riders to step off. This convenient feature can be turned off in the Android/iOS app. The Onewheel GT and newer boards come with the new Digital Shaping 3.0 and the Simplestop feature from the Pint and Pint X. According to a review by Wired magazine, Future Motion has taken steps to make their boards safer by including the Simplestop technology and the pushback feature.

=== Engineering ===
Onewheel's single wheel contains a brushless electric motor that spins to propel riders forwards or backwards making constant small adjustments to keep riders balanced. Each Onewheel has three internal accelerometers and gyroscopes that continuously measure the orientation of the board in space. These monitors take readings approximately 14,000 times per second in order to tell the motor what to do to help riders balance and move.

All of the models use 'Pushback' and Haptic Buzz to warn the rider that they are about to reach the maximum safe speed. Pushback gently forces the nose of the Onewheel up when riders approach unsafe speeds, alerting riders that they need to slow down.

Riders are able to use an app that displays battery charge, miles traveled, and up to 5 different riding modes. The app also allows riders to control other board functions to personalize how the board responds to their riding style. Starting in late 2023, the Onewheel GT and GT S-Series models include Custom Shaping which allows for customization of the 5 standard riding modes. There are 7 Custom Shaping options in the app to control different ride characteristics: Breaking Aggressiveness, Aggressiveness Profile, Dynamic Responsiveness, Roll, Yaw Mix-Rate, Jump Re-engagement, and Zone Engagement.

=== Terrain ability ===
One major advantage of Onewheels over e-skateboards is their ability to ride over a variety of terrain. "Onewheels are equipped with a go-kart sized tire allowing for off-road and all-terrain use." CleanTechnica has noted, "Onewheel brings together the benefits of electric mobility in a portable package that’s easy to master. It is extremely stable without sacrificing the fun factor."

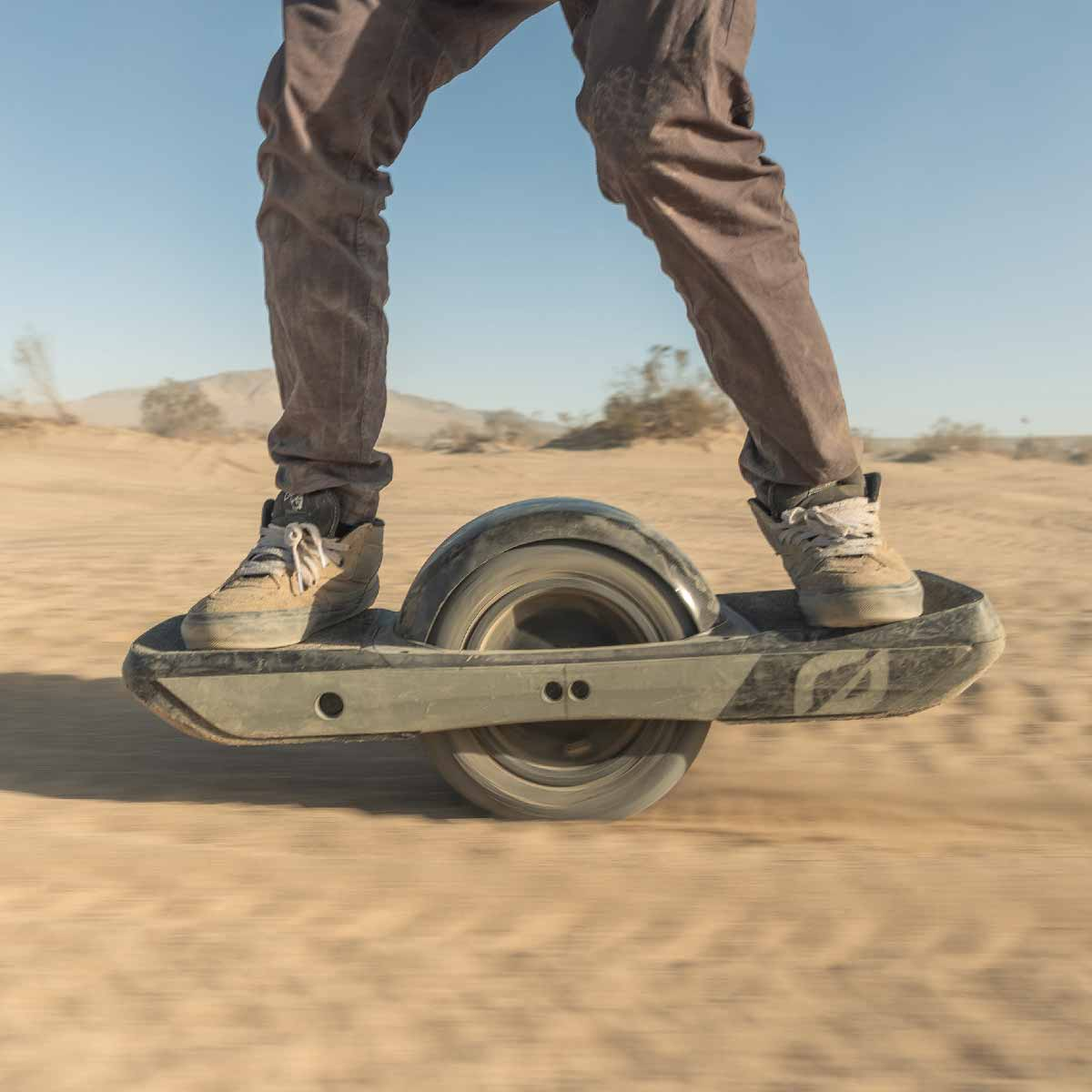
Onewheel GT with optional fender riding in the sand.

== Models ==
Starting in 2014, Future Motion has released 9 models of Onewheel boards. Each model varies in range, speed, and size. The newest board is the Rally XL, which was released in August 2025.

=== Available products ===
==== Pint ====
Released in 2019, Onewheel Pint has a range of 6–8 miles (9.7–12.9 km) and top speed of 16 miles per hour (26 km/h); The Pint includes an LED light display that indicates battery status and a handle for ease of carrying. It is still in production as of 2025. This smaller platform has a lower max weight recommendation of 250 lbs (113 kg).

==== Pint X ====
In October 2021, Onewheel announced 2 new models, the Onewheel GT, and the Onewheel Pint X. The Pint X has a top speed of 18 miles per hour (29 km/h), slightly faster than the Pint; and a range of 12–18 miles (19–29 km). It is slightly slower and has more notable pushback than an XR, but a similar range.

==== GT ====
Onewheel GT, introduced in October 2021, has a range of 20–32 miles (32–51 km) and a top speed of 20 miles per hour (32 km/h) - slightly faster than the XR. Onewheel GT weighs 35 pounds, has a maximum load capacity of 275 pounds, and is equipped with an 11.5-inch wheel.

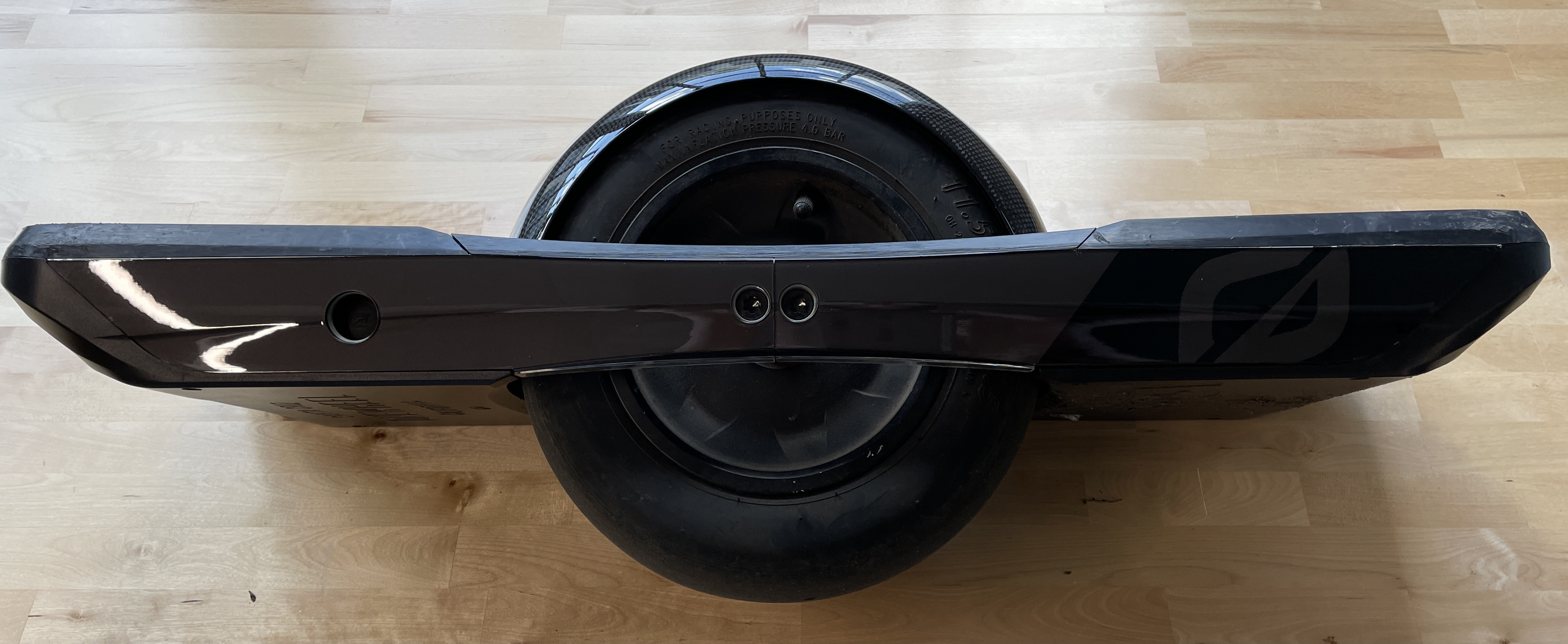
Onewheel GT with optional Carbon Fiber Fender & 'Murdered Out' themed Rail Guards.

==== GT S-Series ====
Onewheel GT S-series was announced in October 2023. It is being advertised as the most powerful Onewheel having a top speed of 25 mph (40 km/h). It has a reduced range of 16–25 miles compared to the 20-32 mile range of the GT. This is being called the first performance Onewheel by the manufacturer Future Motion. The new battery pack is increased from 75 volts of the current GT up to 113 volts, a 50% increase. The all new battery pack utilizes p45b 21700 cells for "more torque at speed". The GT S-Series also weighs 2 pounds lighter than the current GT. It includes three levels from $2,900 to $3,500, with the Rally Edition being the most expensive.

==== Pint S ====
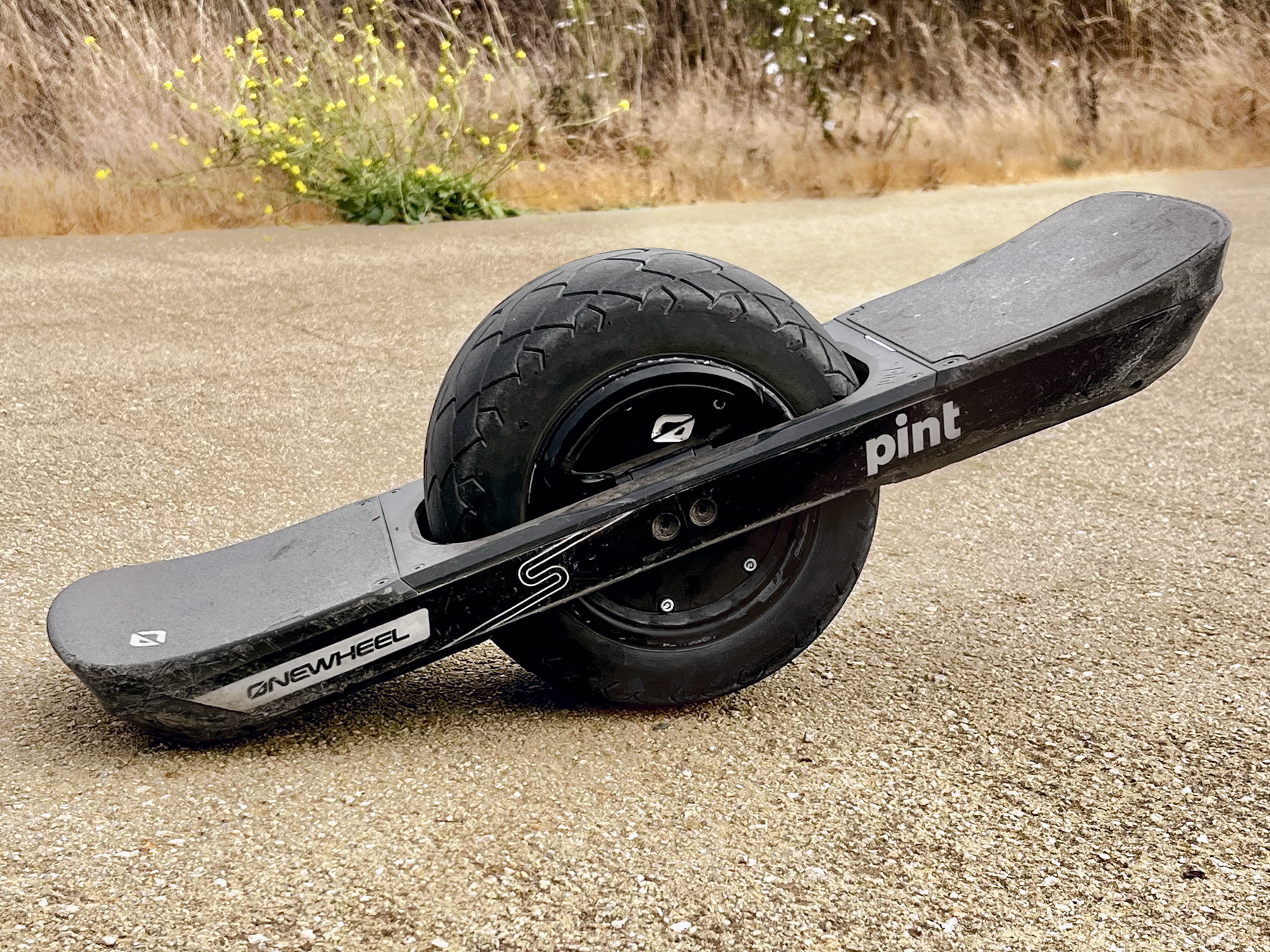
^{A Onewheel Pint S with on a gravel trail}

Onewheel Pint S was announced in September 2024. The Pint S has a top speed of 20 miles per hour (19–32 km/h), and a range of 12–18 miles (19–29 km). The Pint S is built on the same powertrain as the Pint X but comes with several factory-upgraded accessories including Pint Flared Footpads, a Maghandle Pro and the Pint Performance Treaded Tire. Additionally, Future Motion upgraded the Firmware on the Pint S board, maximizing the board's performance.

==== XR Classic ====
Onewheel XR Classic is the newest model announced in November 2024. It is an updated version of the Onewheel+ XR which was launched in 2018 and discontinued in 2021. The XR Classic upgrades the original Onewheel frame with tech improvements to deliver a more responsive and powerful ride. It also has a lowered center of gravity that helps improve stability, especially at higher speeds. The XR Classic has a top speed of 20 miles per hour (32 km/h) and a range of 17–24 miles (19–29 km), which is 30% more range than its predecessor.

=== Discontinued products ===
==== Onewheel ====
The original model, Onewheel, had a range of 4–6 mi (6.5–9.5 km) and a top speed of 13 miles per hour (21 km/h). It was shown at the Consumer Electronics Show on January 6, 2014; it has since been discontinued.

==== Onewheel+ ====
The subsequent version, Onewheel+, introduced in January 2017, had an improved range of 5–7 miles (8.0–11.3 km) and top speed of 19 miles per hour (31 km/h).

==== Onewheel+ XR ====
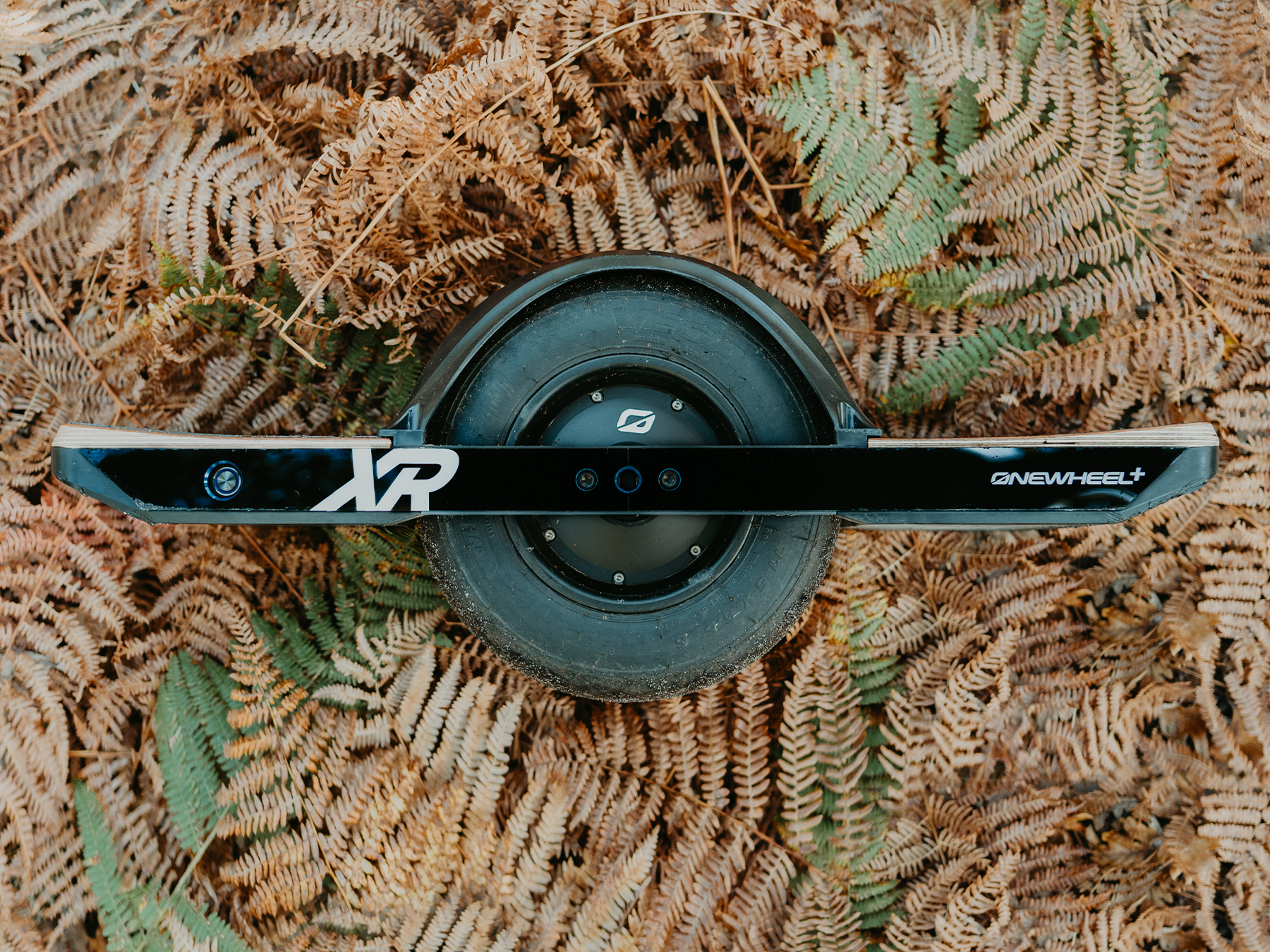
A Onewheel XR with optional fender on a forest floor

The Onewheel+ XR was introduced in 2018 with a range of 12–18 miles (19–29 km) and top speed of 19 miles per hour (31 km/h). In 2021, the Onewheel+ XR was discontinued in favor of the Onewheel GT, and was on sale at a US$300 (equivalent to $356.44 in 2025) discount until the remaining XR inventory sold out on December 13, 2021.

== Third-party modifications ==
There is a community of creators of third-party modifications for Onewheels, including larger battery packs, auxiliary wheels ("fangs"), protective plates ("bumpers"), third-party grip tape, and more.

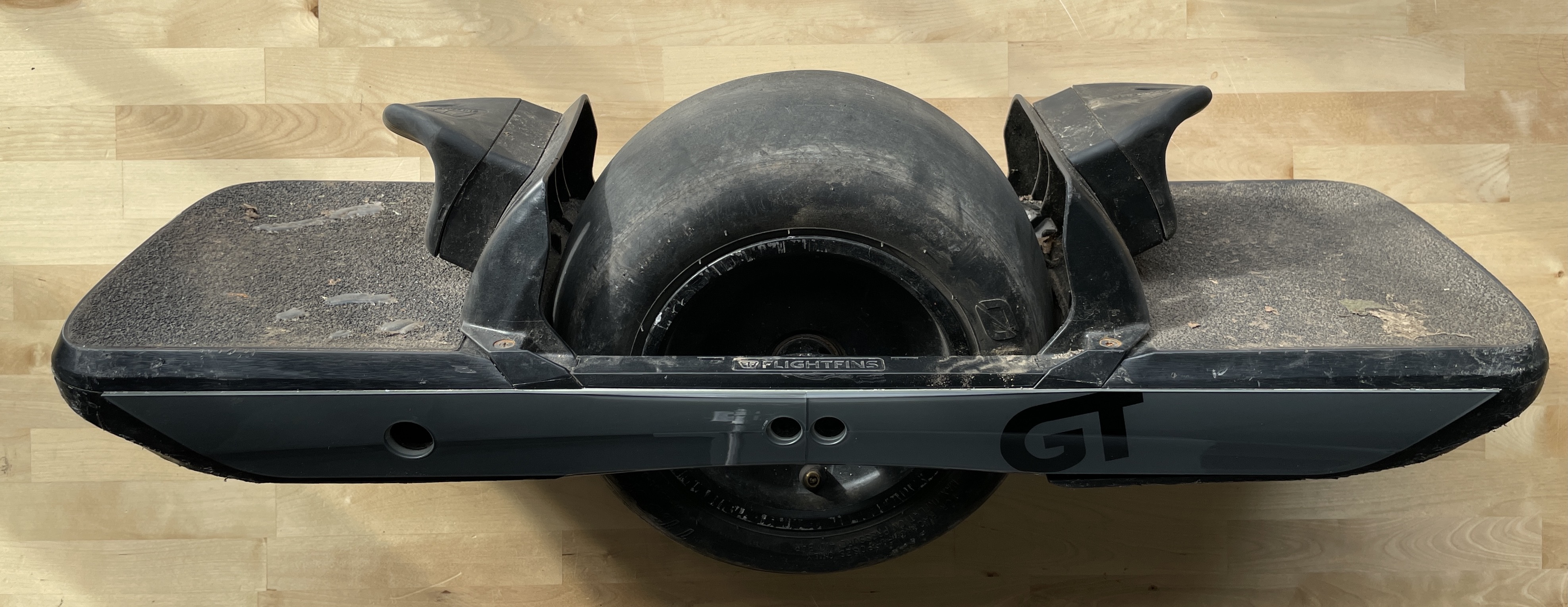
A Future Motion Onewheel GT with Jewel Grey Rail Guards and the Full Flight Systems by Flight Fins. Flight Fins allow the riders feet to more easily remain on the footpads by adding a soft lip above the foot.

== Criticism ==
=== Right to repair ===
Future Motion has faced criticism for not allowing third party modifications or repairing of the board outside of their one repair center in California. Future Motion did soften their stance on third-party tires, no longer treating them as warranty-voiding alterations. In 2024, Future Motion began selling replacement motors, batteries, footpad controllers, modules, and various spare parts if purchased from their website. There is a third-party modifications community for Onewheels, with modifications including, "Flight Fins", custom angled rails, and protective ("float") plates.

=== GT issues ===
On August 11, 2022, Future Motion announced a voluntary recall of approximately 20,500 Onewheel GT front footpads. This was in response to 813 reports of the footpad failing to disengage after the rider had dismounted.

=== Safety issues and recall ===
On November 16, 2022, the U.S. Consumer Product Safety Commission (CPSC) issued a warning saying that consumers should stop using Onewheels. Future Motion originally objected to the CPSC statement, stating that Onewheel products were safe when operated following basic safe riding principles common to any board sport, including wearing a helmet and other safety gear. In September 2023, Future Motion provided a recall in the form of a firmware update. This recalled all Onewheels, not by physically taking them back but through firmware update. The company said the devices can stop balancing if their performance limits are exceeded. It offered an update that gives haptic feedback when the limits are reached, for the Onewheel GT, Pint X, Pint, and XR models.

== See also ==
- Electric skateboard – Type of skateboard powered by an electric motor
- Electric unicycle – Self-balancing single wheel personal transporter
- Monowheel – One-wheeled vehicle
- Personal transporter – Ridable small motorised road vehicles
- Self-balancing scooter – Battery-powered electric vehicle
