= Jimi Heselden =

British businessman (1948 – 2010)

Jimi Heselden OBE
- Born: James William Heselden; 27 March 1948; Leeds, England
- Died: 26 September 2010 (aged 62); Thorp Arch, England
- Occupation: Entrepreneur
- Years active: c. 1985–2010
- Known for: Chairman of Hesco Bastion Ltd
- Children: 5

James William "Jimi" Heselden OBE (27 March 1948 – 26 September 2010) was an English entrepreneur. A former coal miner, he became wealthy by manufacturing the Hesco bastion barrier system. In 2009, he bought Segway Inc. He died in 2010 from injuries sustained falling from a cliff while riding his own Segway PT.

== Early life ==
James William Heselden was born in the Halton Moor district of Leeds on 27 March 1948. He attended school in Osmondthorpe, leaving at the age of 15 to work as a labourer and then at collieries in Temple Newsam and Lofthouse. He lost his job in the wave of redundancies that followed the 1980s miners' strike; he spent his redundancy money on renting a workshop, and initially set up a sandblasting business. He then worked on developing and patenting a collapsible wire mesh and fabric container, later called the Hesco bastion, to be used for building flood management and to limit erosion.

== Career ==
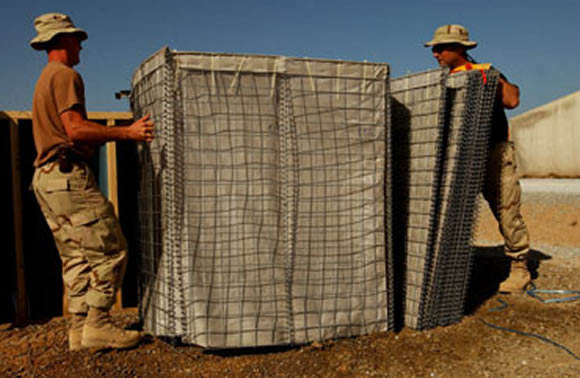
Members of the U.S. military assembling Hesco bastions

In 1989, Heselden founded Hesco Bastion Ltd to manufacture containers of the same name; filled with sand or earth, they quickly found favour with the armies of several countries, as they allowed effective blast walls, barriers and revetments to be quickly constructed. Made in Hesco's factory in Leeds, these were shipped (flat-packed) in great numbers to conflict zones, including Kosovo, Iraq and Afghanistan, as well as later being used for flood defences at New Orleans. He was appointed Officer of the Order of the British Empire (OBE) in the 2006 Queen's Birthday Honours, "for services to the Defence industry and to Charity."

On Christmas day 2009, Heselden purchased the Segway company. He had owned the company for only nine months at the time of his accidental death while using a Segway.

== Philanthropy ==
In 2008, Heselden donated £1.5 million to the Help For Heroes fund through a charity auction bid for nine people to fly with the Red Arrows. Heselden said, "There are people out there who are making money and when times are good I honestly believe people have a moral obligation to use their wealth to help others." Also in 2008, Heselden contributed £10 million to setting up the Leeds Community Foundation; he would later donate an additional £13 million.

== Personal life ==
Heselden had 5 children; 3 daughters and 2 sons.

== Death ==
On the morning of 26 September 2010, Heselden was riding his Segway while walking his dog near Thorp Arch; when he reversed the Segway to allow a dog walker to get past him, he fell from a nearby cliff into the River Wharfe. A "rugged country version" of a Segway was found in the water. The coroner concluded that Heselden had died of "multiple blunt force injuries of the chest and spine consistent with a fall whilst riding a gyrobike". His estate, bequeathed to his widow and family, was worth over £340,000,000 and he was ranked in the top 400 members of the Sunday Times Rich List.

== See also ==
- List of unusual deaths in the 21st century
