= Inmotion SCV =

EUC brand

The Inmotion SCV is a series of self-balancing, sensor controlled, battery-powered dicycles and electric unicycles from Inmotion Technologies of Shenzhen, China.

== Design ==
Inmotion SCV vehicles apply dynamic self-balancing technology and FOC technology with the assistance of gyroscopes and accelerometers to sense the rider's body movements while riding, and uses servo control systems to precisely drive the motor(s) to keep it always balanced. To turn, the rider presses the handlebar to the left or the right or leans in the intended direction; and to speed up or slow down, the user leans forward and backward. INMOTION SCV vehicles are driven by electric motors and can reach a speed of up to 31 miles per hour (50 km/h). It has been compared to Segways. SCV is an abbreviation for sensor controlled vehicle.

These vehicles perform best on smooth sidewalks, although they can be used for mild off-roading; with some models containing suspension mechanisms to smooth out bumpy and un-paved surfaces.
