= Self-balancing scooter =

Battery-powered electric vehicle

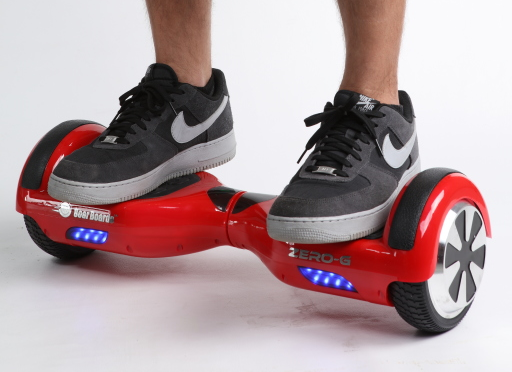
A self-balancing scooter (hoverboard)

A self-balancing scooter (also hoverboard, self-balancing board, electric scooter board, or swegway) is a self-balancing personal transporter consisting of two motorized wheels connected to a pair of articulated pads on which the rider places their feet. The rider controls the speed by leaning forward or backward, and direction of travel by twisting the pads.

Invented in its current form in early 2013, the device is the subject of complex patent disputes. Volume manufacture started in China in 2014 and early units were prone to catching fire due to an overheating battery which resulted in product recalls in 2016, including over 500,000 units sold in the United States by eight manufacturers. There have been 23 official recalls since 2016, affecting around 1,115,200 units in total.

== History ==
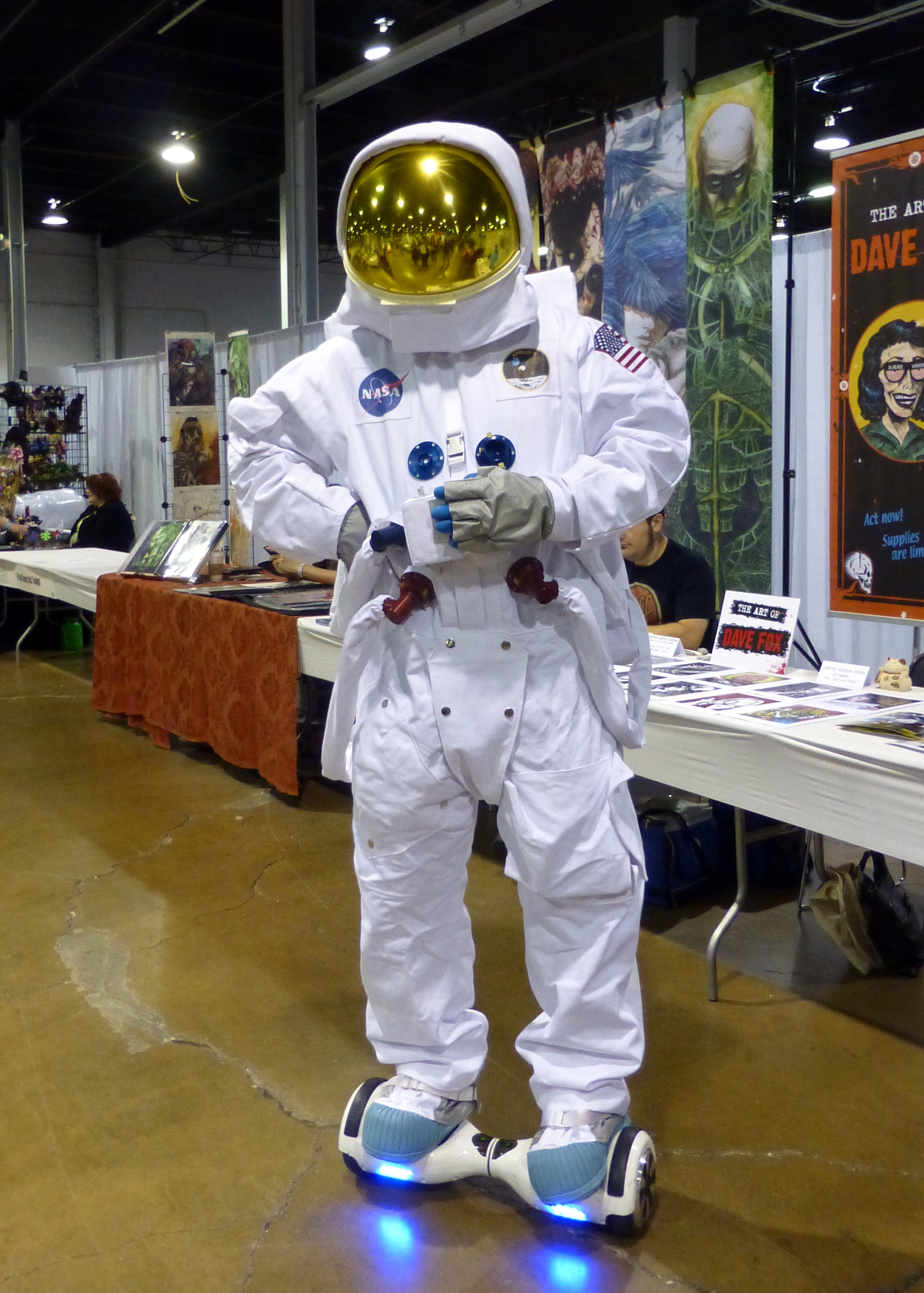
A cosplayer riding a self-balancing board at the 2015 Wizard World Chicago

Shane Chen, a Chinese businessman and founder of Inventist filed a patent for a device of this type in February 2013 and launched a Kickstarter fund-raising campaign in May 2013.

The devices' increasing popularity in USA has been attributed, initially, to endorsement by a wide array of celebrities (including Justin Bieber, Jamie Foxx, Kendall Jenner, Chris Brown, Soulja Boy and Wiz Khalifa). The founders of the American company PhunkeeTree encountered the board at the Hong Kong Electronics Show in 2014 and became involved in its distribution shortly thereafter.

By June 2015, the board was being made by several manufacturers, mainly in the Shenzhen region of China. In January 2015 through Inventist, he announced his intention to pursue litigation In April 2015, Ninebot, a significant manufacturer of devices acquired Segway Inc. (which separately asserted that it holds patents for self-balancing scooters.) in order to resolve the dispute. In May, Chen voiced his frustrations regarding patent rights in China. In August 2015, Mark Cuban announced plans to purchase the Hovertrax patents from Chen. Many of the units provided in the first year of manufacture were defective and likely to catch fire, resulting in a major product recall from multiple manufacturers during 2016 (more details below).

In June 2016 the U.S. International Trade Commission issued an injunction for patent infringement against UPTECH, U.P. Technology, U.P. Robotics, FreeGo China, EcoBoomer, and Roboscooters. Robstep, INMOTION, Tech in the City, FreeGo settled with Segway.

== Etymology of "hoverboard" ==
The use of the term "hoverboard" to describe these devices, despite the fact that they do not hover, has led to considerable discussion in the media.

The first use of the term can be traced back to a 1967 science fiction novel by M. K. Joseph and subsequently popularized in the 1989 film, Back to the Future Part II where Marty McFly uses one after traveling to 2015. While the first trademarked use of hoverboard was registered in 1996 as a collecting and trading game, its first use as a commercial name representing a wheeled scooter was in 1999, and Guinness World Records lists a farthest hoverboard flight entry. In September 2015 the Oxford English Dictionary stated in their view the term had not been in use in the context for long enough for inclusion and that for the time being they would restrict their description to boards "that Marty McFly would recognize". The term "self-balancing electric scooter" remains popular.

== Design and operation ==
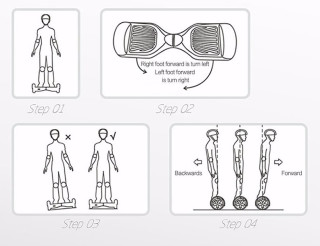
How to ride self-balancing scooter images step by step

The device has two 6.5–10-inch (170–250 mm) diameter wheels connected to a self-balancing control mechanism using built-in gyroscopic and a sensor pad. By tilting the pad the rider can control the speed and direction of travel achieving speeds from 6 to 15 miles per hour (9.7 to 24 km/h) with a range of up to 15 miles (24 km) dependent on model, terrain, rider weight and other factors.

As with most wheeled vehicles where the rider is exposed, Consumer Reports has recommended that users wear appropriate safety gear while using them.

In 2019, hoverboards now feature a self balancing mode, in which the motors automatically engage the gyroscope in the opposite direction. This way, when the rider leans forward or backward the board is always attempting to level itself, making it easier to ride than its 2016 predecessors.

== Issues and incidents ==
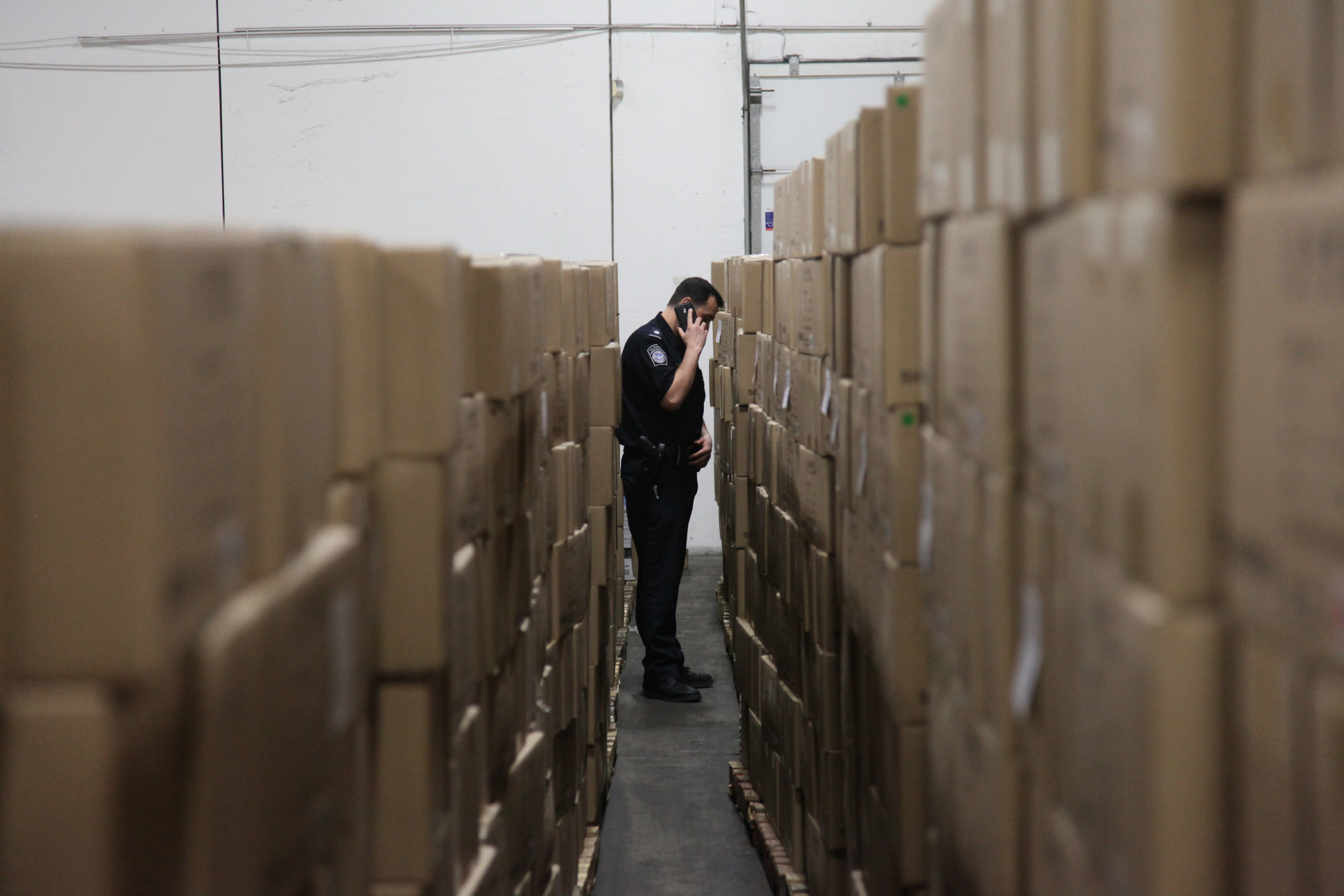
A Customs and Border Protection officer at the Chicago field office stands between aisles of seized counterfeit hoverboards.

There were many instances of units catching fire, with claims that they were responsible for numerous residential fires between late 2015 into 2016. In the United Kingdom, authorities expressed concerns with the boards, regarding possible faulty wiring. Many airlines banned the transportation of the boards, both as stored or carry-on luggage.

The US Consumer Product Safety Commission (CPSC) launched an investigation into the safety of the device in late 2015 and determined that the lithium-ion battery packs in the self-balancing scooters/hoverboards could overheat and posed a risk of catching fire or exploding, and that defects had led to 60 fires in over 20 states. In July 2016 the commission ordered the recall of over 500,000 units from eight manufacturers. The Swagway model X1 constituted the majority of the recalled "hoverboards," at 267,000 units.

In January 2016, the Philippine Department of Health and Trade and Industry issued a joint advisory cautioning the public against buying them, due to reports of injuries and "potential electrocution connected with its usage". The advisory also stated “as a precautionary measure, the DOH and DTI-Consumer Protection Group therefore advise parents against buying hoverboards for children under 14 years of age.”

In May 2016, the miniPRO produced by Segway Inc. received UL certification, as did a company in Shenzhen, China. In June 2016, after safety improvements in design, the UL-approved Swagtron was launched in the United States.

In March 2017, a self-balancing board was found to be the cause for a fire that killed two children in Harrisburg.

In 2018, a self-balancing board was blamed for a fire that severely damaged a Michigan home.

In March 2023, a self-balancing board was recalled for causing an April 2022 fire in Hellertown, Pennsylvania that killed two sisters.

== See also ==
- Caster board
- Electric skateboard
- Onewheel
- Segway
- Skateboard
- EUC
- Dicycle
