= Electric unicycle =

Self-balancing single wheel personal transporter

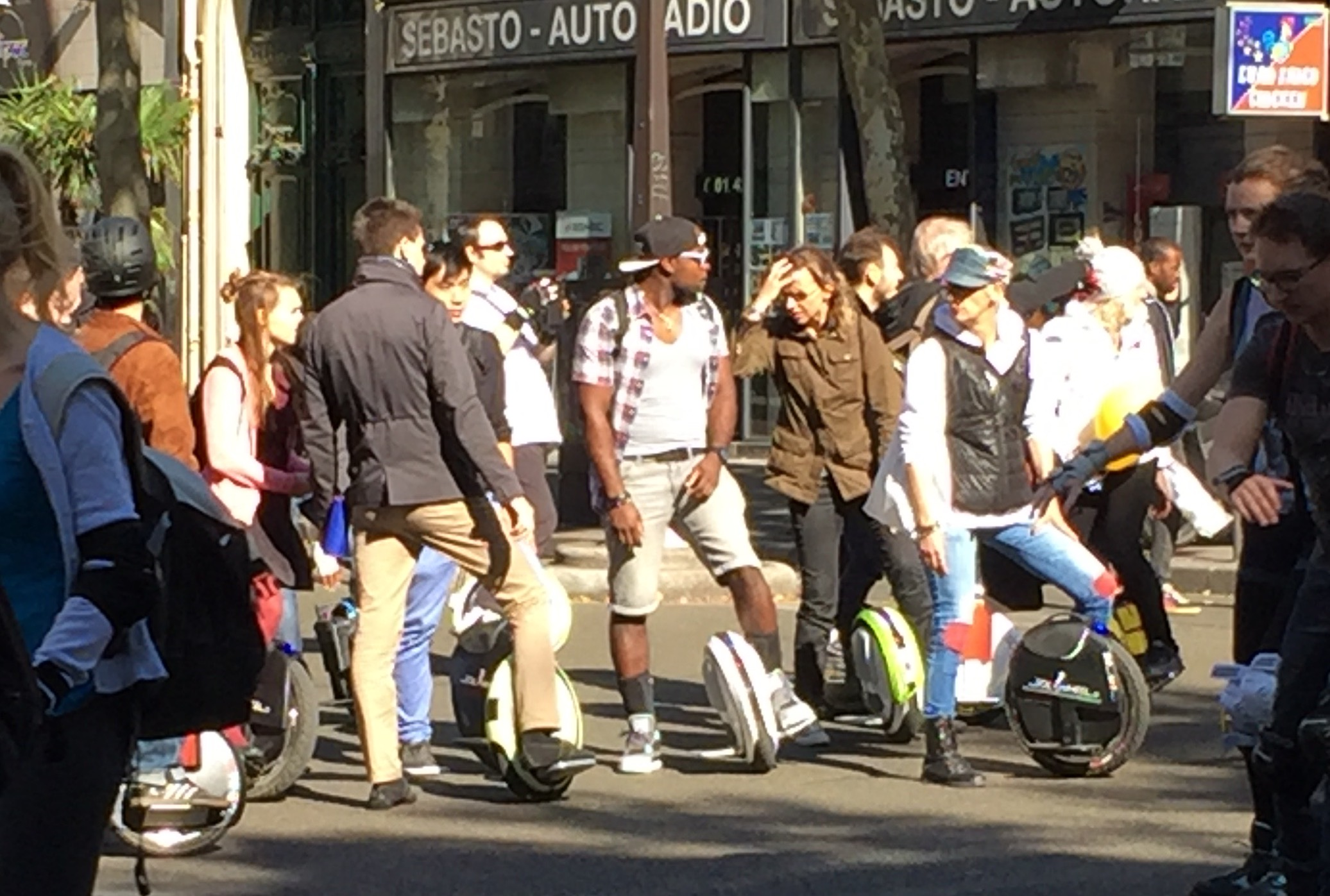
Self-balancing unicycles at 'Paris sans Voiture' (Paris without cars), September 2015

An electric unicycle (often initialized as EUC or acronymized yuke or Uni) is a self-balancing personal transporter with a single wheel. The rider controls speed by leaning forwards or backwards, and steers by twisting or tilting the unit side to side. The self-balancing mechanism uses accelerometers and gyroscopes. Most manufacturers of EUCs are based in China, including Segway, Inmotion, Kingsong, Begode, and Leaperkim.

== Operation ==
Similar to hoverboards, Onewheels, and Segways, electric unicycles are self-balancing in a forward and backward direction, with side-to-side (lateral) stability being provided by human steering motions that tilt or twist the unit, similar to Bicycle and motorcycle dynamics. The control of a unicycle can be considered to be similar to an inverted pendulum. Many electric unicycles have suspension, either operated by air or springs.

Electric unicycles come in varying speeds, battery capacities, and motor wattages. Low-end models may have speeds up to 15 mph and ranges of 10–15 miles, while advanced models being introduced in 2025 can reach 90 mph and over 100 miles per charge.

== History ==
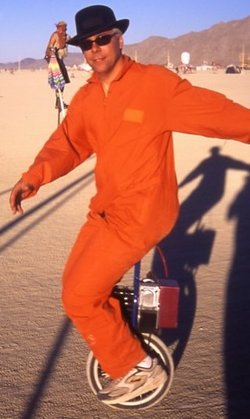
Trevor Blackwell demonstrates his prototype.

=== Early experimentation ===
A hand-power monowheel was patented in 1869 by Richard C. Hemming with a pedal-power unit patented in 1885. Various motorized monowheels were developed and demonstrated during the 1930s without commercial success and Charles F Taylor was granted a patent for a "vehicle having a single supporting and driving wheel" in 1964 after some 25 years of experimentation. In 1977 Charles Gabriel presented an electric unicycle that resembles the design of today's devices.

=== Commercialisation ===
In 2003, Bombardier announced a conceptual design for such a device used as a sport vehicle, the Embrio. In September 2004 Trevor Blackwell demonstrated a functional self-balancing unicycle, using a control-mechanism similar to that used by the Segway PT and published the designs as the Eunicycle. This approach was further refined by a group of engineering students at the University of Adelaide who developed The Micycle, which incorporated a hub-motor, a Lithium-Ion Battery and a novel steering mechanism where the wheel pivoted independent of the main chassis.

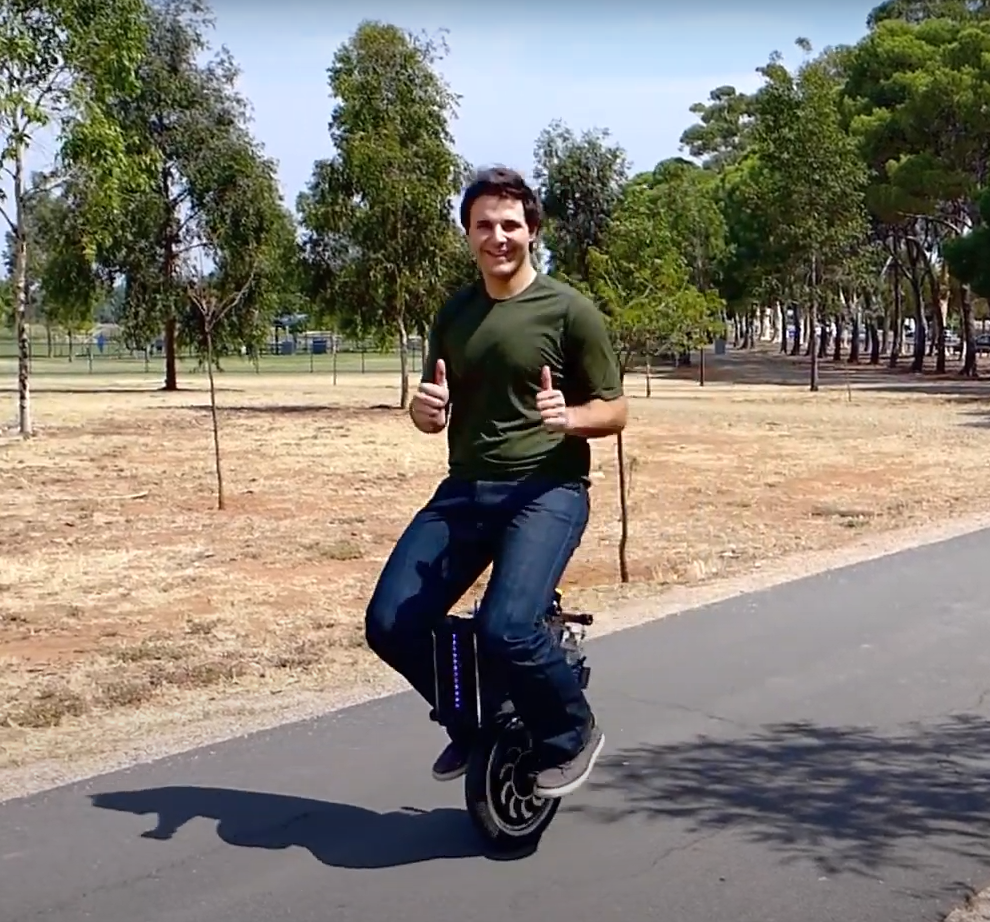
The Micycle in 2010 with its steering mechanism, hub motor and lithium-ion battery pack

Early units had a seat, which limited how much the unit could be tilted, but this was resolved with the transition to seatless units that could be tilted much more. In March 2010 Shane Chen of Inventist filed a patent application for a seatless electric unicycle (associated with the "Solowheel" product launched in February 2011), which uses flat pedals to stand on and leg contact surfaces to allow for stable, precise control in lieu of a seat. In Oct 2010 Focus Designs published a video of an electric unicycle with hub motor and a seat. They went on to produce three models. Late in 2015, the Ford Motor Company patented a "self-propelled unicycle engageable with vehicle", intended for last-mile commuters. Segway launched their Ninebot One S1 model in November 2017.

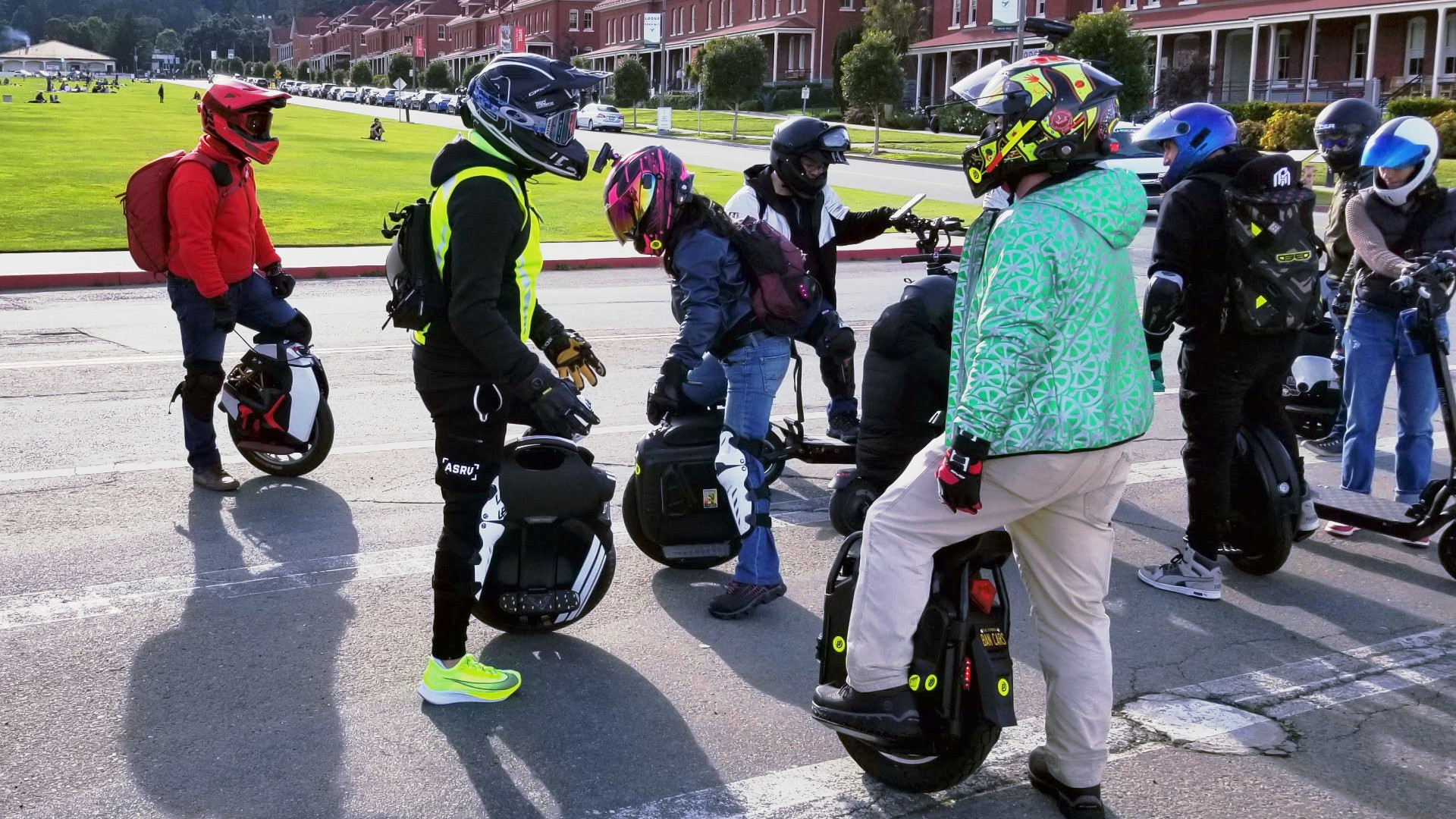
EUC and e-scooter riders participating in a group ride in San Francisco. PPE was worn due to higher top speed with newer EUC models. The man in a red jacket on the left was riding a suspension-model.

By the turn of the decade, several Chinese manufacturers dominate the market and continue to release EUC models with higher top speeds (above 75 km/h or 46 mph), and longer range batteries.

Popularity came around the same time as Begode (formerly known as Gotway) released their M super line. This evolved into the MSX & MSP models and eventually into the RS model. Around this time Veteran stepped on to the scene for the first time with their road wheel the Sherman. In 2020, suspension EUCs were revealed by Inmotion, Kingsong and Gotway. After suspension, companies began to work on higher speeds and motor voltages.

== Popular culture ==
- A motorized, gyroscopically balanced unicycle was described in 1940 in the short story "The Roads Must Roll" by Robert Heinlein.
- A self-balancing unicycle was described in 1969 in "The Man From R.O.B.O.T.", a short story by science fiction author Harry Harrison.

== Gallery ==
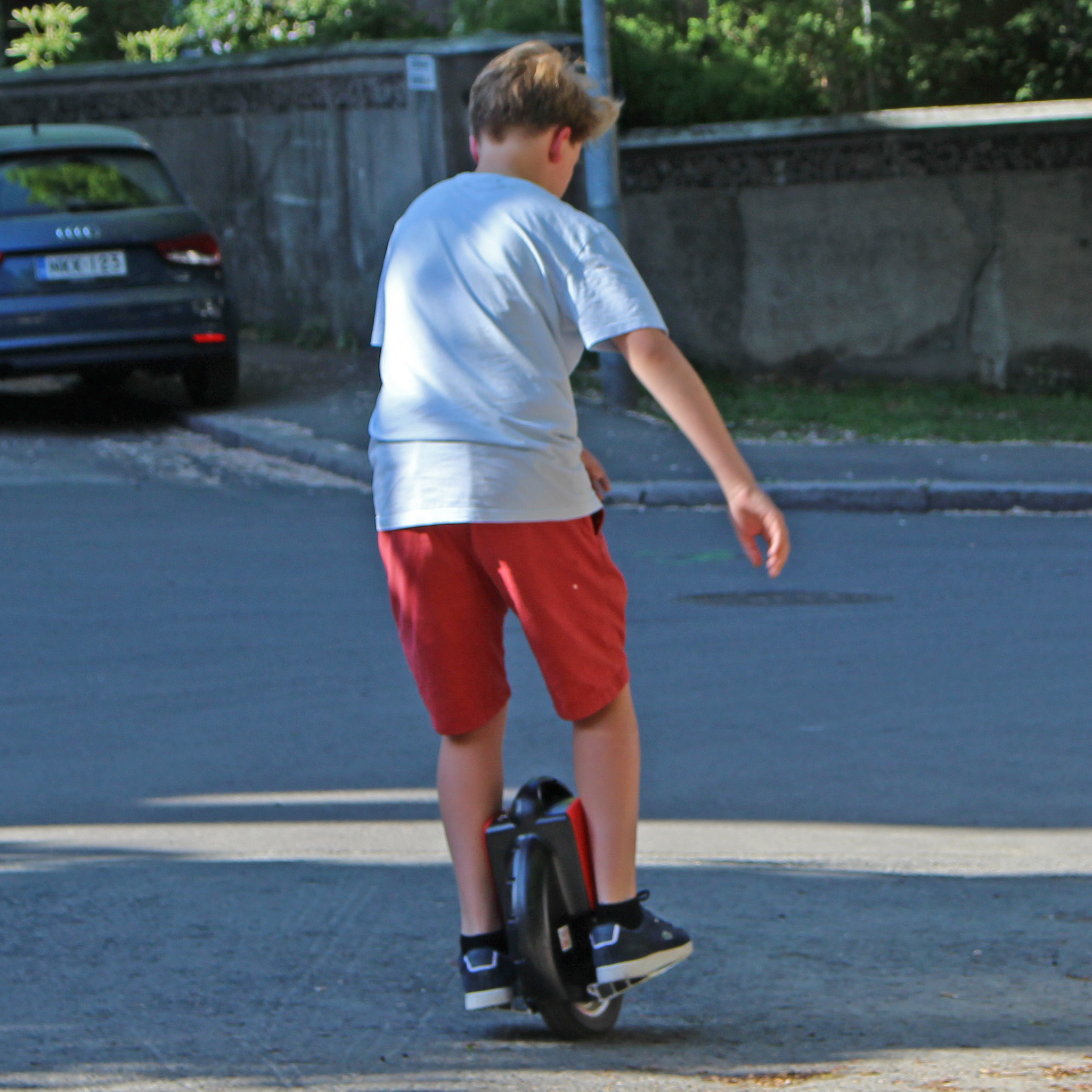
Device in use

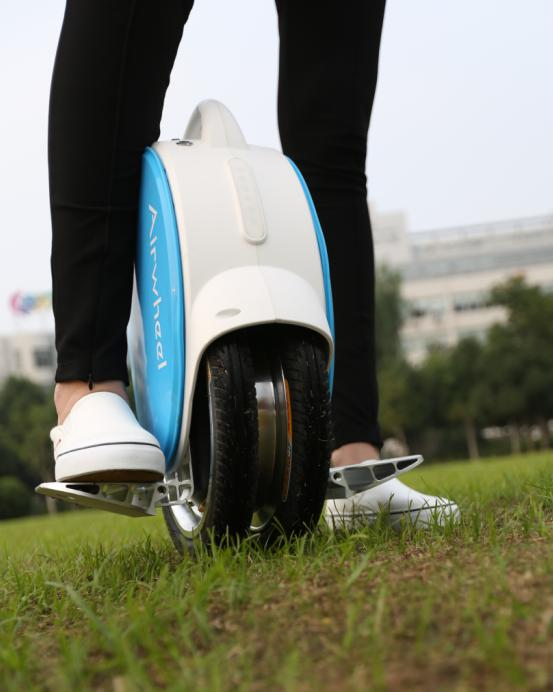
Airwheel with double-wheel

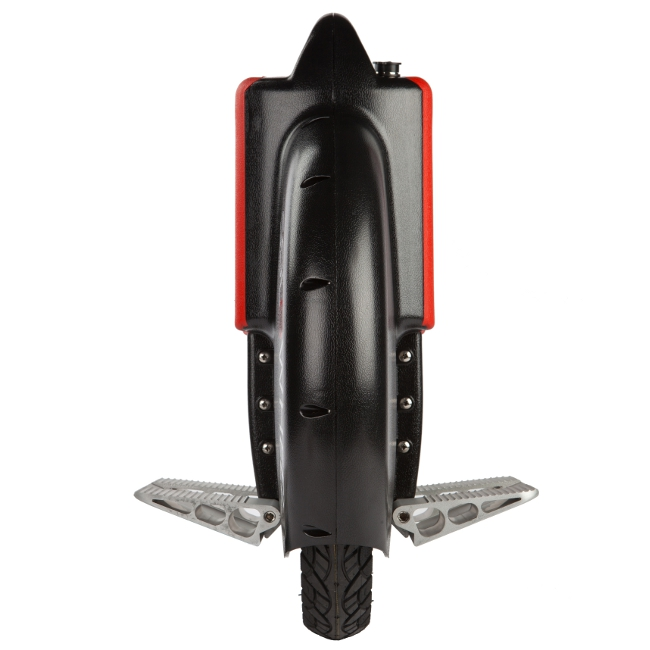
Front view of a solowheel

Traffic sign

Video of unit in use

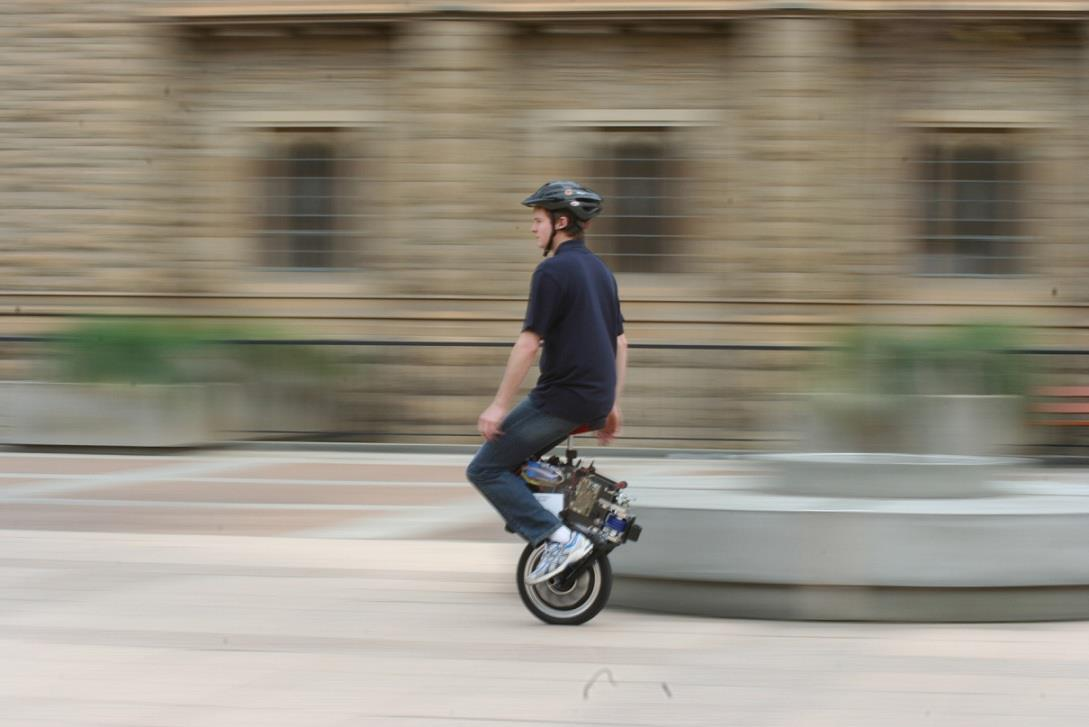
The Micycle

== Manufacturers ==
- Segway – Ninebot
- InMotion
- Inventist
- Begode (previously known as Gotway)
- Kingsong
- Leaperkim

== See also ==
- Ballbot, a mobile robot designed to balance on a single spherical wheel
- Bicycle and motorcycle dynamics
- Electric bicycle
- Honda U3-X, which looks like a self-balancing unicycle, but balances on a powered Omni wheel
- Inertia wheel pendulum
- Onewheel, a sort of electric skateboard
- RIOT wheel, a ridable single-axis self-balancing unicycle with an unusually low centre of gravity, with its rider in front of, rather than on top of its single wheel
- Unicycle
- Uno, a sort of dicycle
- B.C., a comic strip in which the caveman character Thor rides a wheel in the same manner as an EUC rider
  - B.C.'s Quest for Tires and B.C. II: Grog's Revenge, video games based on the comic strip that feature Thor riding his wheel
