= Inertia wheel pendulum =

An inertia wheel pendulum, also known as reaction wheel pendulum, is a pendulum with an inertia wheel attached. It can be used as a pedagogical problem in control theory. This type of pendulum is often confused with the gyroscopic effect, which has completely different physical nature.

== See also ==
- Inverted pendulum
- Robotic unicycle
- Spinning top
