= Segway =

Two-wheeled, self-balancing personal vehicle

Segway PT
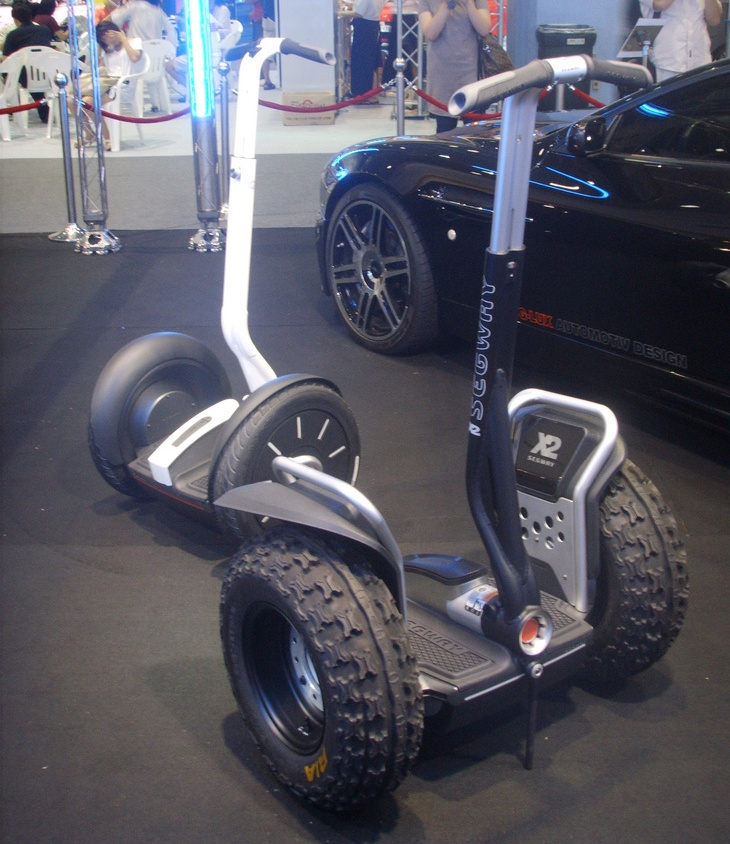
- Segway x2 and i2
- Type: Personal transporter
- Inventor: Dean Kamen
- Inception: 2001; 25 years ago
- Manufacturer: Segway Inc.
- Last production year: 2020; 6 years ago
- Models: i2 SE, x SE, miniPro, robot
- Website: https://segway.com

The Segway (/ˈsɛɡweɪ/ SEG-way) is a discontinued two-wheeled, self-balancing personal transporter invented by Dean Kamen. The name is a registered trademark of Segway Inc. It was brought to market in 2001 as the Segway HT, and then subsequently as the Segway PT. HT is an initialism for "human transporter" and PT for "personal transporter".

Ninebot, a Beijing-based rival, acquired Segway Inc. in April 2015, broadening the company to include other transportation devices. In June 2020, it was announced that it would no longer manufacture the Segway PT.

== History ==
=== Independent company ===
The Segway PT, referred to during development and initial marketing as the Segway HT, was developed from the self-balancing iBOT wheelchair, which was initially developed at the University of Plymouth in conjunction with BAE Systems and Sumitomo Precision Products. The first patent for a human transporter was filed in 1994 and granted in 1997, followed by others, including one submitted in June 1999 and granted in October 2001.

Prior to its introduction, a news report about a proposal for a book about the invention, development, and financing of the Segway PT led to speculation about the device and its importance. John Doerr speculated that it would be more important than the Internet. Steve Jobs was quoted as saying that it was "as big a deal as the PC". South Park devoted an episode to making fun of the hype before the product was released. The device was unveiled on 3 December 2001, following months of public speculation, in Bryant Park, New York City, on the ABC News morning program Good Morning America, with the first units delivered to customers in early 2002.

The original Segway PT models featured three speed settings: 6 miles per hour (9.7 km/h), 8 miles per hour (13 km/h) with faster turning, and 10 miles per hour (16 km/h). Steering of early versions was controlled using a twist grip that varied the speeds of the two motors. The range of the p-Series was 6–10 miles (9.7–16.1 km) on a fully charged nickel metal hydride (NiMH) battery with a recharge time of four to six hours. In September 2003, the Segway PT was recalled, because if users ignored repeated low-battery warnings on the PTs, it could ultimately lead them to fall.

In August 2006, Segway Inc. discontinued all previous models and introduced the i2 and x2 products, which were steered by leaning the handlebars to the right or left, had a maximum speed of 12.5 mph (20.1 km/h) from a pair of two-horsepower (1.5 kW) Brushless DC electric motors with regenerative braking and a range of up to 15–25 mi (24–40 km), depending on terrain, riding style, and state of the batteries. Recharging took eight to ten hours. The i2 and x2 also introduced the wireless InfoKey which could show mileage and a trip odometer, and put the vehicle into security mode, which locked the wheels and set off an alarm if it was moved, and could also be used to turn on the PT from up to 15 feet (4.6 m) away.

Segway Inc. was acquired by British businessman Jimi Heselden from its U.S. inventor Dean Kamen in December 2009. A year later, Heselden died after he "plunged into the River Wharfe while riding a rugged country version" of the Segway PT.

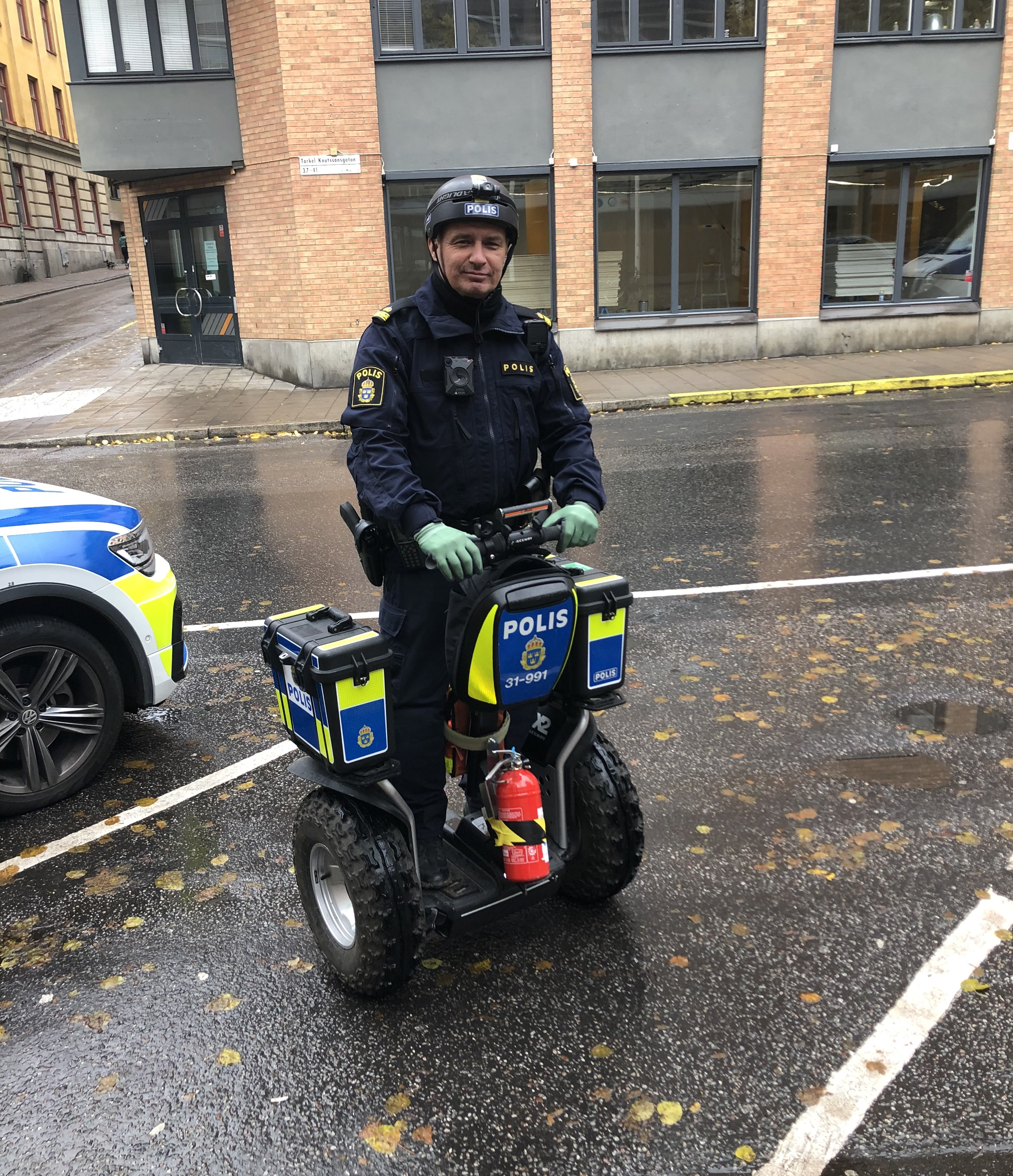
Policeman using a Segway in Stockholm, Sweden

Versions of the product prior to 2011 included (in order of release):

- Segway i167 (2001 revealed, 2002 shipped)
- Segway e167: As i167, with addition of electric kickstand
- Segway p133: Smaller platform and wheels and less powerful motors than the i and e Series with top speed of 10 miles per hour (16 km/h) in the p-Series
- Segway i180: With lithium-ion batteries
- Segway XT: The first Segway designed specifically for recreation
- Segway i2 (2006): The first on-road Segway PT with LeanSteer
- Segway x2 (2006): The first off-road Segway PT with LeanSteer

In March 2014, Segway Inc. announced third-generation designs, including the i2 SE and x2 SE sport, new LeanSteer frame and powerbase designs, with integrated lighting.

=== Subsidiary of Ninebot ===
Ninebot, a Beijing-based transportation robotics startup and a rival of Segway Inc., acquired Segway Inc. in April 2015, having raised $80M from Xiaomi and Sequoia Capital. The acquisition came months after the U.S. International Trade Commission agreed to investigate Segway Inc.'s claim that Ninebot and other companies were infringing on its patents and copyrights. Segway Inc. requested the blocking of imports of competing scooters into the United States.

In June 2016, Segway Inc. launched the Segway miniPRO, a smaller self-balancing scooter.

=== End of production ===
Only 140,000 units were sold during the lifetime of the product, and in the later years the Segway PT only made up 1.5% of total company profit. Factors contributing to the end of production include the price (US$5,000 at launch), and the learning curve in learning to balance on a Segway PT, which has led to notable accidents involving Usain Bolt, George W. Bush, Ellen DeGeneres, Ian Healy, and Segway Inc. previous owner Jimi Heselden. While the Segway has remained popular for security and tourism, e-scooters have been more popular for personal mobility.

=== UTVs ===
In February 2022, Segway entered the UTV (utility terrain vehicle) market.

== Products ==
At the end of production in 2020, Segway Inc. was selling these five self-balancing scooters:

Professional

- Segway i2 SE (professional self-balancing scooter for use in warehouses and other locations)
- Segway x2 SE (ruggedised self-balancing scooter for use on most challenging terrain)
- Segway Robot (autonomous robot based on the Segway miniPro)

Consumer

- Ninebot by Segway E+ (self-balancing scooter for general use)
- Ninebot by Segway miniPro (smaller self-balancing scooter for general use, controlled by a 'knee control bar')
- Segway GT1P/GT2 P(battery electric super kick scooter)
- GT1 (battery electric super kick scooter)
- GT2 (battery electric super kick scooter)
- ZT3Pro (battery electric kick scooter)
- Xafari (full suspension trekking ebike)
- Xyber (battery electric motorcycle)
- Dirt eBike X260 (battery electric motorcycle)
- Dirt eBike X160 (battery electric motorcycle)

Powersports

ATV: AT5 S, AT5 L, AT6 S, AT6 L
UTV: UT10, UT10 Crew
SSV (SxS): SX10 - E, SX10 - X, SX10 - WIDE, SX20 - TURBO, SX20 - HYBRID

Ninebot

- E300SE (battery electric motorcycle)
- E110S (battery electric motorcycle)
- E125S (battery electric motorcycle)

== Technology ==
The dynamics of the Segway PT are similar to a classic control problem, the inverted pendulum. It uses brushless DC electric motors in each wheel powered by lithium-ion batteries with balance achieved using tilt sensors, and gyroscopic sensors developed by BAE Systems' Advanced Technology Centre.

== Usage ==
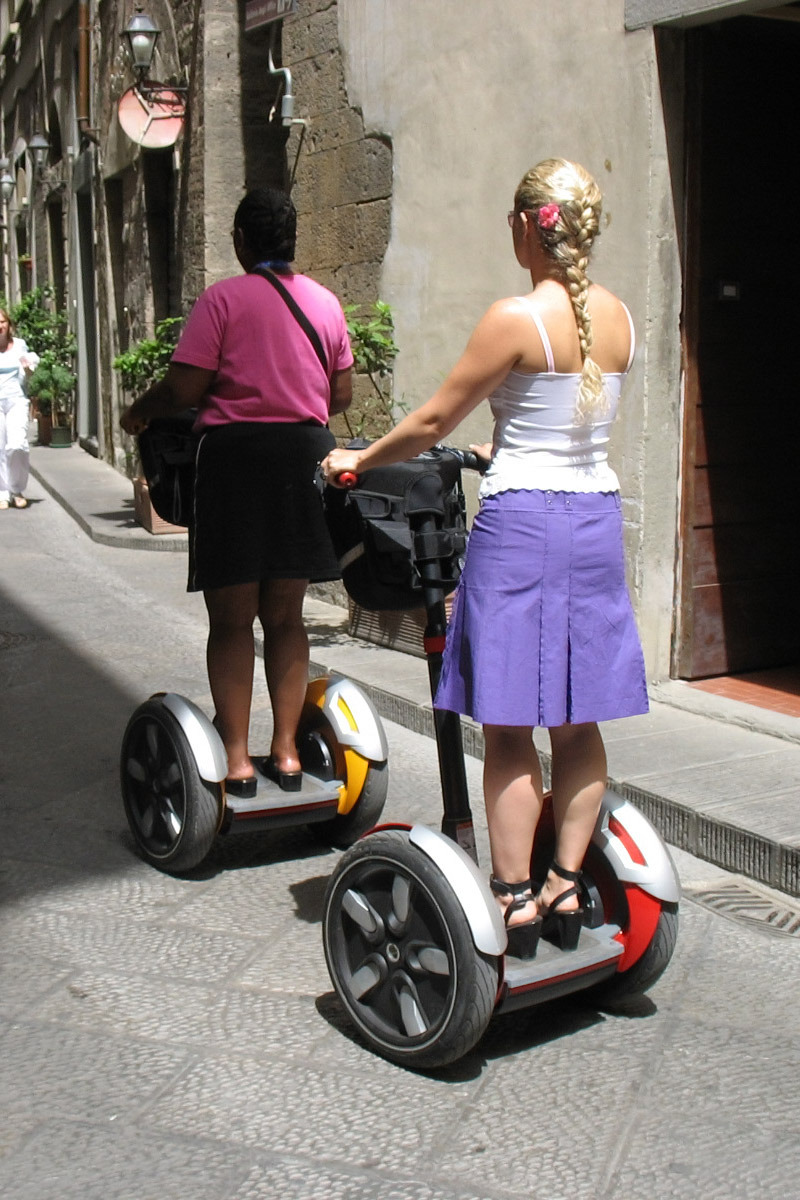
Two tourists on a Segway tour in Florence, Italy

The special police forces trained to protect the public during the 2008 Summer Olympics used the Segway for mobility.

In 2011, the Segway i2 was being marketed to the emergency medical services community.

In 2018, the police of Stockholm adopted Segway i2 as a transportation method for the patrollers of the old town.

== See also ==
- Jonathan Gleich
- Segway polo – Team sport played on Segways
