= Single-track vehicle =

Vehicle that leaves a single ground track as it moves forward

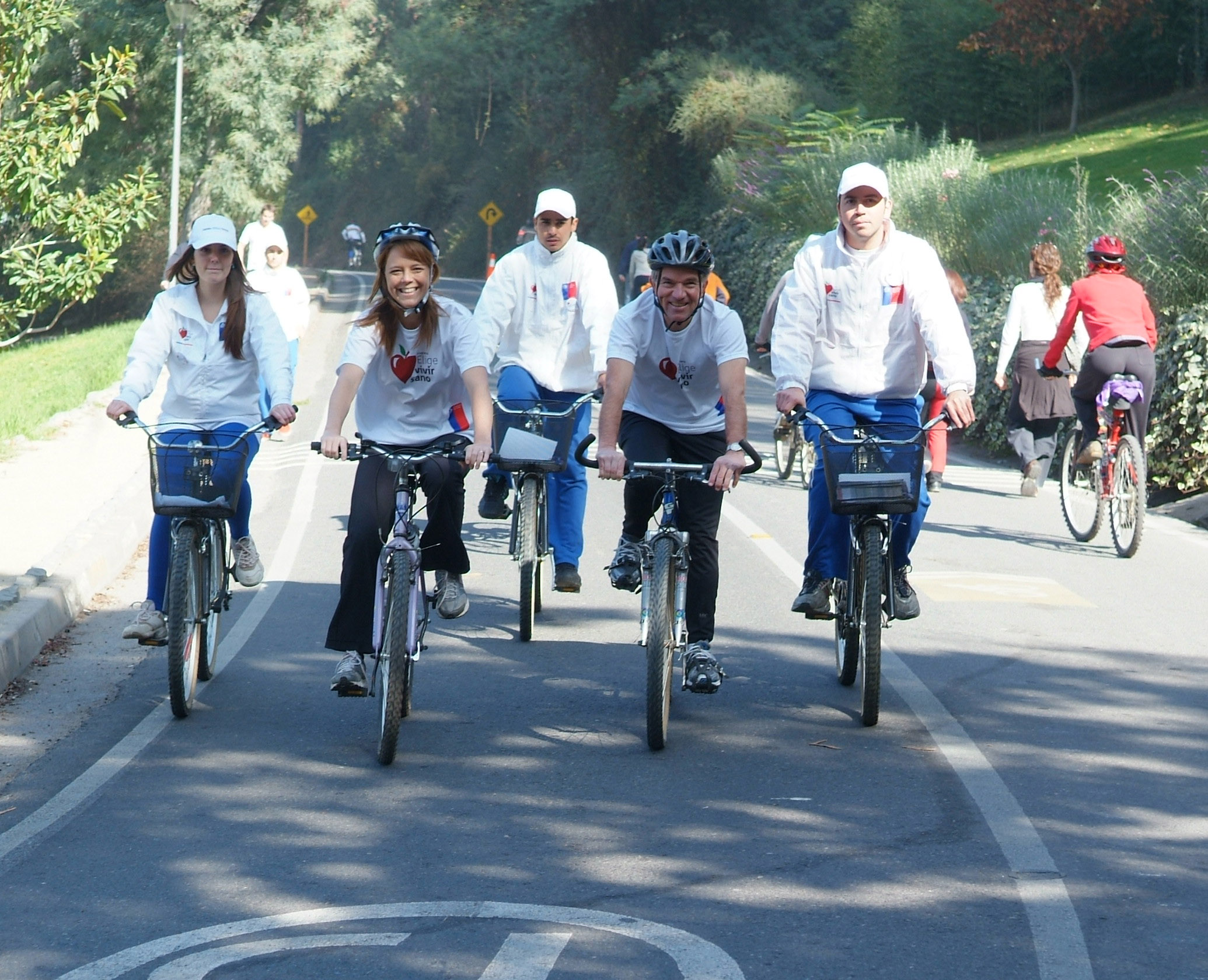
Cyclists on bicycles

A single-track vehicle is a vehicle that leaves a single ground track as it moves forward. Single-track vehicles usually have little or no lateral stability when stationary but develop it when moving forward or controlled. In the case of wheeled vehicles, the front and rear wheel usually follow slightly different paths when turning or when out of alignment.

Single-track vehicles have unique dynamics that, in the case of wheeled vehicles, are discussed at length in bicycle and motorcycle dynamics, that usually require leaning into a turn, and that usually include countersteering. Single-track vehicles can roll on wheels, slide, float, or hydroplane.

== Wheeled ==
- bicycle, tandem bicycle, tall bike, and recumbent bicycle
- motorcycle, scooter, and feet forward motorcycle
- gyrocar and gyro monorail
- kick scooter
- unicycle, self-balancing unicycle, Uno (dicycle), and monowheel
- inline skate and roller ski (when only one is in contact with the ground or when the second follows behind the first)

== Sliding ==
- the snowboard and monoski
- the skirider
- the ice skate (when only one is in contact with the ice or when the second follows behind the first)

== Intermittent contact ==
- the pogo stick
- the bipedal robot

== Hydroplaning ==
- the slalom water ski
- the wakeboard

== Narrow-track vehicle ==
A vehicle is approximately single-track when the axle track is small enough with respect to the center of mass height to require leaning into a turn. Countersteering may or may not be required.

- the skateboard and all its varieties, such as the snakeboard
- the surfboard
- the caster board (when the rear wheel closely follows the front wheel)
- the Uno dicycle

== See also ==
- Dicycle
- List of land vehicles types by number of wheels
