= List of land vehicles types by number of wheels =

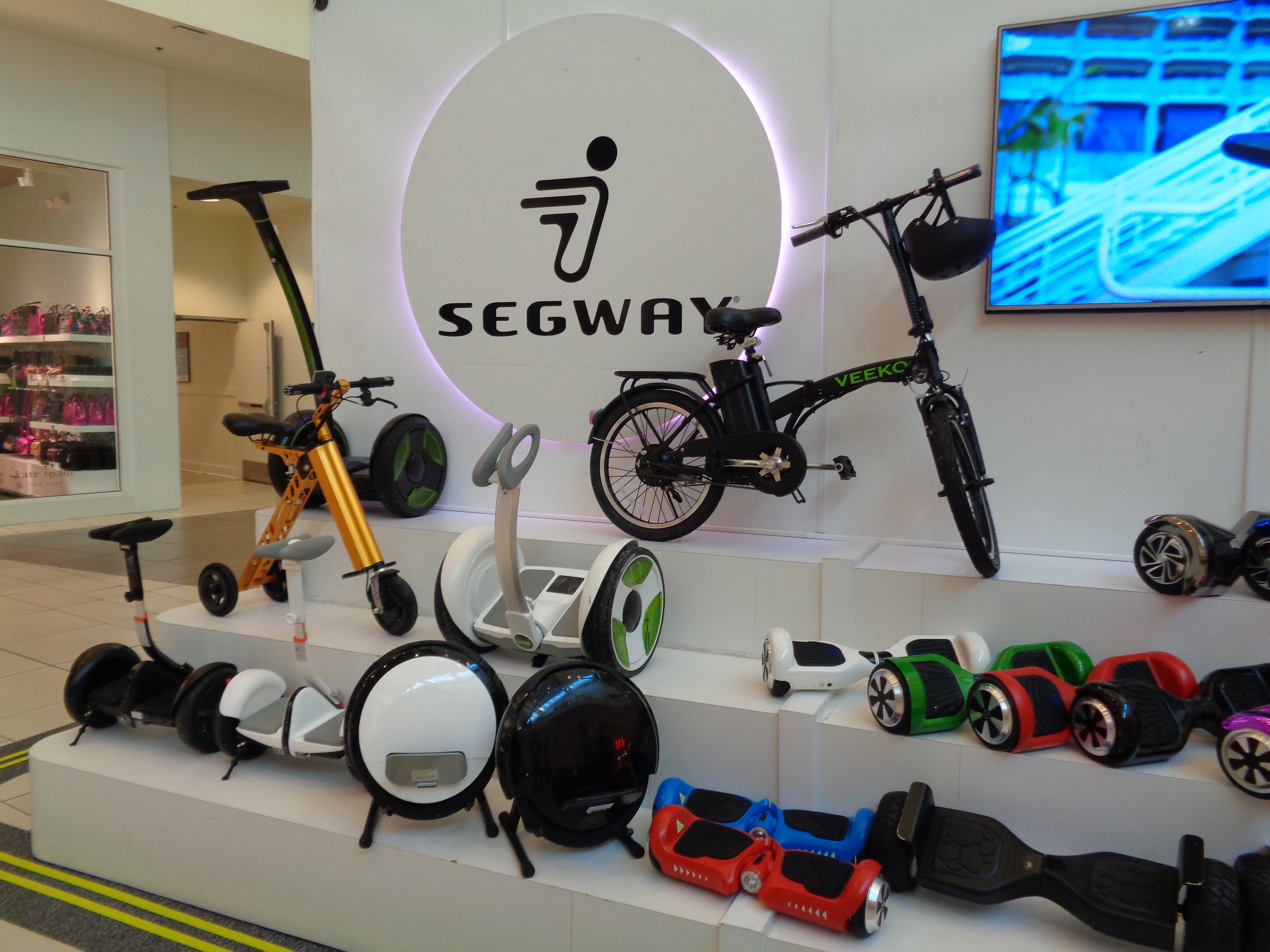
Electric unicycles, tricycle, bicycle and dicycles

This is a list of land vehicles by their number of wheels. The number of wheels a land vehicle has can vary widely, from zero to many. The number of wheels a vehicle has can have a significant impact on its stability, manoeuvrability, and performance. This list aims to provide an overview of the various types of land vehicles categorized by their number of wheels.

== 0 ==
- Hovercraft
- Litter (vehicle)
- Pogo Stick
- Sled
- Snowboard
- Snowmobile
- Space hopper
- Hoverboard

== 1 ==
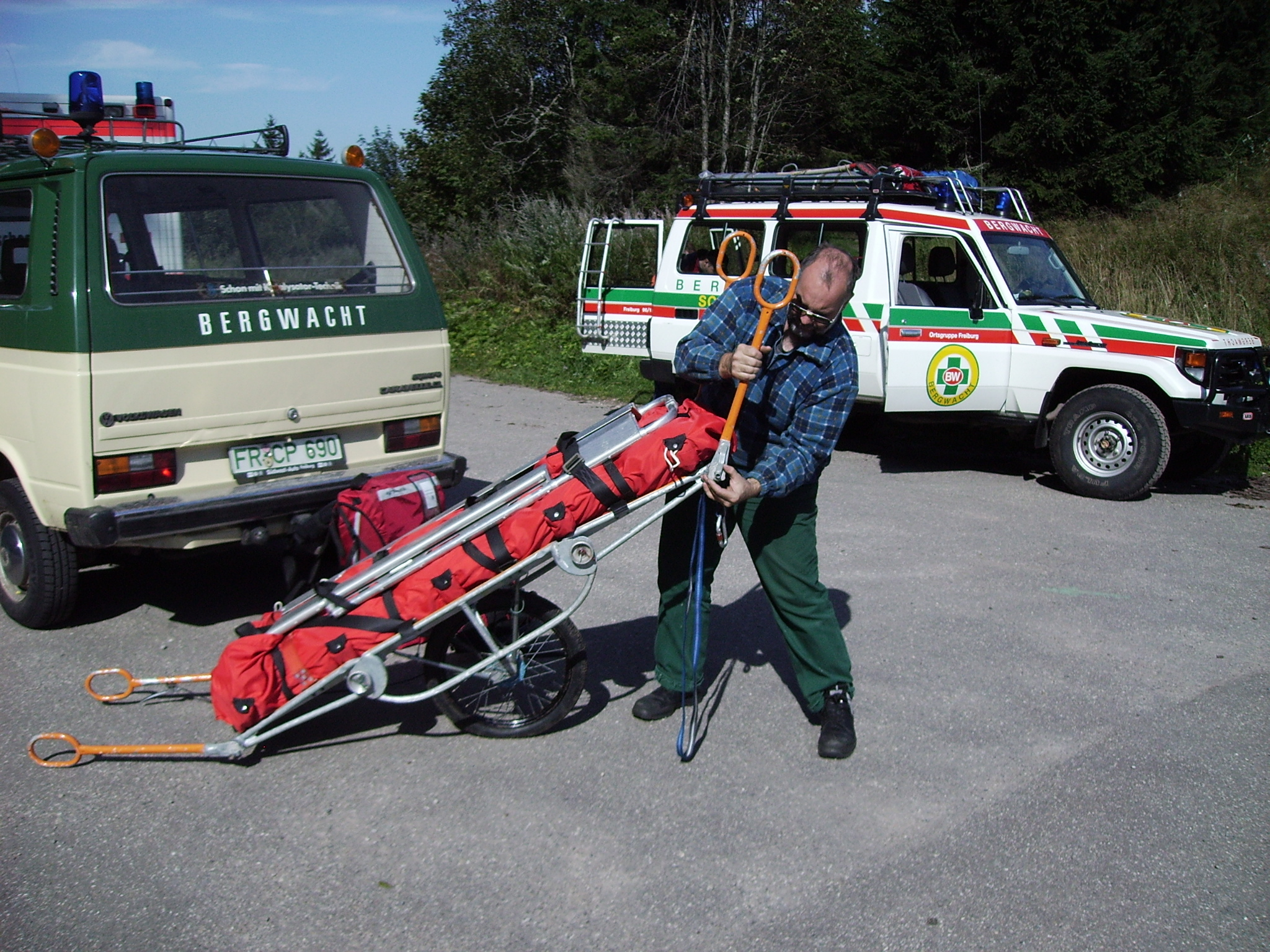
Litter wheel

- Unicycle
- Electric unicycle
- Heelys
- Litter wheel
- Monowheel
- Onewheel
- Traditional western wheelbarrow
  - Wooden ox/Chinese wheelbarrow

== 2 ==
- Wheels in parallel
  - Cart
    - Pulled rickshaw
    - Hansom cab
    - Sulky
    - Tilbury (carriage)
  - Dicycle
    - Segway
    - Self-balancing scooter
  - Hand truck
  - Shopping caddy
- Wheels in tandem
  - Bicycle
    - Motorized bicycle
      - Electric bicycle
    - Penny-farthing
    - Recumbent bicycle
    - Safety bicycle
    - Cargo bike
  - Caster board
  - Chukudu
  - Gyrocar/Bi-Autogo

== at least 2 ==
- A continuous track vehicle needs at minimum two wheels in order to work, but the majority have more than two
- Most wheeled suitcases have at least 2 wheels; some may have more
- Inline skates
- Kick scooter
  - Kickbike
- Motorized scooter
  - Autoped
  - E-scooter

== 2–3 ==
- Motorcycle (Usually 2 wheels but sometimes 3)
  - Cabin motorcycle
- Handcycle
- Rollator

== 3 ==
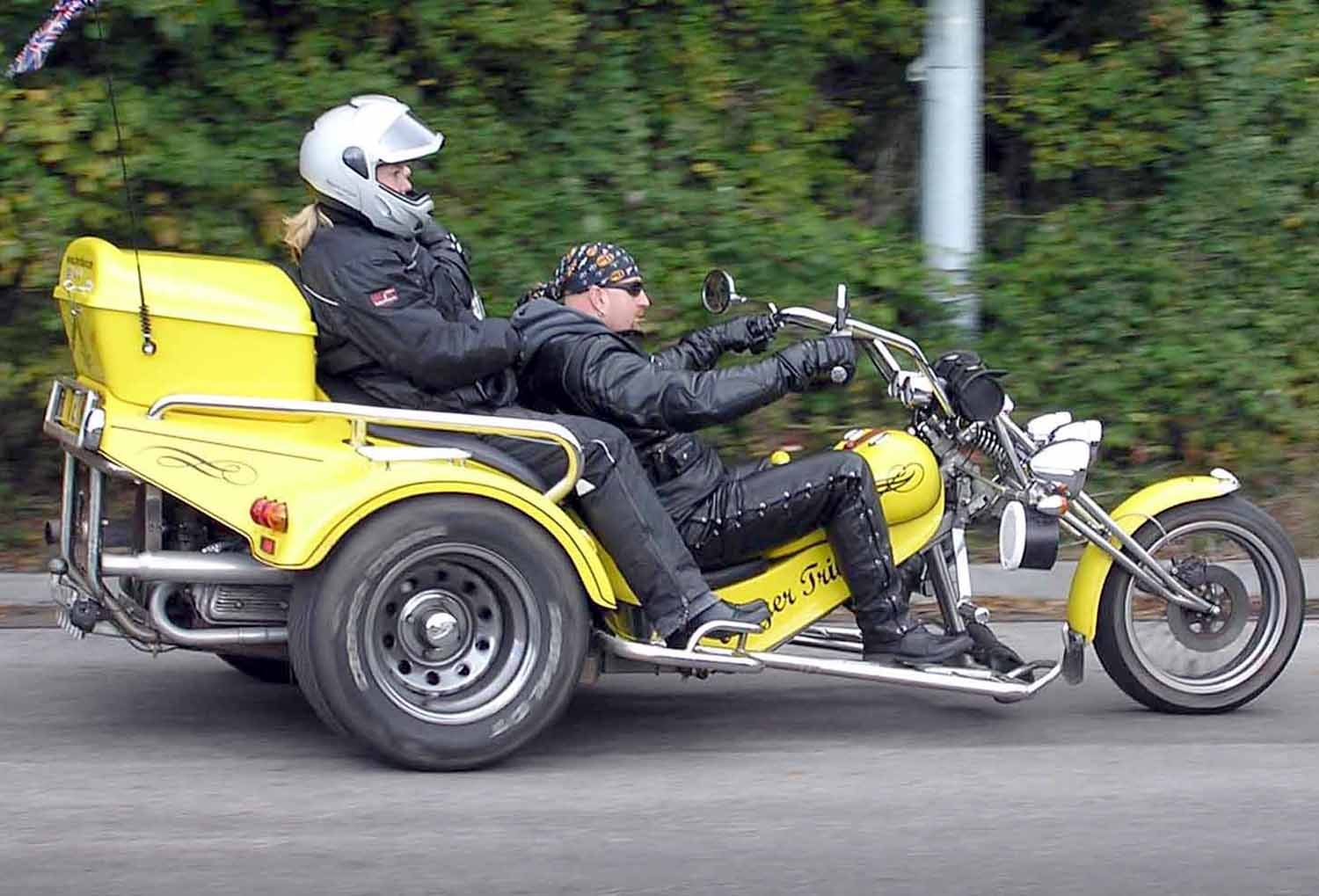
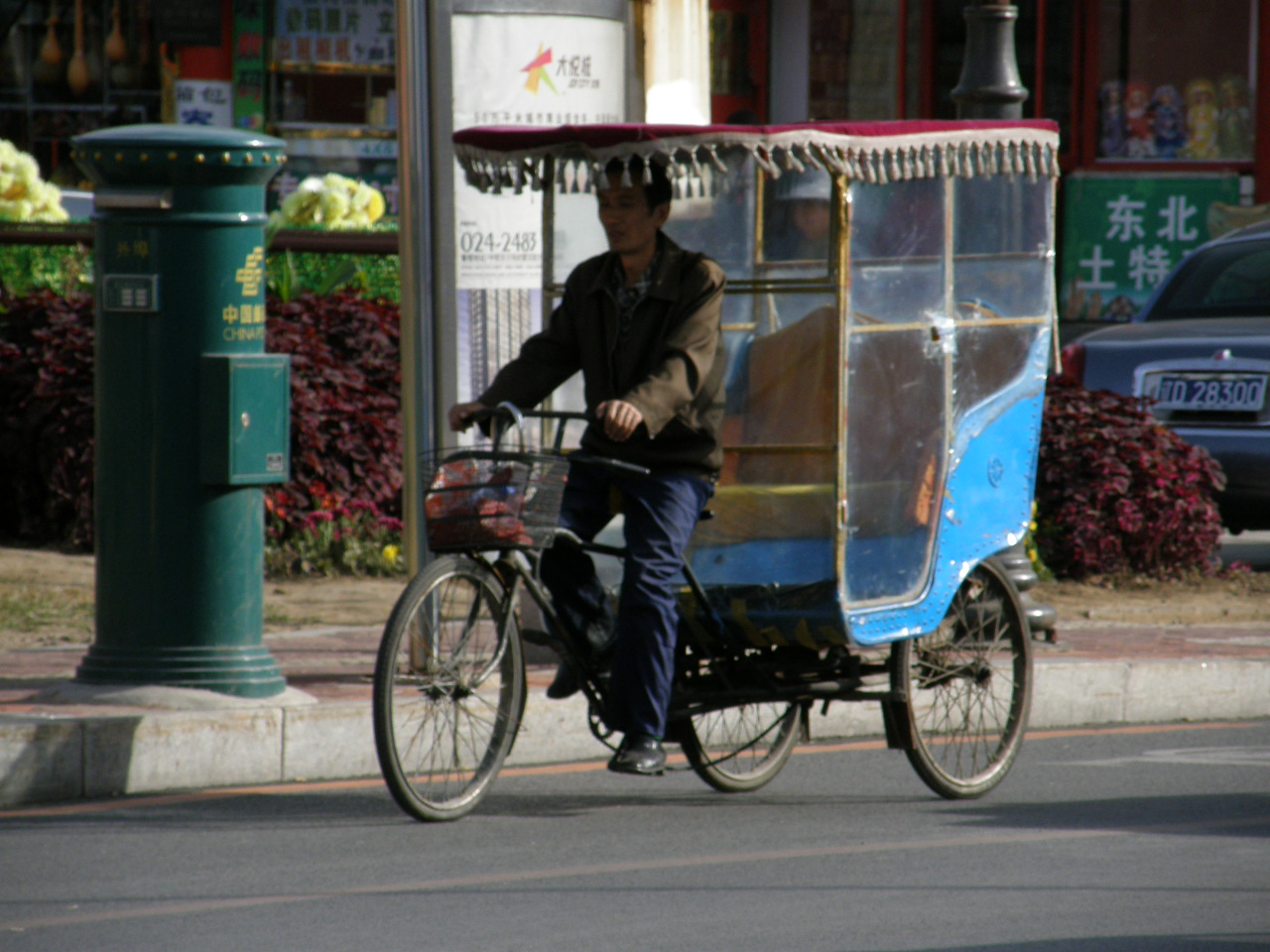
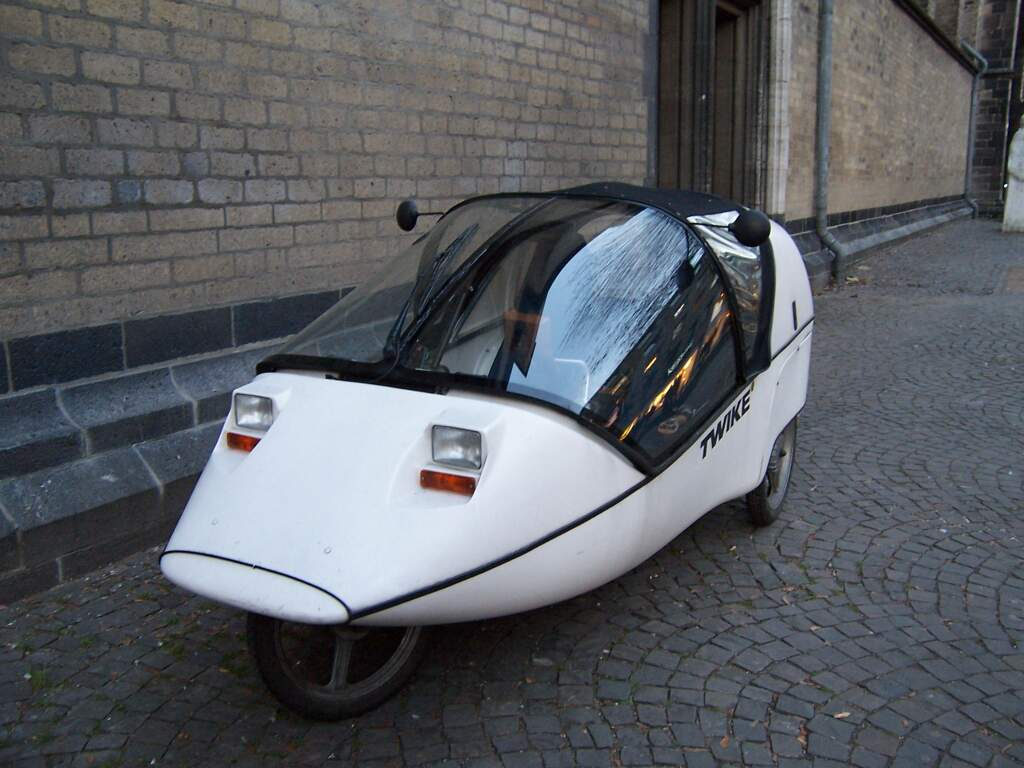
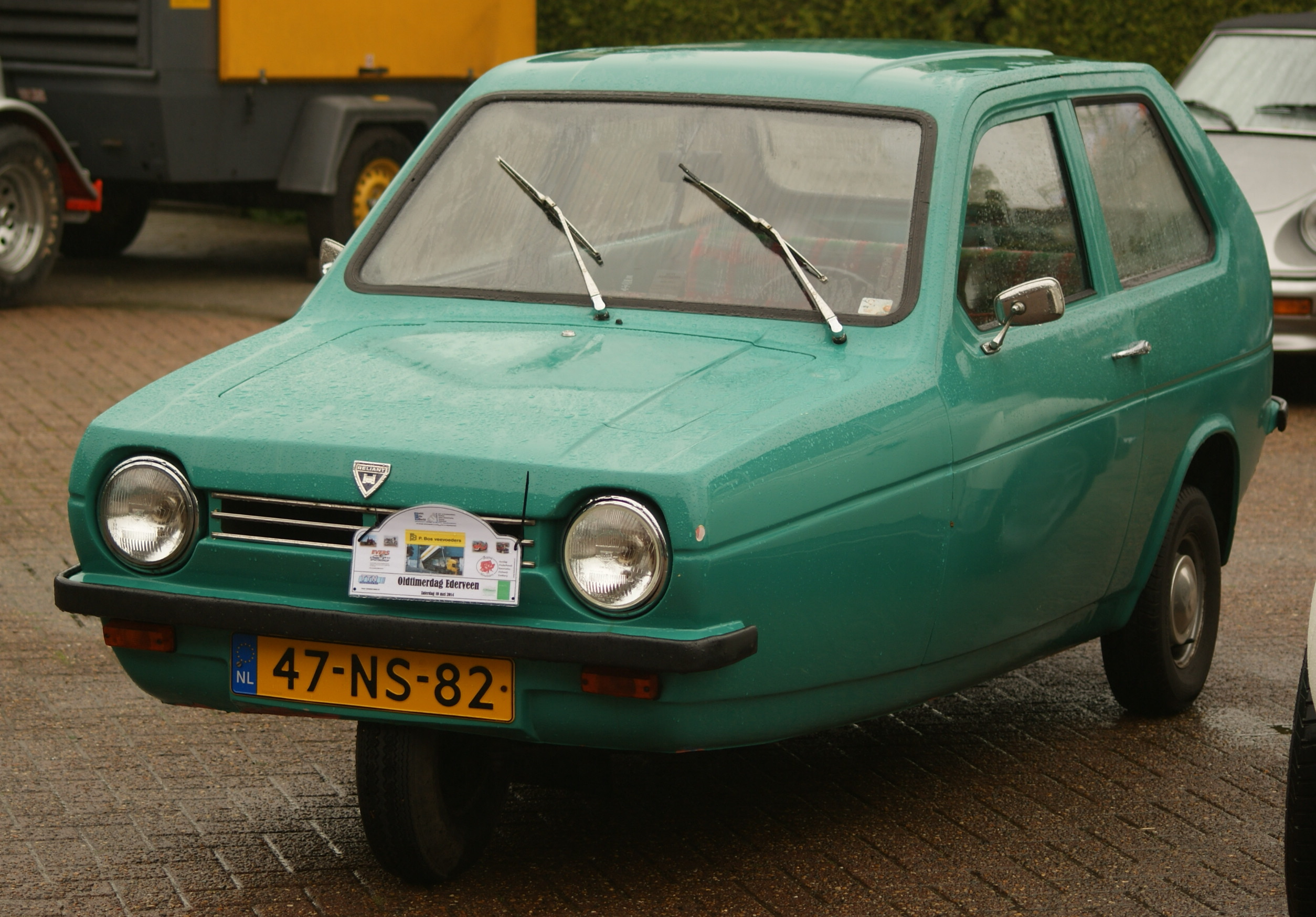
Motorized tricycle, Cycle rickshaw, twike velomobile, Reliant Robin
- Bath chair
- Modern land sailing vehicles
- Motorcycle with sidecar (typically 3 wheels overall)
- Pallet jack
- Racing wheelchair
- Tricycle
  - Cycle rickshaw
  - Motorized tricycle
    - Steam tricycle
    - Whike
- Three-wheeler
  - Tilting three-wheeler
  - Forecar
- Trikke
- Twike
- Ultralight trike

== 3-4 ==
- Microcar
  - Cyclecar

== 4 ==
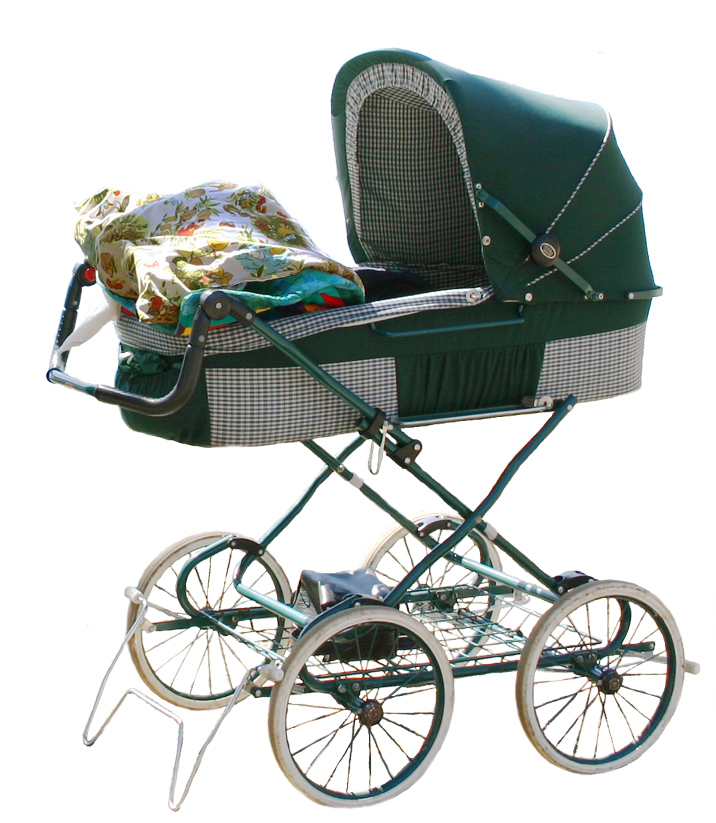
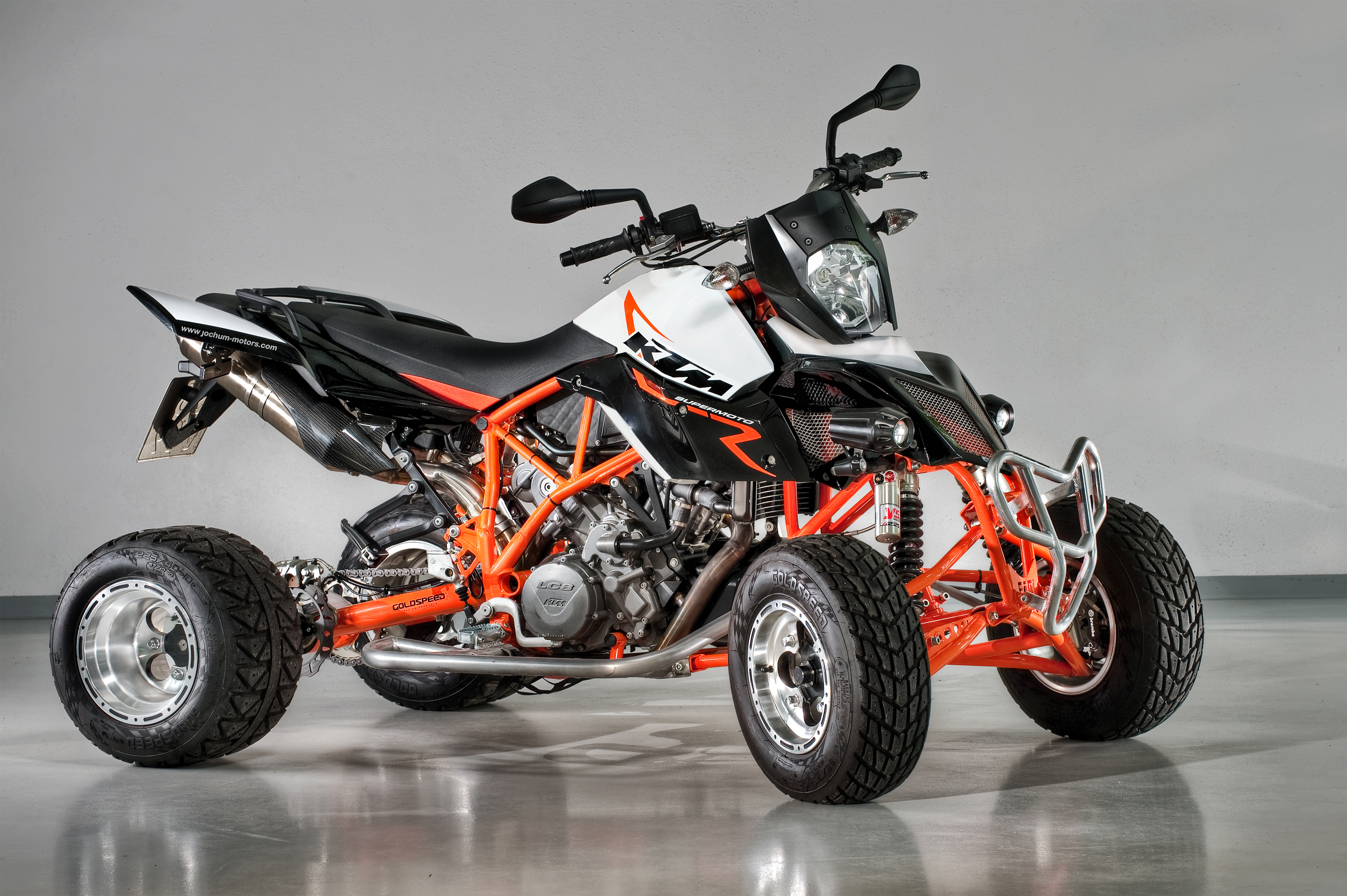
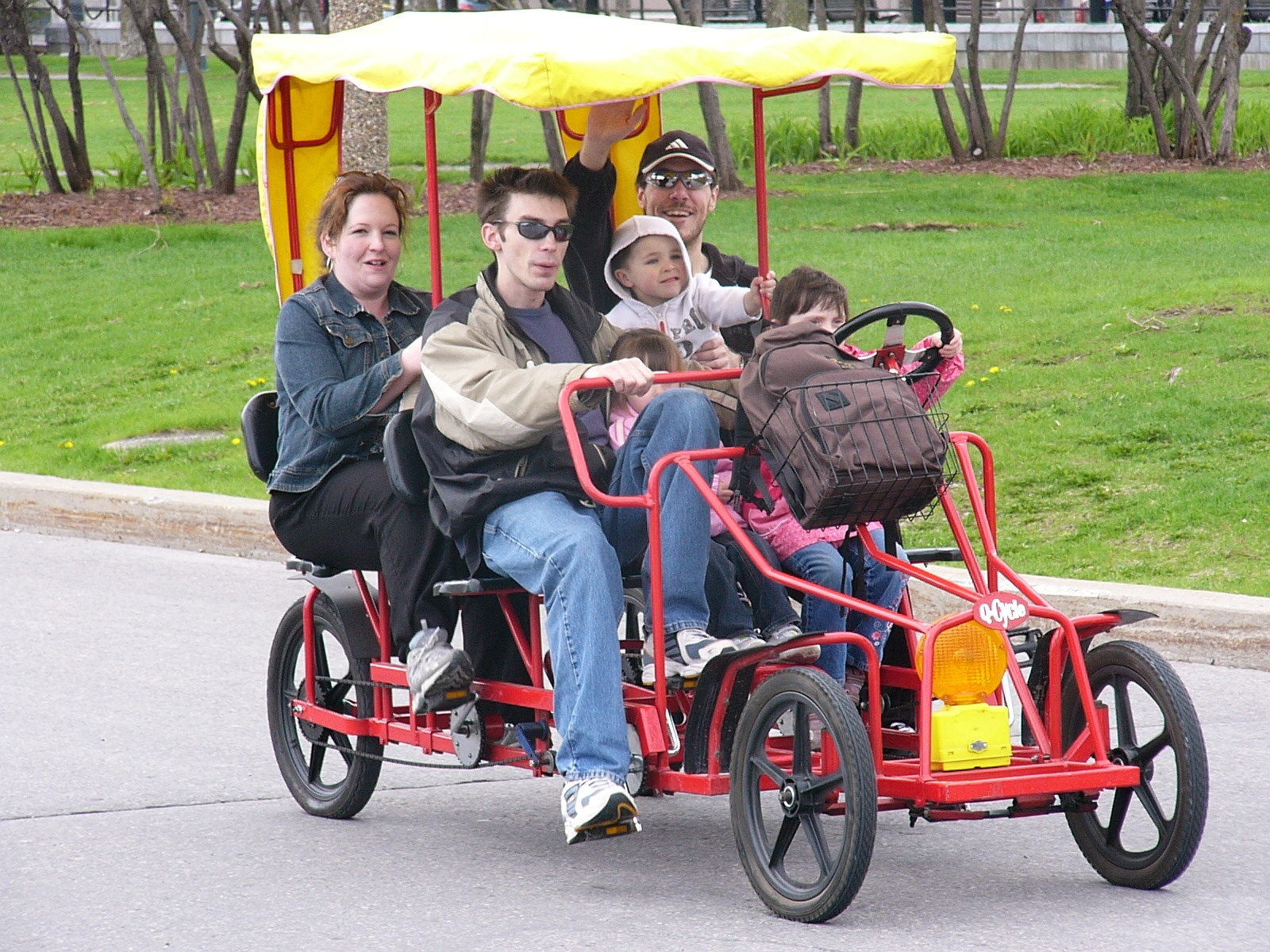
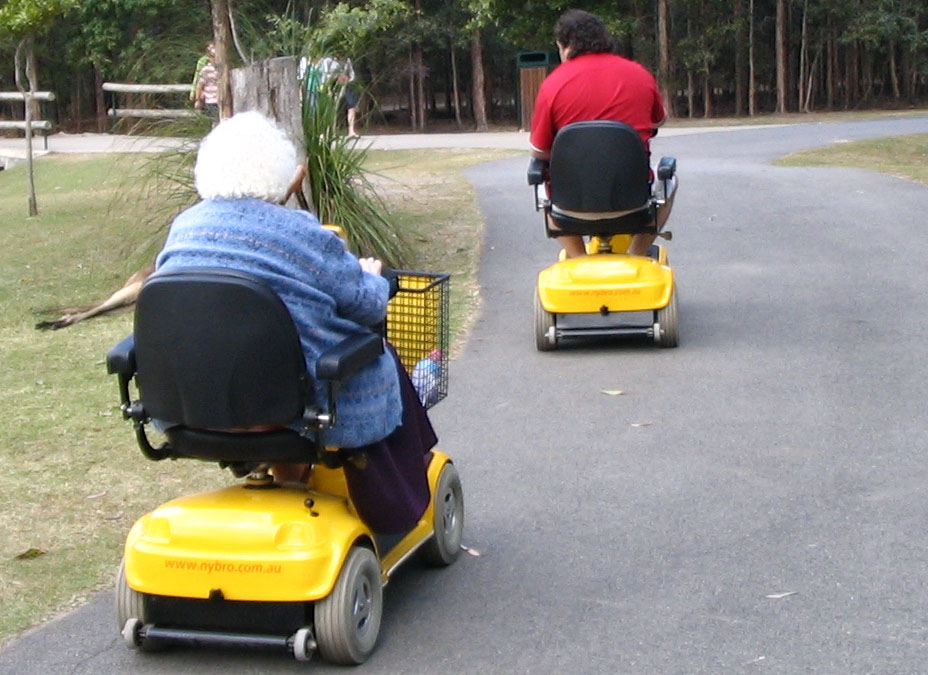
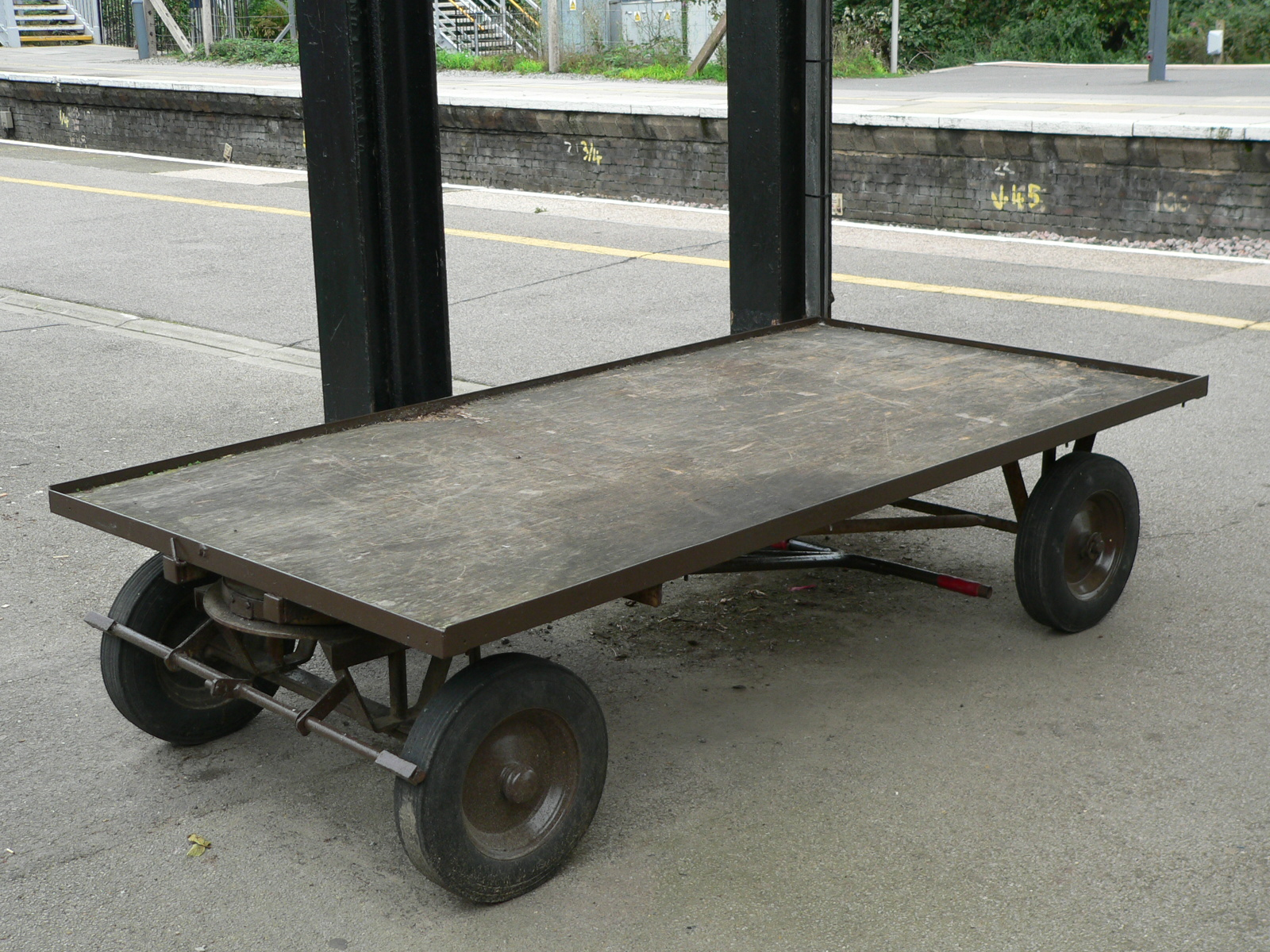
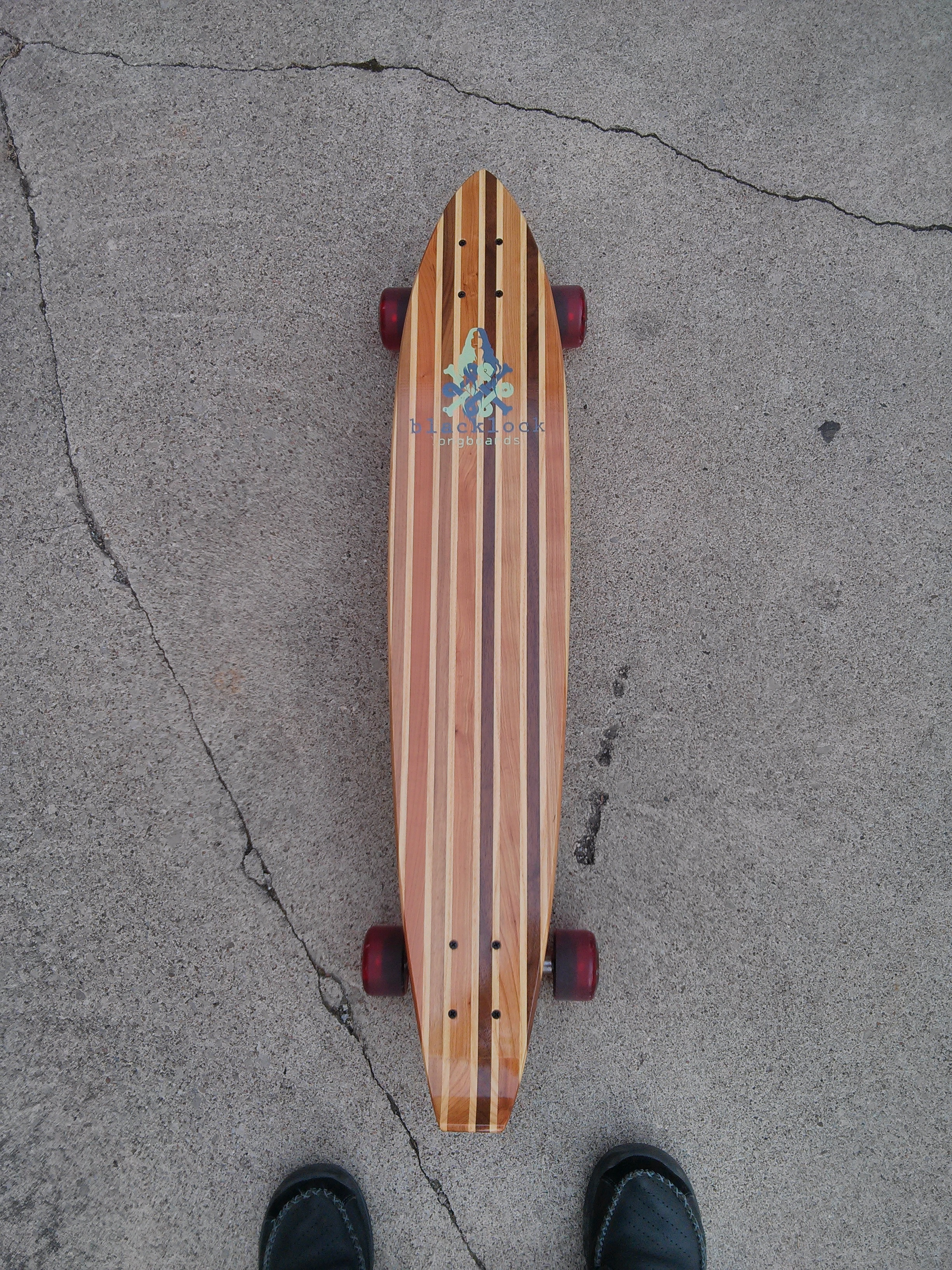
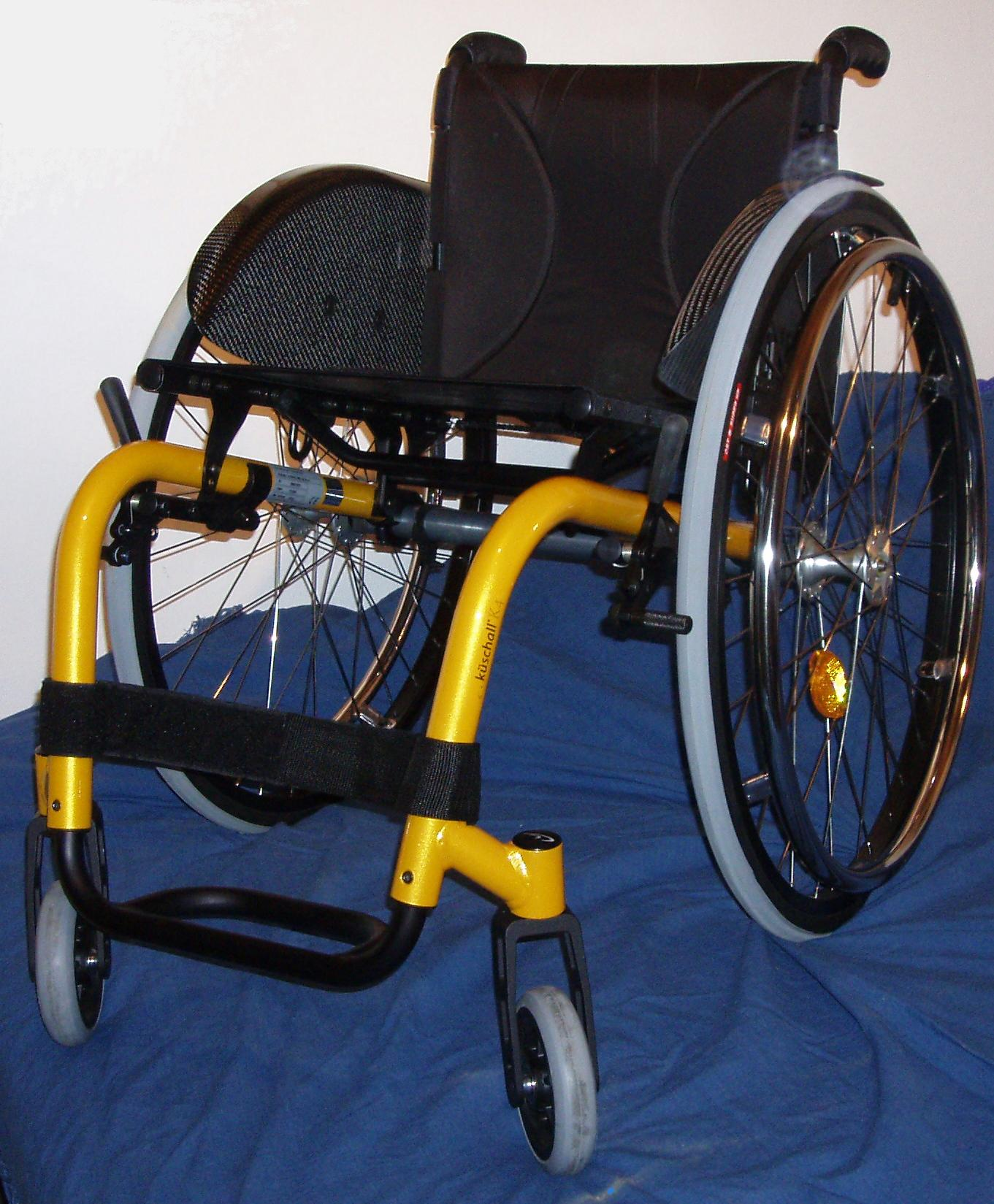
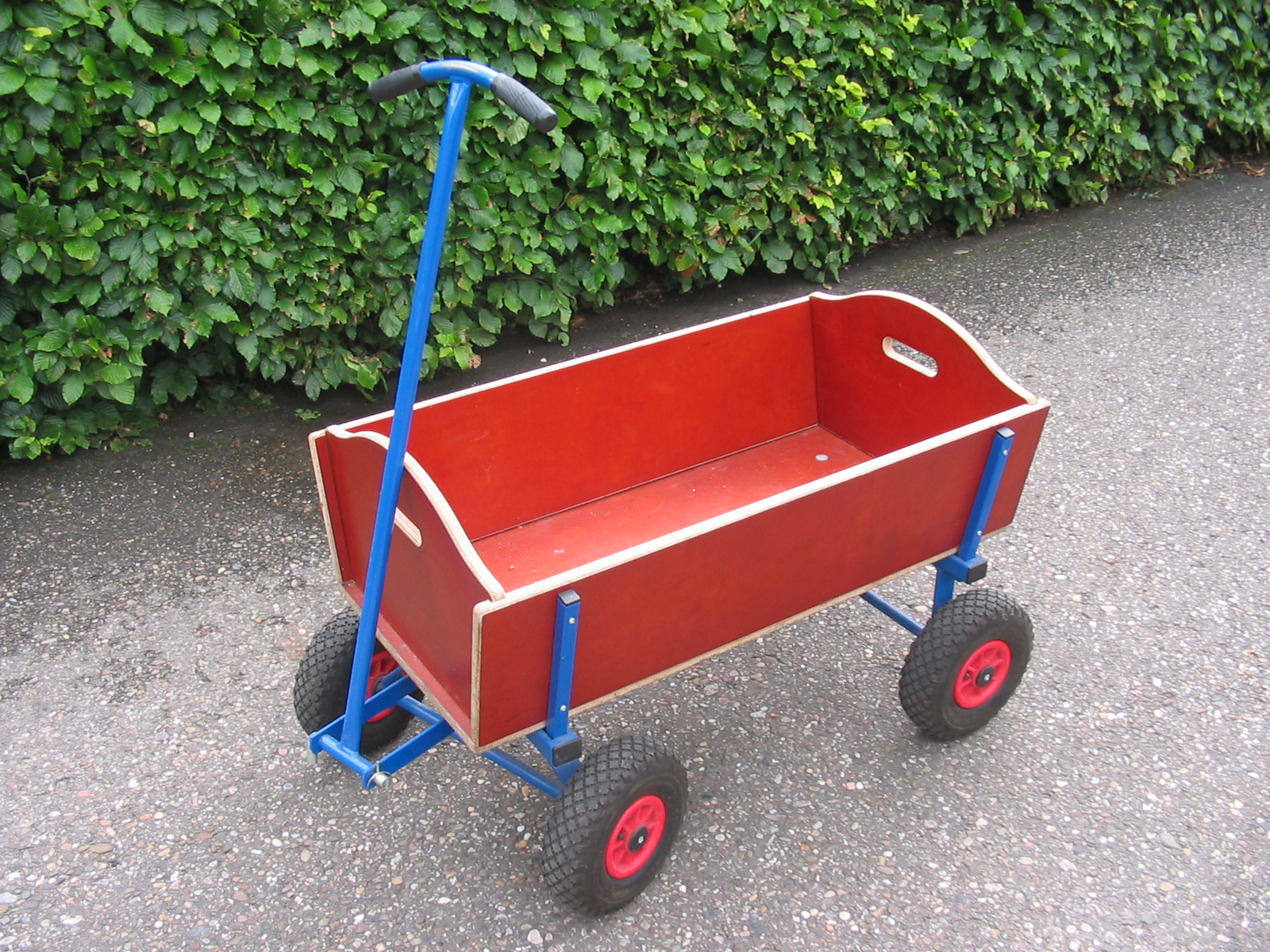
Pram, car, ATV, quadracycle, mobility scooter, flatbed trolley, skateboard, wheelchair, caravan, toy wagon
- All-terrain vehicle (four-wheeler)
- The majority of automobiles
- Baby transport
- Quadricycle
- Quadracycle
  - Go kart
- Golf cart (motorised)
- Flatbed trolley
- Forklift
- Four-wheeler
- Knee scooter
- Mobility scooter
- Model car
- Pallet jack
- Recreational vehicle
- Riding mower
- Roller skates
- Serving cart
- Soapbox racer
- Skateboard
  - Snakeboard
  - Longboard
- Toy wagon
- Velomobile
- Wagon
  - Shopping cart
- Wheelchair

== More than 4 ==
- Pentacycle
- Six-wheel drive vehicle (6x6)
- Eight-wheel drive vehicle (8x8)
- Ten-wheel drive vehicle (10x10)
- Twelve-wheel drive vehicle (12x12)
- 18 wheeler
- Many tracked vehicles such as tanks
- Most rolling stock have more than four wheels, due to trucks having four wheels each, with multiple trucks per vehicle being common

== See also ==
- Wheels
- Wheel and axle
- Rim
- Tires
- Single-track vehicle
- Tracked vehicles
- Vehicle category
