= Pentacycle =

Human-powered vehicle with five wheels

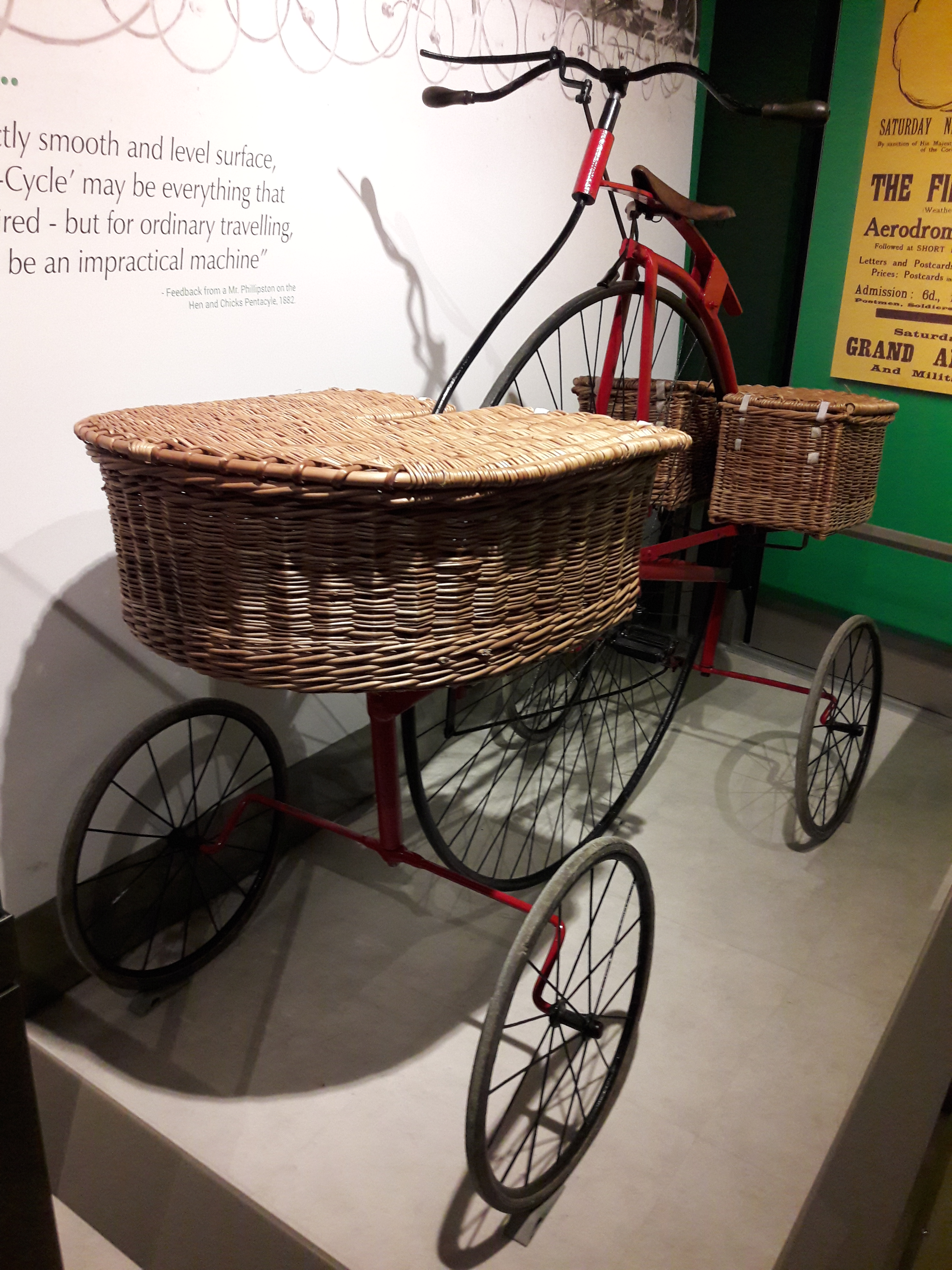
Hen and Chick pentacycle for delivering mail. Trialled in 1882.

A pentacycle ("hen and chickens") is a human-powered five-wheeled vehicle.

== Origin ==
The original pentacycle was designed and patented by the architect Edward Burstow in 1882. It had a large central wheel directly driven by pedals like a penny-farthing bicycle, with a "bath-chair type handle", and four smaller wheels for stability. This arrangement led to it being referred to as the "hen and chickens" cycle, as it resembled a mother hen surrounded by her four chicks. It was trialled by rural postmen in Horsham and, although liked, the design was not widely adopted. There is a replica in the British Postal Museum.

== Modern-day interpretation ==
Modern-day pentacycles do not often share the same layout as the original pentacycle, usually using various other wheel configurations.

A 2002 interpretation, specifically designed to use the disused Aérotrain monorail track near Orléans, is more accurately described as a tricycle; although it has five wheels, two are actually used for guidance and are placed on either side of the monorail support.

In 2012, Sajjad Moosa, a Pakistani art graduate, spent almost ₹150,000 (US$1,800) creating a 48 foot (15 m) long pentacycle using a single front wheel for steering, a middle pair of wheels for drive and another pair at the rear.

== See also ==
- Unicycle
- Bicycle
- Tricycle
- Quadricycle
- List of land vehicles types by number of wheels
