= RIOT wheel =

One-wheeled vehicle

A RIOT wheel is a one-wheeled vehicle, or monowheel. A motor and counterweight are housed inside a giant wheel, while the driver sits on a platform that extends out in front of the device. This is in contrast to the more typical monowheels and their long history, where the rider sits inside the wheel.

By moving the wheel's center of gravity forward, the wheel turns. Inside is a lead-weighted engine, which hangs by bearings off a stationary center shaft and uses its torque to move from 0 degrees vertical when stationary to 90 degrees forward at full blast, continually pulling itself forward around a sprocket bolted to the outer spokes. An independent counterweight system keeps the driver floating gently above ground from the front, instead of inside the wheel, where most monowheel designs position them. Steering is handled by a gyroscopic system and the driver's shifting weight.

== History ==
Part-time programmer and Renaissance Fair jouster Jake Lyall had never worked for a garage, studied engineering, or even held a welder before he built the RIOT Wheel. Lyall spent $5,000 and 900 hours building a massive 1,100-pound motorized monowheel. The RIOT Wheel (which stands for Reinvention of the Wheel) reaches a top speed of about 28 mph. So far Lyall has no commercial designs on the project, which debuted at 2003's Burning Man Festival. He hopes that a refined electric version will break the monowheel land-speed record of 57 mph.

Since the creation of the RIOT wheel, there have been 2 more designed RIOT 2 and RIOT 3. RIOT 2 utilizes a hybrid/electric engine and is mostly aluminum which makes it weigh significantly less. Its gyro is better designed, so it is more effective, while lighter and faster. The RIOT 3 is solely designed for beating the world single-wheel land-speed record. It is powered by a Kostov DC electric motor, which can (for short periods) produce 200 hp. Many electric vehicles have weight problems due to the batteries they utilize, and are slower because of that. The RIOT 3 however, is able to use the weight to its advantage.

== See also ==
- Unicycle
- Dicycle (vehicle)
