= Ben Gulak =

Ukrainian Canadian inventor (born 1989)

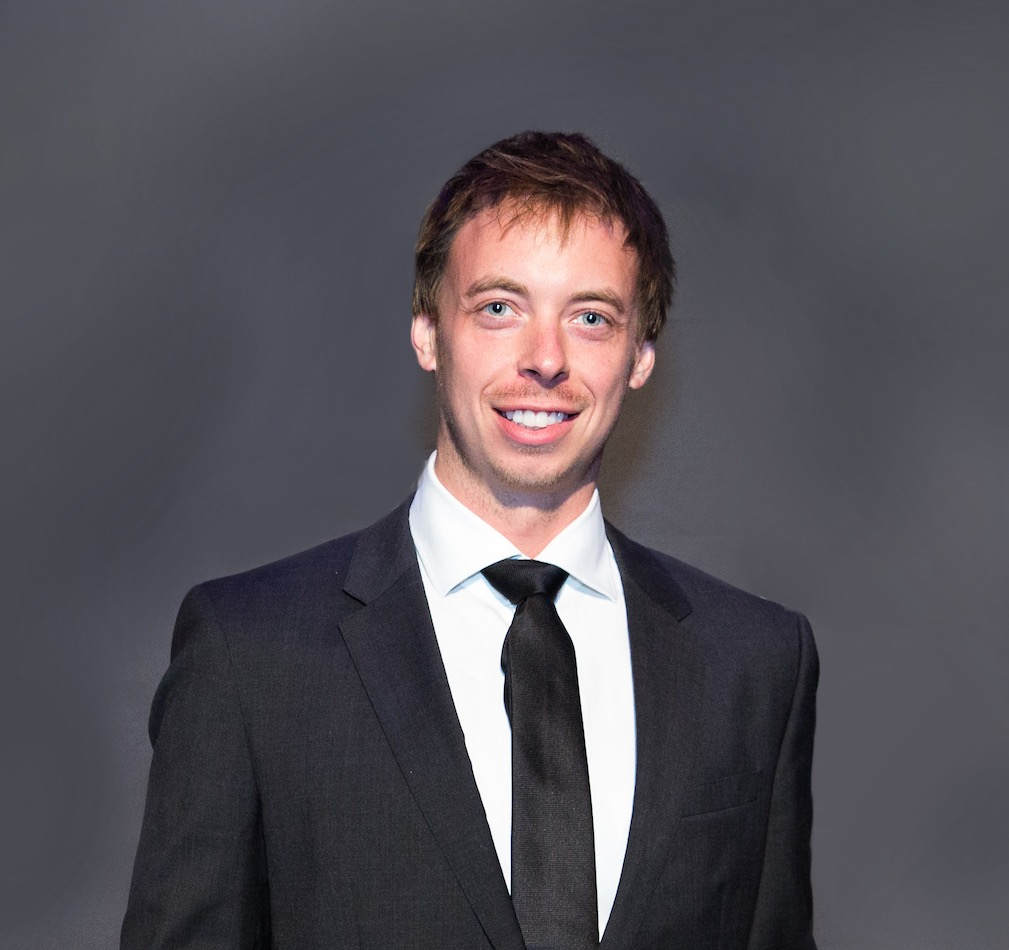
- Interview photo taken at Edison Awards
- Born: 1989 (age 36–37); Milton, Ontario, Canada
- Education: Massachusetts Institute of Technology
- Known for: Inventor of The Uno, DTV Shredder
- Awards: Canada's Top 20 Under 20, Gold Edison Award, Popular Science Magazine Invention of The Year 2008
- Website: bpgulak.com

Ben Gulak (born 1989) is a Ukrainian Canadian inventor and entrepreneur best known for creating the Uno, an eco-friendly, electric-powered vehicle that bears a resemblance to a motorized unicycle. The vehicle had its first public unveiling in 2008, and was awarded a Top-10 prize on Popular Science's list of 2008 Invention Awards. Gulak founded the Massachusetts-based company BPG Motors, which has also developed a design for the DTV (dual-tracked vehicle) Shredder, a portable all-terrain vehicle with the handlebars of a Segway and treads similar to those of a tank. In 2020, he founded NALA, a data science-driven platform for artists.

== Early life ==
Benjamin J. Poss Gulak was born in 1989 in Milton, Ontario. He is the only child of Ken and Sylvie Gulak. His father is in the food business, and his mother is a psychotherapist. Gulak's grandfather was a design engineer, and at a young age Gulak would help his grandfather tinker in his basement machine shop. He spent much of his childhood making model trains, rockets, and other projects, and was a fan of inventor Nikola Tesla. His grandfather died in 2003, and Gulak inherited the machine shop.

In ninth grade, he entered a school science fair with a "real simple magnetic car that shot around a track using accelerator coils." He ended up being chosen to represent Canada on an International Level on Team Canada, which consists of 18 people competing against 54 other countries. According to Gulak, his classes subsequently suffered as he frequently skipped school to work on further science fair projects. In 2005, he entered in McMaster Engineering's summer L.E.A.P. program, where he was a team leader in the robotics program and helped the team win a robot-building competition.

== BPG Motors ==
=== The Uno ===
While a senior in highschool in 2006, Gulak began working on a design for the Uno following a trip to China with his father. After witnessing major smog pollution caused by heavy use of small motor vehicles, he decided he wanted to create an eco-friendly alternative to submit to a science fair. According to Gulak, "I wanted it to be something small enough to store indoors: you could bring it up to your apartment to plug in and charge, and then you could ride it around on the road." His first designs were on Google SketchUp.

His initial design efforts consisted of an iron frame with wheelchair motors, batteries and gyroscopes. He described his first test-ride as "absolutely terrifying" and resulting in a crash and a chipped kneecap. Other early problems, including a series of electrical fires, arose. He was then joined by California-based Canadian robotics expert Trevor Blackwell, and together they refined the Uno's gyro control system so the machine would properly balance and move smoothly. Gulak then used the revised plans to develop a prototype vehicle with the help of various partners. The Uno is an electric-powered vehicle that bears a resemblance to a motorized unicycle. Described in news reports as either a "one wheeled motorcycle" or "electric unicycle", it is more accurately a dicycle, created by placing two closely spaced wheels side by side at the centre-point of the vehicle. He began building the prototype at a motorcycle shop outside Toronto.

He entered his first Uno through Team Canada during the 2008 international science fair. The vehicle had its first public unveiling at the Toronto Spring Motorcycle Show in 2008, and was awarded a Top-10 prize on Popular Science's list of 2008 Invention Awards In an episode of the CBC series Dragons' Den, Gulak obtained $1,250,000 of venture capital for a 20% share in further development of the Uno cycle. At the time, it was the largest deal in the show's history. He also appeared on The Tonight Show with Jay Leno to talk about the project.

He put off attending MIT for a year to work on the project, raising funds and moving to Boston to open a small office in Cambridge. He started the company BPG Motors to develop the motorcycle. He enrolled in MIT in fall of 2008.

=== The Shredder ===
At age 22 while at MIT, Gulak partnered with Ryan Fairhead to create the DTV Shredder, an all-terrain vehicle. According to Gulak, "In a recession it doesn't make sense to have to buy an expensive snowmobile that you can ride for three months of the year and an all-terrain vehicle that you can ride for four months of the year. Ryan wanted to make something small enough that you could fit it in the back of any car. And He wanted it to be something you'd be able to ride all year, whether in snow, sand, or mud." The small vehicle has Segway-like handlebars, wheels similar to tank treads, and can tow up to 400 pounds.

The vehicle became popular with X Games fans. In late 2010, Gulak posted some videos of a prototype online, which by the next day had accumulated 50,000 hits, and a million hits within a week. Some bloggers assumed it was a new military device, while Gulak claims it was also intended as an extreme sports vehicle.
