= Quadricycle =

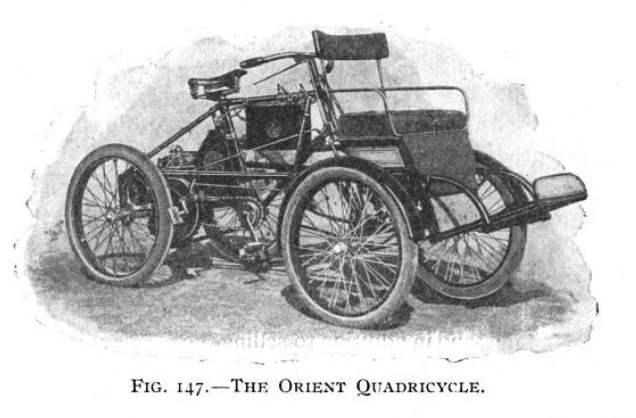
Quadricycle, was a popular term for human or motorized four wheel bike-like vehicles around the turn of the 19th to 20th century

The Quadricycle may be

- an early form of automobile or voiturette. Earliest models were propelled by a small steam engine, then designers switched to early internal combustion engines as they became available. The word is derived from the fact that it had four wheels and used technology derived from the bicycles of the era.
  - 1884 De Dion Bouton "La Marquise" Quadricycle (Steam runabout)
  - 1889 Daimler Quadricycle
  - 1901 Peugeot Type 2, a direct descendant of the Daimler Quadricycle, and the first automobile of the Peugeot company
  - Peugeot Type 3 Quadricycle
  - 1896 Ford Quadricycle, Henry Ford's first automobile design
  - Duryea Motor Wagon
  - Benz Velo
- Quadricycle, quadracycle, quadcycle, quadrocycle and quad all refer to vehicles with four wheels. More specifically these terms may refer to:
  - All-terrain vehicle, also known as quad or quad bike
  - Motorized quadcycle, a motorcycle with four wheels
  - Automobile, the first experimental steam automobiles were termed steam quadricycles
  - Low-speed vehicle, referred to in some countries as a quadricycle
  - Quadricycle, European classifications for light four-wheeled motorized vehicles: light quadricycles, category L6e (a quadricycle is a 4-wheel car that cannot go faster than 45 km/h (28 mph), weighs less than 425 kg (937 lb)), and (heavy) quadricycles, category L7e ;
- Quadracycle, a four-wheeled style of cycle

== See also ==
- Cyclecar
- Horse and buggy
- Horseless carriage/Brass Era car
- List of motorized trikes
- Safety bicycle
- Steam locomotive
- Tricycle
- Unicycle
- Wagon
- Velomobile, an enclosed human-powered vehicle
- List of land vehicles types by number of wheels
