= Qooder =

Swiss motorcycle and scooter manufacturer

Qooder SA
- Formerly: Quadro Vehicles
- Industry: Automotive
- Founded: 2010
- Headquarters: Vacallo, Switzerland
- Areas served: Europe, United States
- Key people: Paolo Gagliardo, CEO
- Products: Motorized three and four wheeled vehicles, scooters
- Brands: Qooder, QV3, Oxygen, Nuvion
- Subsidiaries: Qooder USA
- Website: Qooder

Qooder SA (formerly Quadro Vehicles) is a Swiss manufacturer of street-legal vehicles. Its flagship product is the Qooder, a four-wheeled tilting street vehicle. Its other products include a three-wheeled tilting vehicle similar to the Qooder, as well as electric scooters. It operates in the United States under the subsidiary name Qooder USA.

== History ==
Qooder was founded as Quadro Vehicles in 2010 and is headquartered in Vacallo, Switzerland. It released its first three-wheeled vehicle in 2011 and its first four-wheeled vehicle in 2015. It was rebranded from Quadro Vehicles to Qooder, and in 2019 it entered the US-market with its Qooder brand under the subsidiary Qooder USA.

== Vehicles ==
=== Qooder ===
The Qooder is a model of street-legal motorized quadricycles and is the flagship of Qooder SA. It is a four-wheeled scooter and has double rear-wheel drive with mechanical differential and 4-wheel integral braking. It has a hydro-pneumatic suspension, known as "Hydraulic Tilting System," or "HTS," which allows a rider to tilt all of the wheels simultaneously for motorcycle-like riding dynamics. In 2020 it incorporated an electronic version of the HTS, known as E-HTS, which locks the tilting while the vehicle is stopped or parked to allow riders to keep their feet up while stopped.

The Qooder is gasoline operated and also available in an electric version which utilizes the Zero Motorcycles electric drive system. The Qooder is a street-legal vehicle that also has an off-road enduro version called the XQooder.

=== X Qooder ===
Adventure motorcycle version of Qooder, with crash bars and all-terrain tyres.

=== QV3 ===
The QV3 is a motorized tricycle similar to a motorcycle, only with two wheels in the front and one wheel in the rear. It also uses the Hydraulic Tilting System and is available in an electric version which was released in 2020.

=== Oxygen and Nuvion ===
Oxygen is a zero-emissions brand of electric scooter. Born as a division of Atala and later acquired by Quadro, currently sold two-wheeled electric vehicle designed for travel in urban locations and where motor vehicles are restricted. The Nuvion is a lightweight, gas-powered, three-wheel leaning vehicle similar to the QV3.
