= Uno (dicycle) =

Self-balancing electric motorcycle

Inventor Ben Gulak riding the Uno cycle

The Uno is a novel self-balancing electric motorcycle using two wheels side by side (the configuration used by dicycles). The Uno III adds a third wheel that allows it to transform into a tricycle.

== Operation ==
The original Uno is controlled in forward motion by the rider shifting weight over the centre of gravity. When the rider shifts forward, the vehicle speeds up to regain balance, when the rider leans back, the vehicle slows. Steering is controlled by side-to-side motion of the rider. The vehicle senses this shift and raises one of the two wheels to allow the vehicle to tilt in the desired turn direction.

The Uno III has two configurations, as a dicycle and as a tricycle. As a dicycle it operates much the same as the original Uno with forward and back motion of the rider affecting acceleration. The Uno III also utilizes a hand throttle to affect acceleration and braking. Instead of using rider side-to-side movement to control steering, the Uno III uses a rotating handlebar.

== History ==
The Uno was conceived by Milton, Ontario teenager Ben Gulak in 2006, following a trip to China. After seeing major smog pollution caused by heavy use of small motor vehicles, he decided he wanted to create an eco-friendly alternative. His initial design efforts consisted of an angle-iron frame with wheelchair motors, batteries and gyroscopes. He described his very first test-ride as "absolutely terrifying" and resulted in a crash and a chipped kneecap. Other early problems, including a series of electrical fires, arose, and he was then joined by California robotics expert Trevor Blackwell, who had previously designed a eunicycle, a single-wheeled gyro-stabilized vehicle, as well as a two-wheeler that resembled a Segway PT, to iron out the initial problems. Blackwell and Gulak refined the Uno's gyro control system so the machine would properly balance and move smoothly. Gulak then used the revised plans to develop a prototype vehicle with the help of engineer Werner Poss, Veltronics Ltd. of Brampton, Ontario, John Cosentini of Motorcycle Enhancements, a custom motorcycle builder in Oakville, Ontario, and research partner Jason Morrow.

The Uno was unveiled at the Toronto Spring Motorcycle Show in 2008, and won a Top-10 prize on Popular Science's list of 2008 Invention Awards. On the CBC series Dragons' Den, Gulak was given $1,250,000 in venture capital for a 20% share in further development. The deal fell apart in due diligence and only W. Brett Wilson paid his $250,000 portion.

According to Ben Gulak, in order to improve the safety and usability of the Uno his company BPG Inc developed the Uno III to be able to transform from the classic Uno dicycle into a motorcycle. Though not a motorcycle in the classic definition, the 'motorcycle mode' is actually a tricycle with the two rear wheels coming so close together that they resemble a single wide wheel. The Uno III transforms between these two modes while being ridden.

== See also ==
- List of motorized trikes
- EUC
