= Skirider =

A Skirider is a kind of scooter designed to work on snow in 2002 by 2004 British inventor of the year Andrew Hubert von Staufer winning Platinum for design and Gold leisure. It was invented to make the slopes more accessible to people whose physical limitations prevented them from skiing but ironically it soon caught on with extreme sports enthusiasts. It won Silver prize at Salon Des Inventions in Geneva in 2005 and is increasing in popularity. It won its first slope approvals in Whistler B.C. in early December 2005 and quickly became approved for popular ski resort slopes around the world meeting health and safety standards for the following slopes:

Austria
Mayrhofen, St Christoph, St Stefan

Canada
Cypress Mountain, Fernie Alpine Resort, Red Mountain Resort, Sun Peaks, Whistler-Blackcomb

France
Saisies, Les Menuires, Morillon, Val-d'Isère

Greenland
Nuuk,

Italy
Bolzano, Val Gardena

Serbia
Kapaonik

Slovenia
Krvavec, Soriska Planina, Vogel

Switzerland
Davos

United Kingdom
Milton Keynes (indoor), Pontypool (artificial), Tamworth (indoor)

USA
Aspen, Mount Lemmon, Winter Park

In 2006 it came in second place on Sky 1's The Big Idea.
