= Monowheel =

One-wheeled vehicle

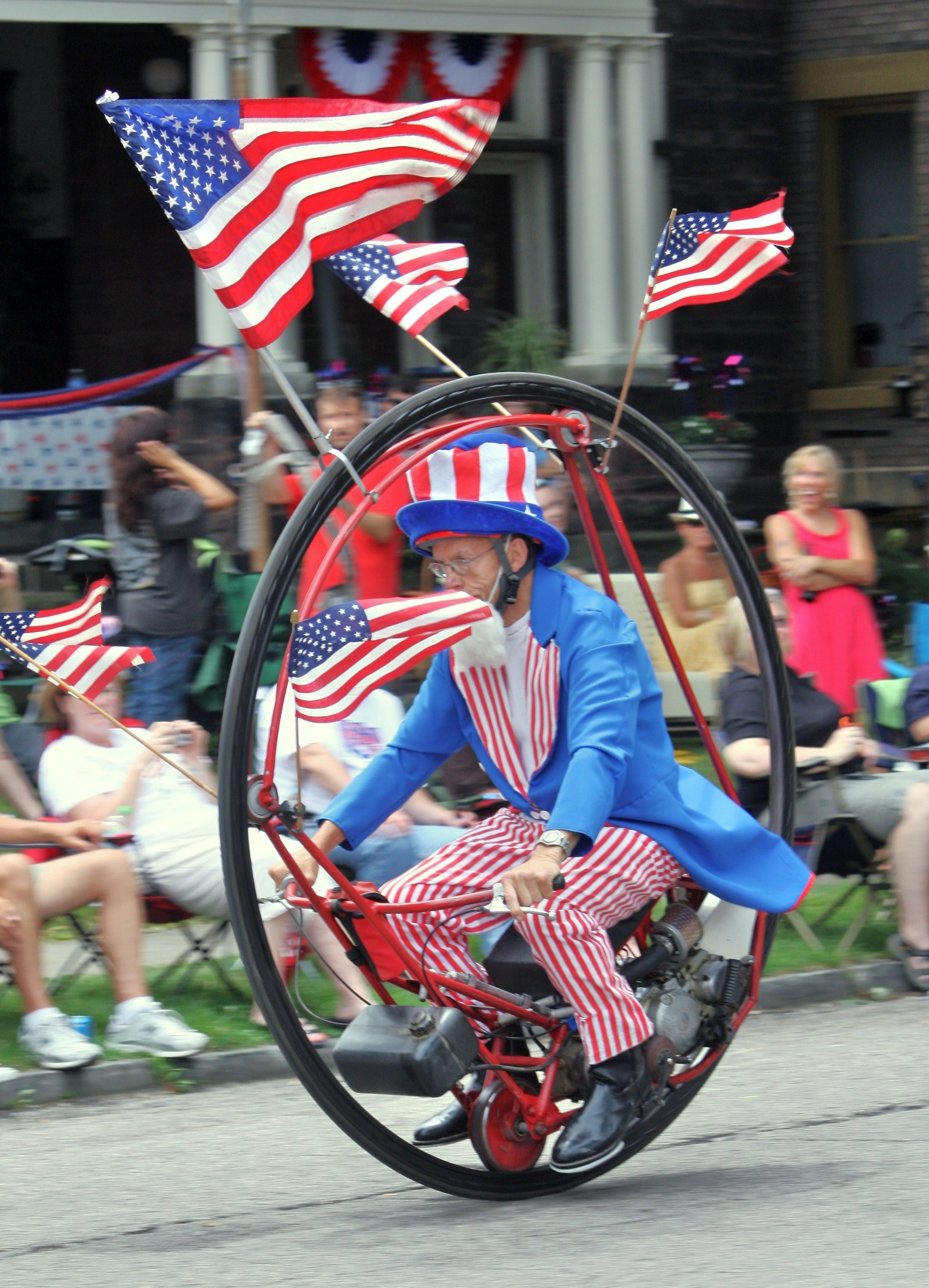
A monowheel rider in the 2011 Doo Dah Parade, Columbus, Ohio

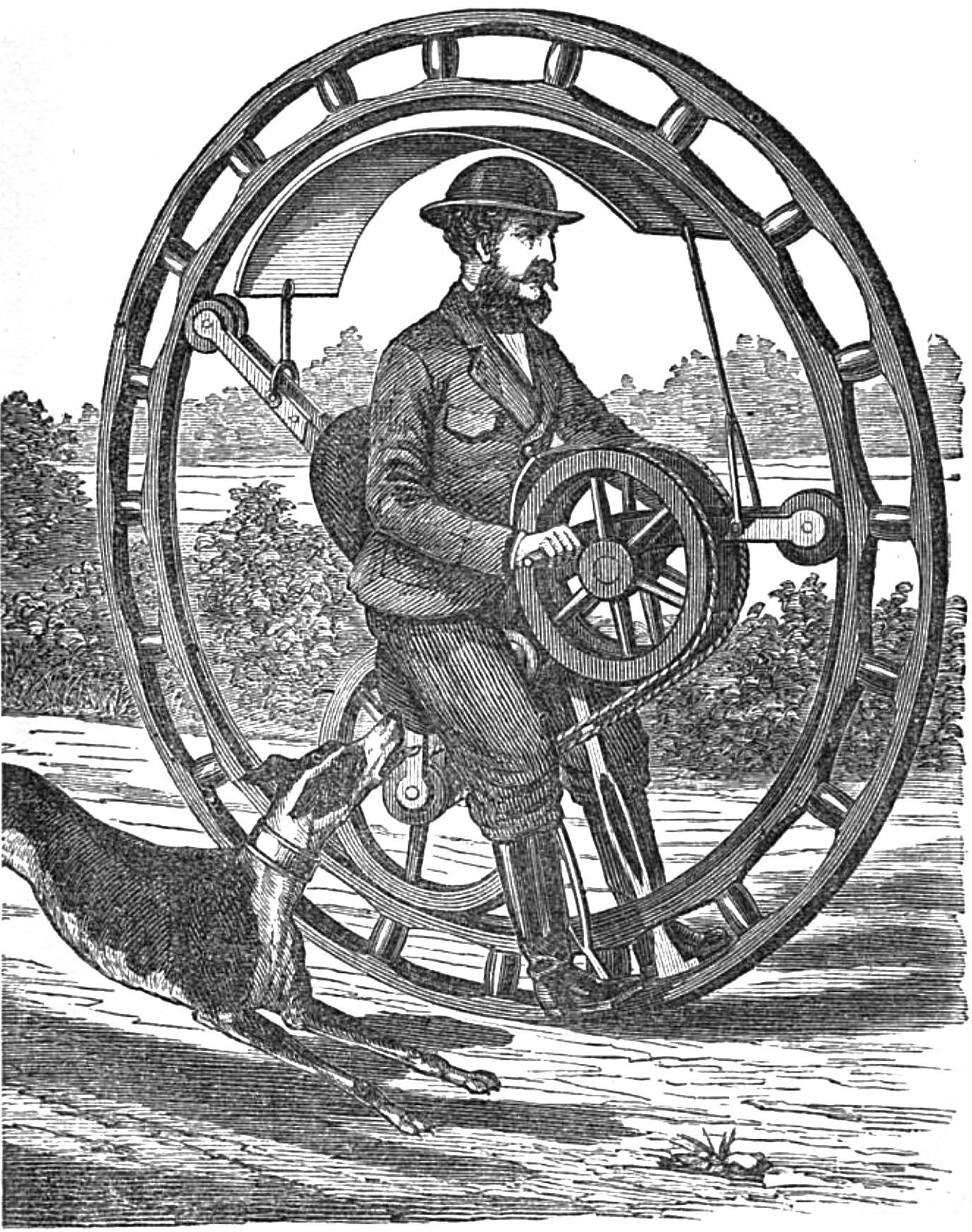
Hemmings' Unicycle, or "Flying Yankee Velocipede", was a hand-powered monowheel patented in 1869 by Richard C. Hemmings.

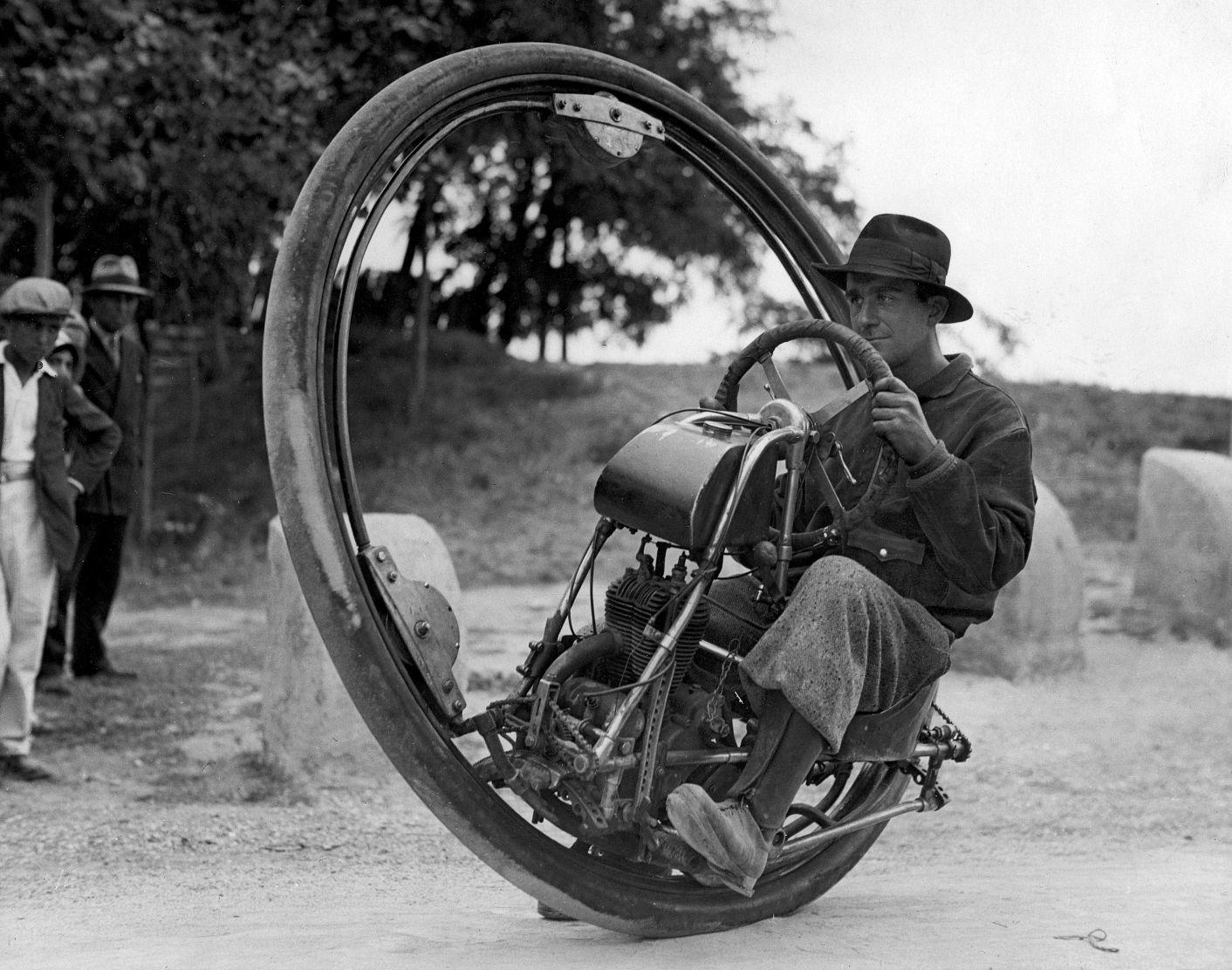
1931 Cislaghi Motoruota monowheel, modified by Giuseppe Govetosa

A monowheel or uniwheel is a type of one-wheeled, single-track vehicle. Unlike the unicycle, a monowheel consists of a large, hollow wheel that loops above and around the driver. Monowheels are typically powered by an engine as with a motorcycle, with a chassis securing the steering, driver's seat, and propulsion mechanism to the interior of the wheel.

Hand-cranked and pedal-powered monowheels were patented and built in the late 19th century; most built in the 20th and 21st century have been motorized. Some modern builders refer to these vehicles as monocycles, though that term is also sometimes used to describe motorized unicycles.

A world speed record for a motorized monowheel was set in 2016, at 98.464 km/h (61.18 mph).

== Stability ==
Similar to bicycles, monowheels are stable in the direction of travel, but have limited horizontal stability. This is in contrast to unicycles which are unstable in both directions. Monowheels have also been found to have a lower speed required for stability when compared to unicycles.

A monowheel remains upright due to gyroscopic effects, but its lack of stability makes it highly dependent on forward momentum and the balance of the rider, who must maintain stability while steering. Over the history of the monowheel, various stability enhancements have been tried such as support struts (Green & Dyer, 1869), skids and propellers (D'Harlingue Propeller-Driven Monowheel, 1914), as well as gyroscopes, fins, and rudders (The McLean V8 Monowheel, 2003). Many riders choose to control stability when at a stop by putting their feet on the ground, similar to bicycles and motorcycles.

== Variants and related vehicles ==
There have been many proposals for variants or uses, such as a horse-drawn monowheel or a monowheel tank.

An electric monowheel called Dynasphere was tested in 1932 in the United Kingdom.

In 1971, an American inventor named Kerry McLean built his first monocycle (a.k.a. monowheel). In 2000, he built a larger version, the McLean Rocket Roadster powered by a Buick V-8 engine, which subsequently crashed in 2001 during the initial test run. McLean survived and proceeded to build over 25 different variations of his version of the monocycle, from pedal-powered models, 5 HP models, all the way up to V8-powered models. In 2010, Nokia used two of McLean's monocycles in their commercials promoting the new Nokia SatNav smartphone. Some of his models were available made-to-order.

One variant called a RIOT wheel was presented at Burning Man in 2003. It involves the passengers sitting in front of the wheel and being balanced by a heavy counterweight inside the wheel. Rather than the typical ring drive, this vehicle is powered through a sprocket attached to the spokes.

Brazilian company Wheelsurf Sport Ltda released for sale a model named Wheelsurf in 2005 via its Brazilian headquarters and subsidiary in Netherlands.

Chinese Monocycle was a commercial pedal-powered monowheel built in China available for sale at the latest in 2000.

Pedal-powered ones are usually used in performance arts; notable examples include Monovelo, which was made commercially available, at the closing ceremony of the 2008 Beijing Olympics.

Rodafonio is an art installation made in 2010 for La Mercè used by music group Factoria Circular that combines the concepts of monowheel and Silly-Cycle and modifies it to accommodate three musicians playing instruments while driving around.

A related vehicle is the diwheel or the dicycle, in which the rider is suspended between or inside of a pair of large wheels placed side by side.

== See also ==
- Bicycle – Pedal-driven two-wheel vehicle
- Centreless wheel – Type of wheel without a hub
- Onewheel – Self-balancing electric skateboard
- Electric unicycle – Self-balancing single wheel personal transporter
- Tricycle – Three-wheeled self-powered vehicle
- Star Wars wheelbike
