= Motorized tricycle =

Resembling a bicycle with two rear wheels and an engine

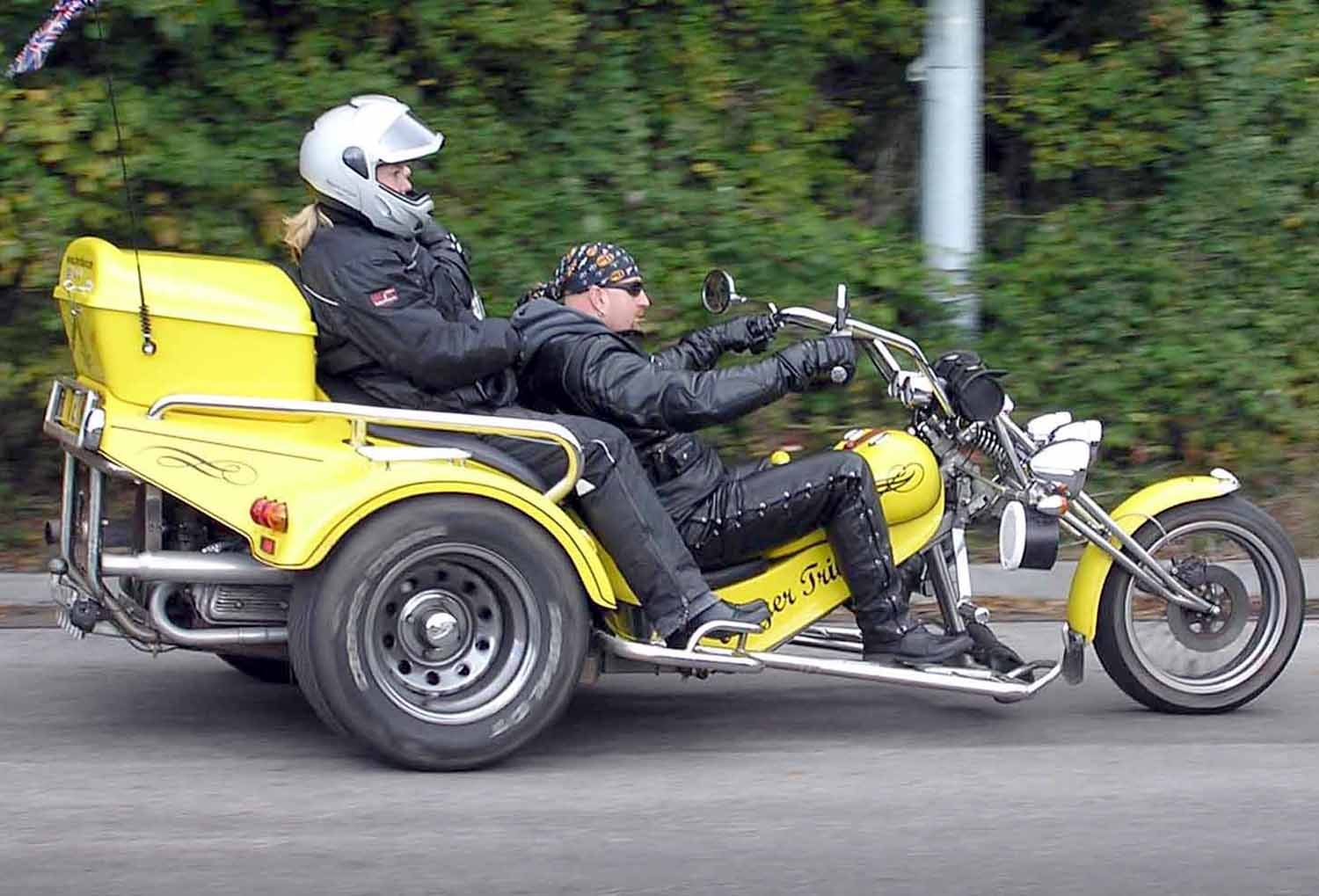
Motorized trike in Bristol, England

The Mego 250S 3-wheeler was originally introduced in 1962 and produced, with upgrades (with or without cab), for 25 years

A motorized tricycle, motor trike, or motortrycle is a three-wheeled vehicle based on the same technology as a motorcycle, and powered by an electric motor, motorcycle, scooter or car engine.

== Classification ==
Depending on the design of the vehicle, a motorized trike may be categorized as a motorcycle, motor scooter, or simply the three-wheeled counterpart to a motorized or electric bicycle. The main difference between a motorcycle trike and a scooter trike is that motorcycles are sat on in a "saddle"-style seating (as with a horse), with the legs apart, and motorcycles have manual transmissions. Scooters have a "step-through" seating style, in which the driver sits on a more chair-like seat, with the legs together; as well, scooters have automatic transmissions. Laypersons often associate the engine size as a dividing line between motorcycles and scooters, since a typical scooter has a small 50 cc engine, but scooter engines can also be as large as 650cc as used in the Suzuki Burgman.

Motorcycles with sidecars are not usually considered tricycles. It can be harder to categorize three-wheeled automobiles. While some early prototype automobiles were steam tricycles, three-wheeled cars such as the Morgan 3-Wheeler are often classified as cars rather than motorcycles. Generally, the motorcycle classification will require passengers to sit behind the driver, whereas in the car classification, at least one passenger is able to sit abreast to the driver.

== Historical Origins ==
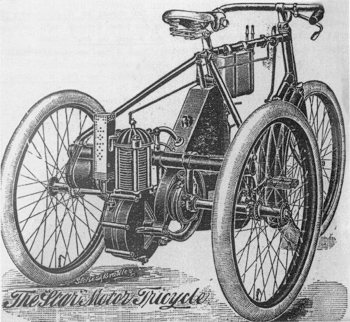
Star tricycle 1899

The motorized tricycle had quite a boom period at the end of the 19th century. Early engines weren't as compact or lightweight as modern ones, and clutches, and electric ignition were still new ideas being incorporated. Given this, the tricycle offered a better platform to add an engine to than a bicycle. The addition of engines to tricycles was covered in a motor supplement to Cycling magazine in 1899, from which the following are taken:

- De Dion Bouton motor tricycle, France - 2.25 HP De Dion Bouton engine, electric ignition.
- Humber 'Beeston' motor tricycle, Beeston, UK - De Dion Bouton engine of 1.75 or 2.25 HP. Electric ignition. £84
- Beeston Motor Company Ltd, Beeston, UK - 2HP engine with electric ignition, Priced £70
- Pennington motor tricycle, London - 2.5HP - Had a clutch, so you can stop while the engine is still running (others you had to pedal to restart)
- Clement motor tricycle, France - 2.25HP De Dion Bouton or Aster engines
- Riley motor tricycle, Coventry, UK - Novel use of freewheel at the engine end of the chain, instead of at the pedals, so that when freewheeling the chain isn't moving.
- The Edie motor tricycle, Redditch, UK - De Dion Bouton engine of 1.75 or 2.25 HP. Electric ignition.
- Empress motor tricycle, France - De Dion Bouton 2.25HP engine electric ignition
- Star motor tricycle, Wolverhampton, UK - De Dion Bouton with hot tube ignition (electric ignition a £10 optional extra)
- The Bard motor tricycle, Birmingham, UK - De Dion Bouton 2.25HP engine with electric ignition
- The Phebus-Aster motor tricycle, France - Aster engine of 2.25HP with electric ignition

Beeston Humber 1898 400cc motorised tricycle at the National Motorcycle Museum, UK

There were many more makes, and then variations with tandem seating to allow a passenger. Prices were typically £70 to £85, so they were not budget transport - though a lot cheaper than the early cars. Most had no gears and no clutch (the Pennington being the exception), so you had to pedal to start them. Other makers had twin wheels at the front and a single at the back, allowing a passenger to be carried in comfort right at the front - away from the noise and smoke of the engine, but vulnerable in the event of a collision.

== Motorcycle tricycles ==
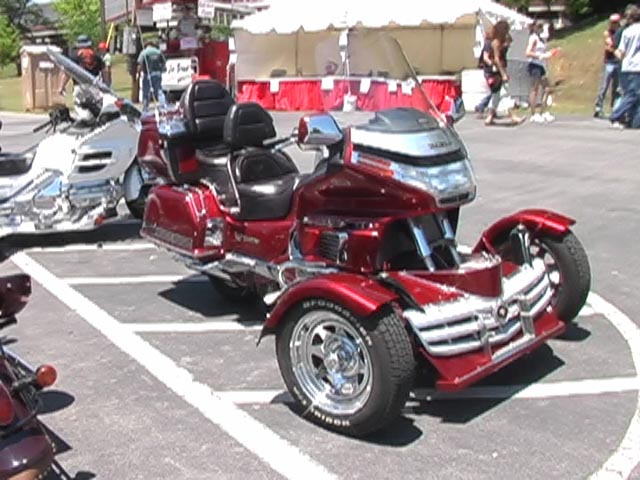
Reverse trike

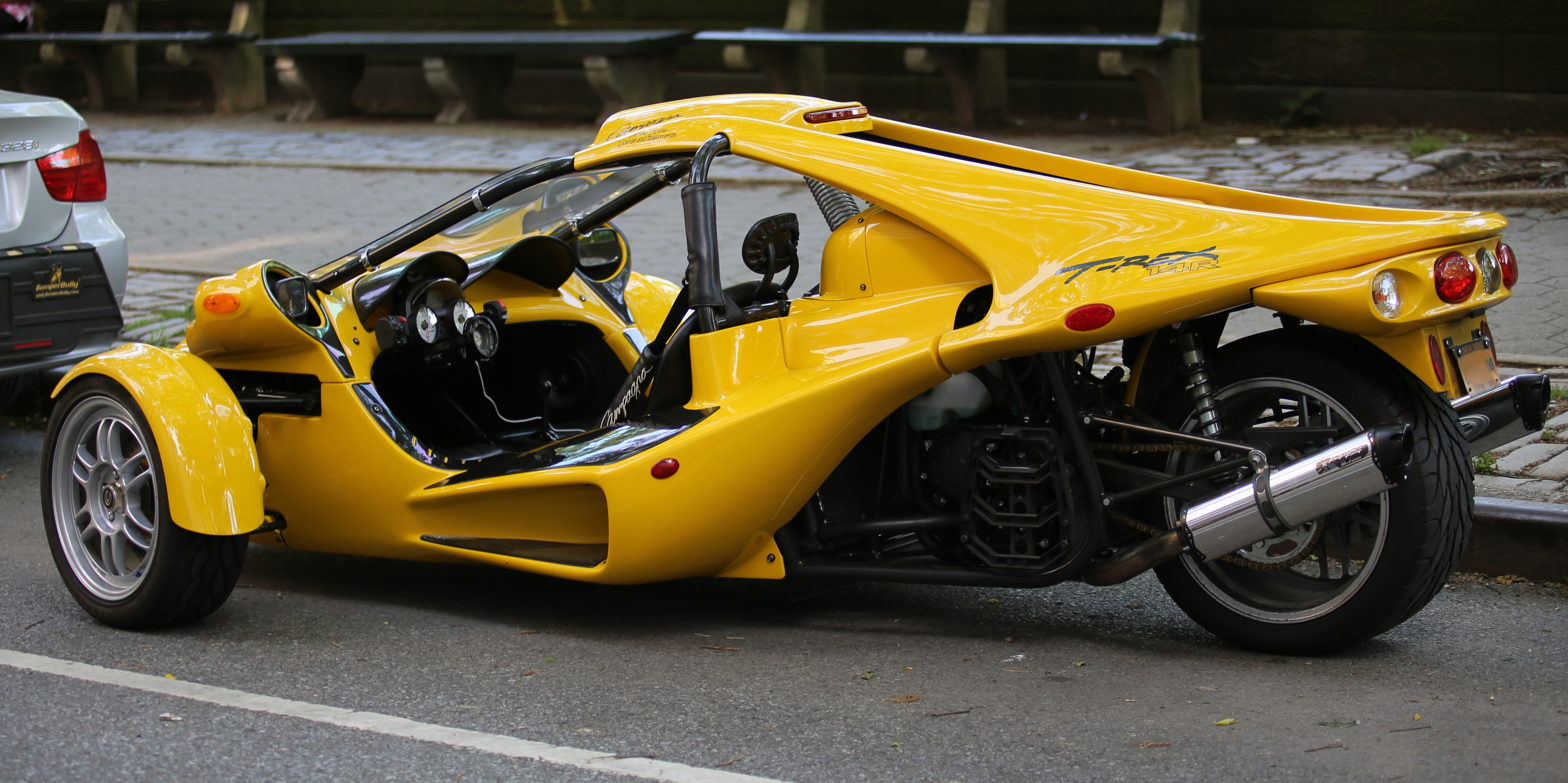
A Campagna T-Rex motorized reverse trike

A motorized tricycle's wheels may be arranged in either configuration: delta or reverse (tadpole). A delta trike has one wheel in front and two in back, and the reverse or tadpole trike has two wheels in front and one in back. Occasionally, rear wheel steering is used, although this increases the turning circle and can affect handling (the geometry is similar to a regular trike operating in reverse, but with a steering damper added).

Tadpoles are more stable under braking and more likely to slide instead of roll; front braking hard on a delta requires the vehicle to steer almost straight to avoid tipping. The balance of friction patches and rolling resistance also means that tadpoles tend to oversteer and deltas understeer.

Motor trikes are attractive for those with mobility or balance problems.

Under some local regulations, while riding a three-wheeled vehicle, it may be possible to carry multiple passengers with a motorcycle driving license, to ride a motorcycle-style vehicle with a car license, or to avoid motorcycle helmet use regulations.

These machines are generally custom-built. A common arrangement is to fit chopper-style ("ape hanger") front forks to a VW Beetle engine and transaxle, popular because it is largely self-contained on a single subframe. Similarly, the engine, transmission and rear wheel may be taken from a large motorcycle as a single unit, and used in the construction of a tadpole trike.

Mass-manufactured motor tricycles include the Piaggio MP3; the Piaggio Ape (Italian for Bee) delivery trike (delta); the Harley-Davidson Tri Glide Ultra Classic; the BRP Can-Am Spyder (tadpole); the Polaris Slingshot (tadpole); the Campagna T-Rex reverse trike; trikes used by municipal authorities in the USA; and, historically, vehicles such as the Scammell Scarab railway dray, a common sight around post-war British railway stations.

== Motorized freight trikes ==
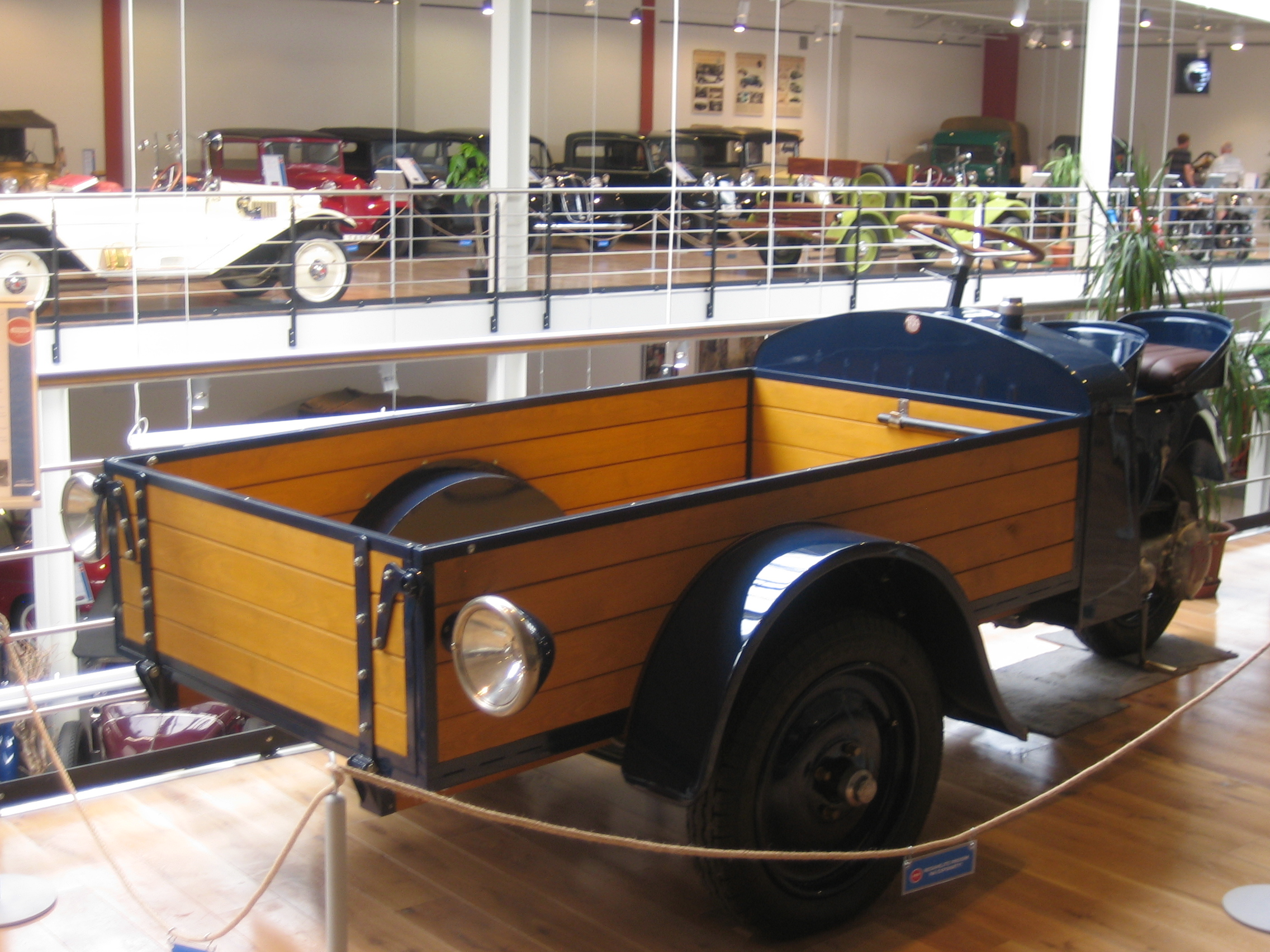
Tatra 49 freight motor tricycle

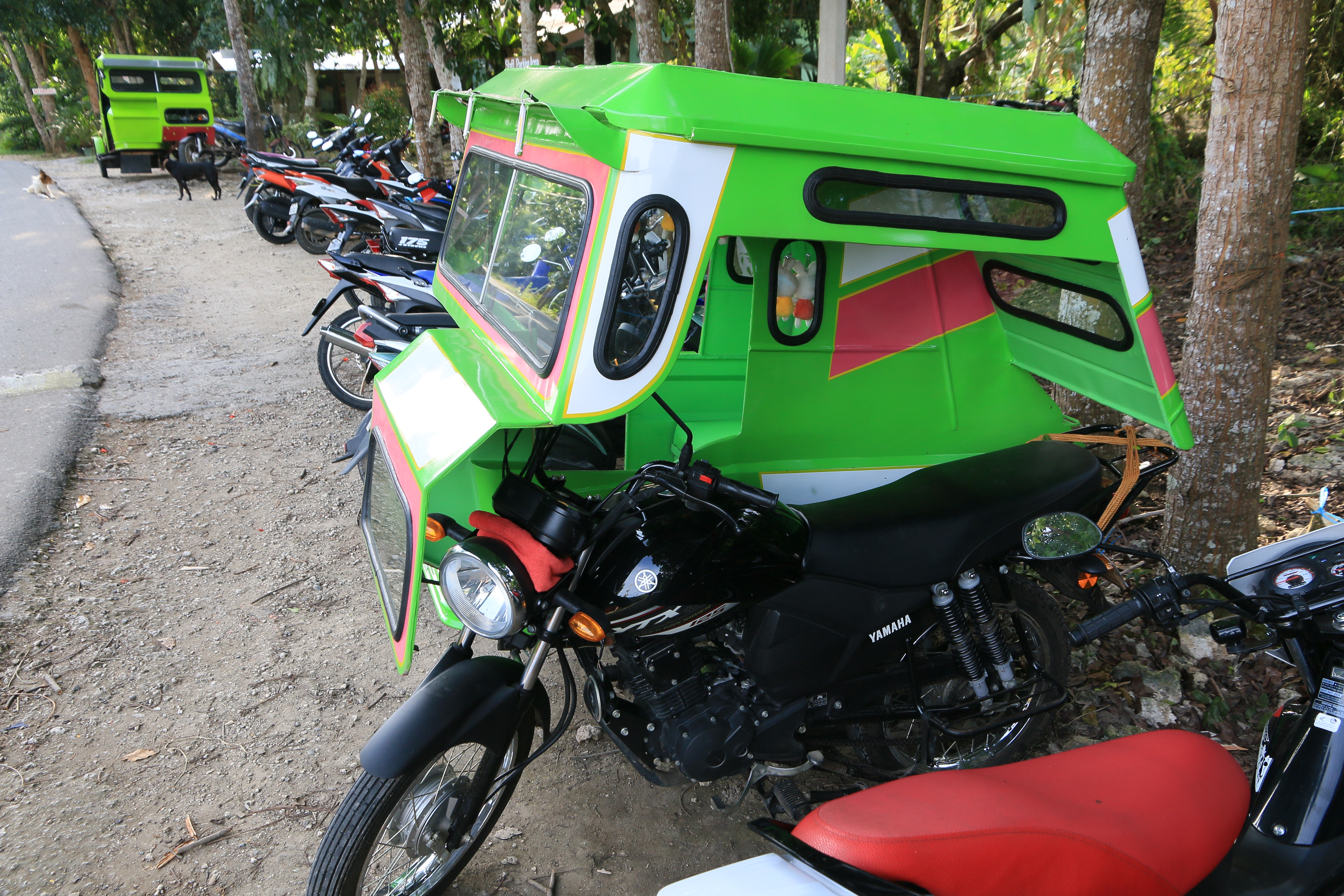
The Philippine tricycle, one of the most common forms of public transportation in the country. It is a sidecar, not a tuk-tuk

In Asian and Southeast Asian countries, motorized trikes are used as small freight trucks and commercial vehicles. Nicknamed "three-wheelers" or "tuk-tuks" in popular parlance, they are a motorized version of the traditional pulled rickshaw or cycle rickshaw. While they are mostly used as taxis for hire, they are also used for commercial and freight deliveries. They are particularly popular in cities where traffic congestion is a problem.

They usually have a sheet-metal body or open frame that rests on three wheels, a canvas roof with drop-down sides, a small cabin in the front of the vehicle for the driver, an air-cooled scooter version of a two-stroke engine, with handlebar controls instead of a steering wheel. The smaller motorized trikes are used as delivery vehicles for lighter loads. The larger trikes, with more powerful engines, have larger cargo bays, and they can carry freight within a city.

=== China ===
Motorized three-wheel freight vehicles are a common sight throughout China. They come in various sizes, from open saddle-style trikes to "three-wheel trucks" with a fully closed cabin.

=== Philippines ===
In the Philippines, the term "tricycle" often refers to a motorcycle with a passenger cab (either to one side or centered). These tricycles are commonly used as a public utility vehicle and for personal transportation.

=== India ===
Since 2012, electric tricycles known as e-rickshaws have become popular, replacing other commercial transports. For vehicles other than electric rickshaws, various locally made configurations are used in India. They fall under the category of Jugaad and serve as both passenger and commercial vehicles. The motorized versions are popular for their low cost, because they are put together from salvaged motorcycles and often do not require the operator to have a driver's license.

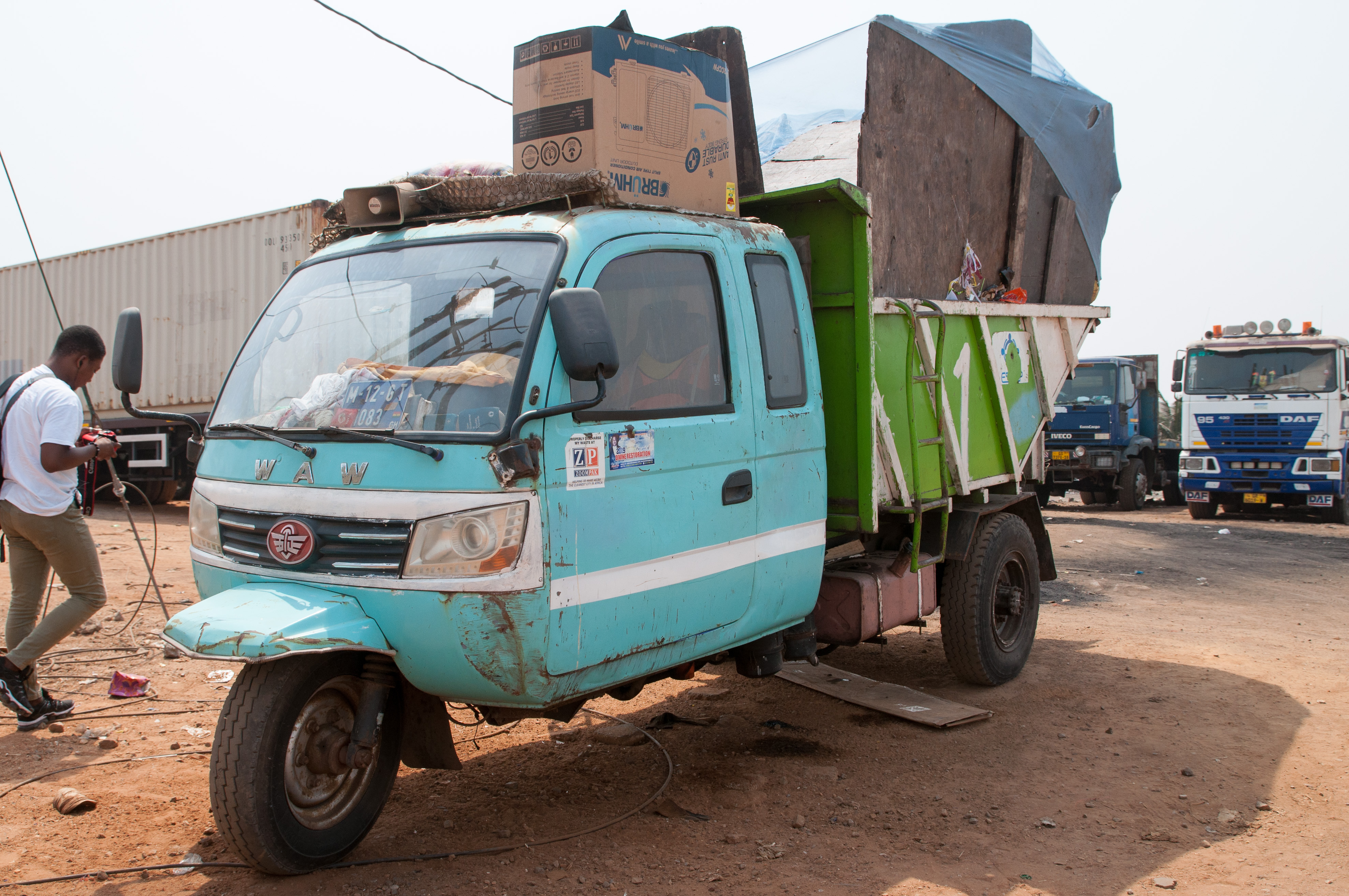
Motorized tricycle for collecting rubbish in Ghana

== See also ==
- List of motorized trikes (motorized tricycles)
- Types of motorcycles
- Qooder Motorized quadcycle
