= Dicycle =

Vehicle with two parallel wheels

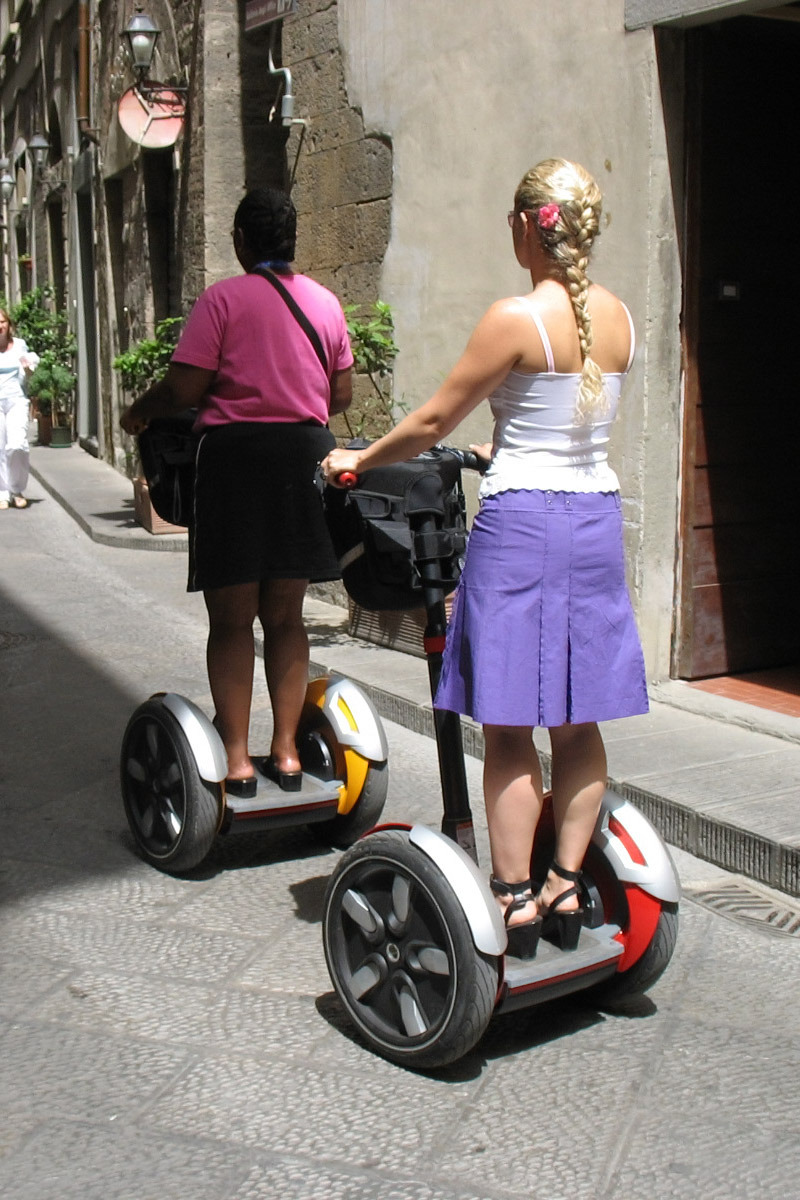
Two tourists on a Segway tour in Florence, Italy

A dicycle (/ˈdaɪsɪkəl/) (also known as a diwheel) is a vehicle with two parallel wheels, side by side, unlike single-track vehicles such as motorcycles and bicycles, which have two wheels inline. Originally used to refer to devices with large wheels and pedals, the term is now used in relation to powered self-balancing scooters with smaller wheels and no pedals such as the Segway PT and the self-balancing hoverboard.

== Etymology ==
In more recent usage, "dicycle" has been used for both pedaled and motorised vehicles with wheels of varying sizes, as long as they share a common axis, though not necessarily a common axle. In 2017, the Merriam-Webster's dictionary, limited usage to 'velocipedes with two parallel wheels,' and the Oxford English Dictionary limited it to 'pedal-powered vehicles with large wheels placed parallel to each other'.

== Examples ==
=== Otto Bicycle ===
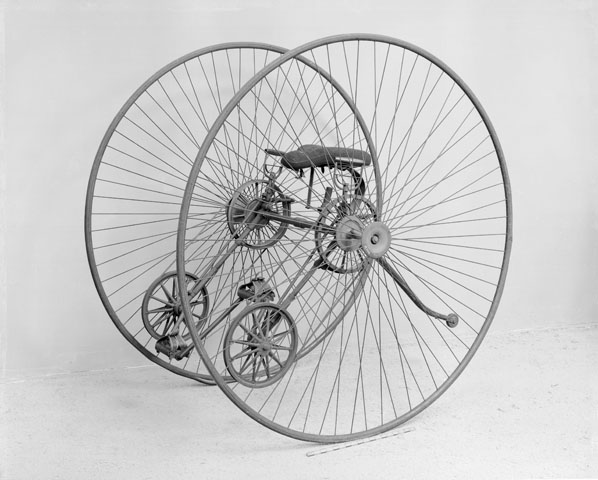
Otto Bicycle c.1880

In 1877 German-British Edward Otto patented his "Otto Bicycle" as a safer alternative to the large-wheeled penny-farthing bicycle. In 1879 he received French patent No. 133032 which includes patent drawings. As built between 1879 and 1881, it had two 56" wheels set 32" apart on stub axles connected by a frame with a seat or saddle between. Below the rider are two cranked pedals which turn pulleys at each end of the crankshaft. Running over these are steel bands to pulleys fixed to each wheel on the stub axles. The crankshaft and stub axles are held apart by two sprung poles and there are handles on the stub axles. When a handle is lifted, it increases the distance between the pulleys, acting as a band brake. Lifting the handle on one side applies the brake to one wheel, causing the vehicle to turn; lifting the handles on both sides slows it. If the vehicle tips forward (as when learning to ride), the rider naturally stops further tipping by stepping forward out of the vehicle and standing up. The vehicle is stopped from tipping back too far by a stay at the back with a caster.

=== Segway PT ===
The Segway PT is a two-wheeled self-balancing personal transporter which uses computers, sensors, and electric motors to keep the device upright. The rider commands the PT to go forward or backward by shifting their weight forward or backward on the platform. The maximum speed of the Segway PT is 12.5 miles per hour (20.1 km/h) with a range of 24 mi (39 km) on a fully charged lithium-ion battery, depending on terrain, riding style, and the condition of the batteries. Invented by Dean Kamen, it is produced by Segway Inc.

=== Self-balancing scooter ===
The self-balancing scooter is a category of personal transporter which includes all self-balancing powered portable devices with two parallel wheels that includes the Segway PT, the Segway miniPRO and the self-balancing hoverboard.

=== Diwheel design ===
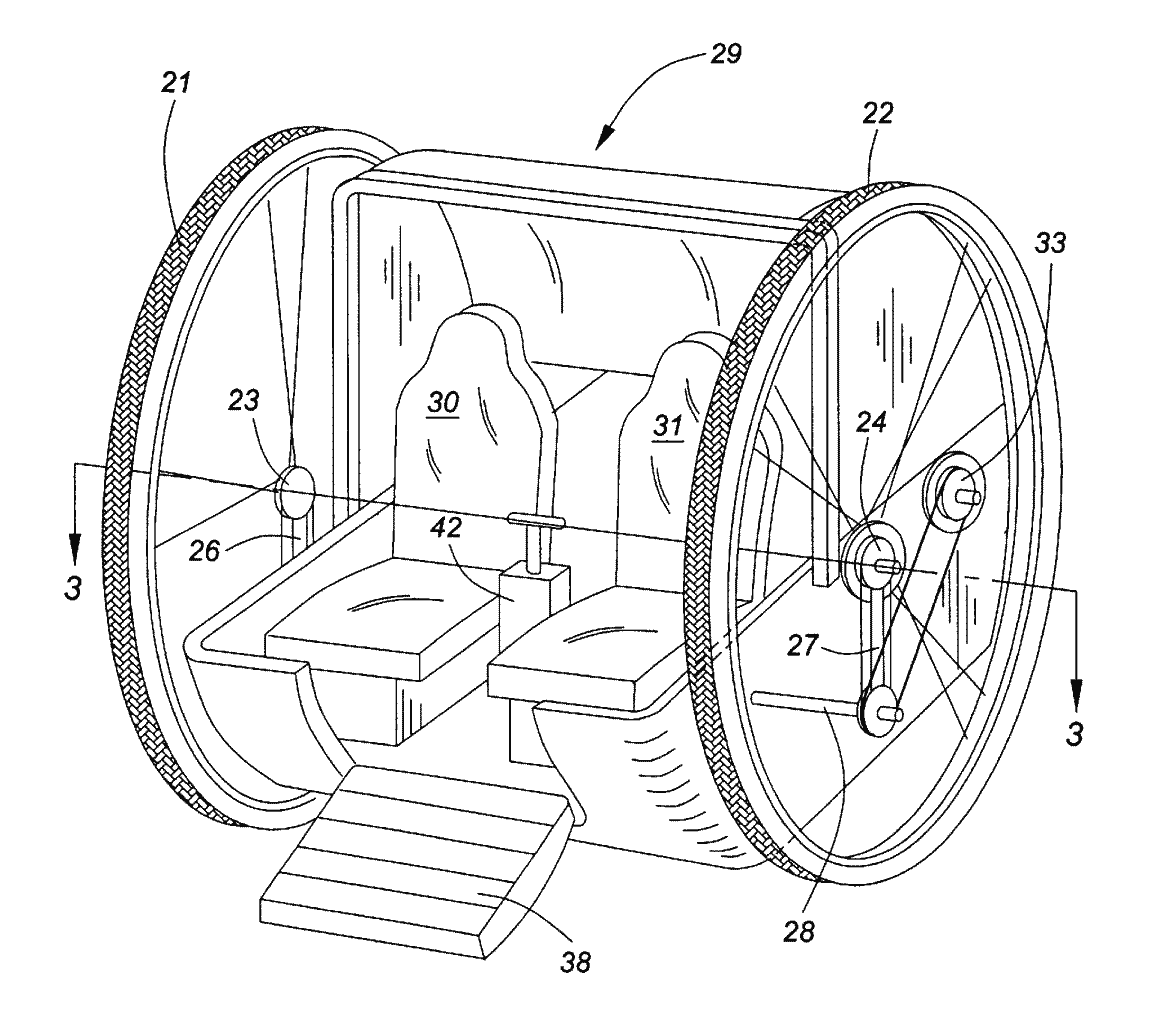
Drawing from 2002 patent application

The diwheel design has the two large outer wheels completely encompassing an inner frame. The inner frame is free to rotate within the wheels, and is typically supported by a common axle or idlers which roll on the wheels (see figure). Diwheels, like their more popular cousins the monowheel, have been around for almost one and a half centuries. All of these platforms suffer from two common issues affecting driver comfort; slosh and tumbling (also known as gerbilling). Sloshing is when the inner frame oscillates, and it occurs in all monowheels and diwheels where the centre of gravity of the inner frame is offset from the centre line of the wheels. It is very prevalent as these platforms typically have low damping between the wheel and the frame, to minimise power consumption during locomotion. In addition, during severe braking or acceleration the inner frame will tumble relative to the earth centred frame, which affects the ability of the driver to control the platform. Both the sloshing and tumbling issue can be controlled through feedback control, and has been demonstrated successfully. The equations of motion for the diwheel have been published.

== Gallery ==
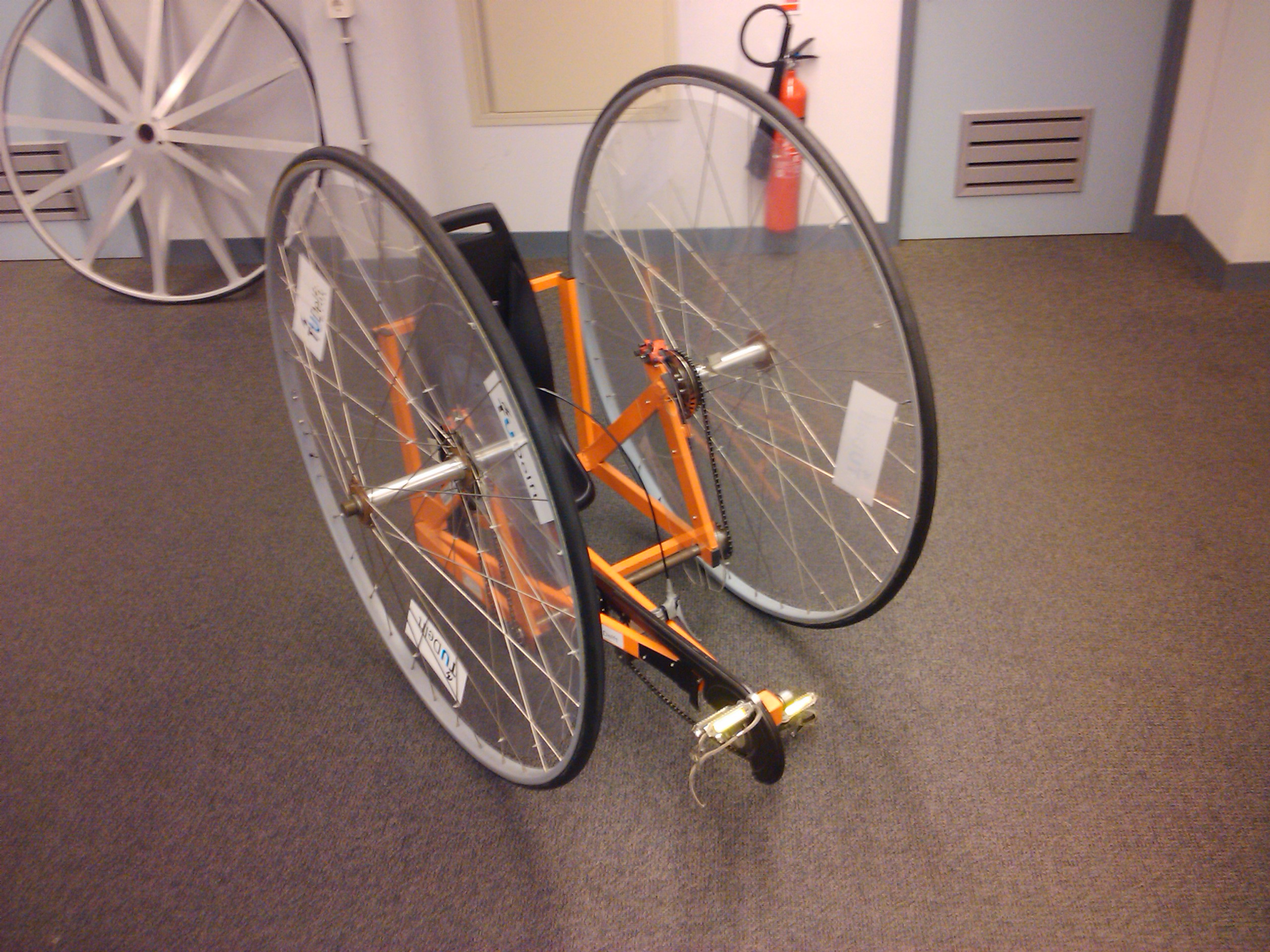
Dicycle at Delft University of Technology (photo 2011)

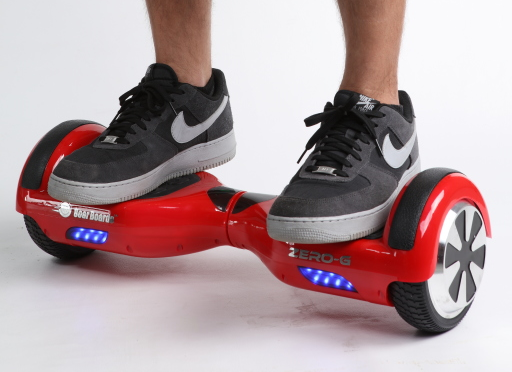

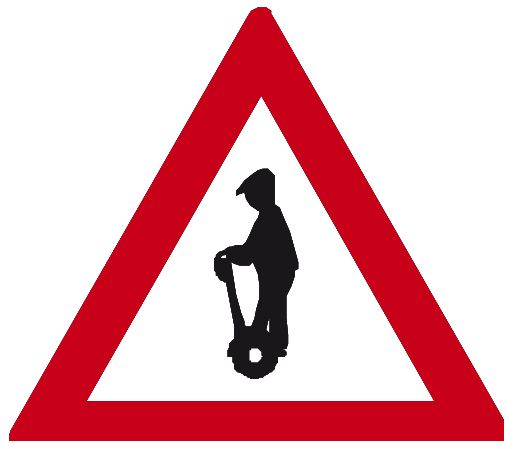
Persons on personal transporters - road sign in Czechia

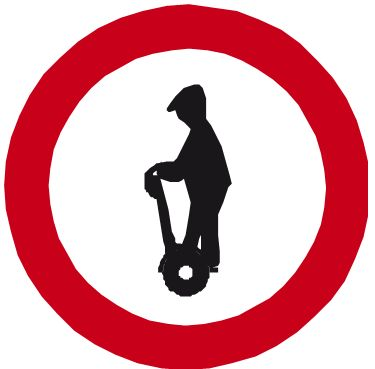
No entry to persons on personal transporters - road sign in Czechia

== See also ==
- List of land vehicles types by number of wheels
- Cart – Wheeled conveyance for loads
- Uno (dicycle) – Self-balancing electric motorcycle
