= Road signs in Slovakia =

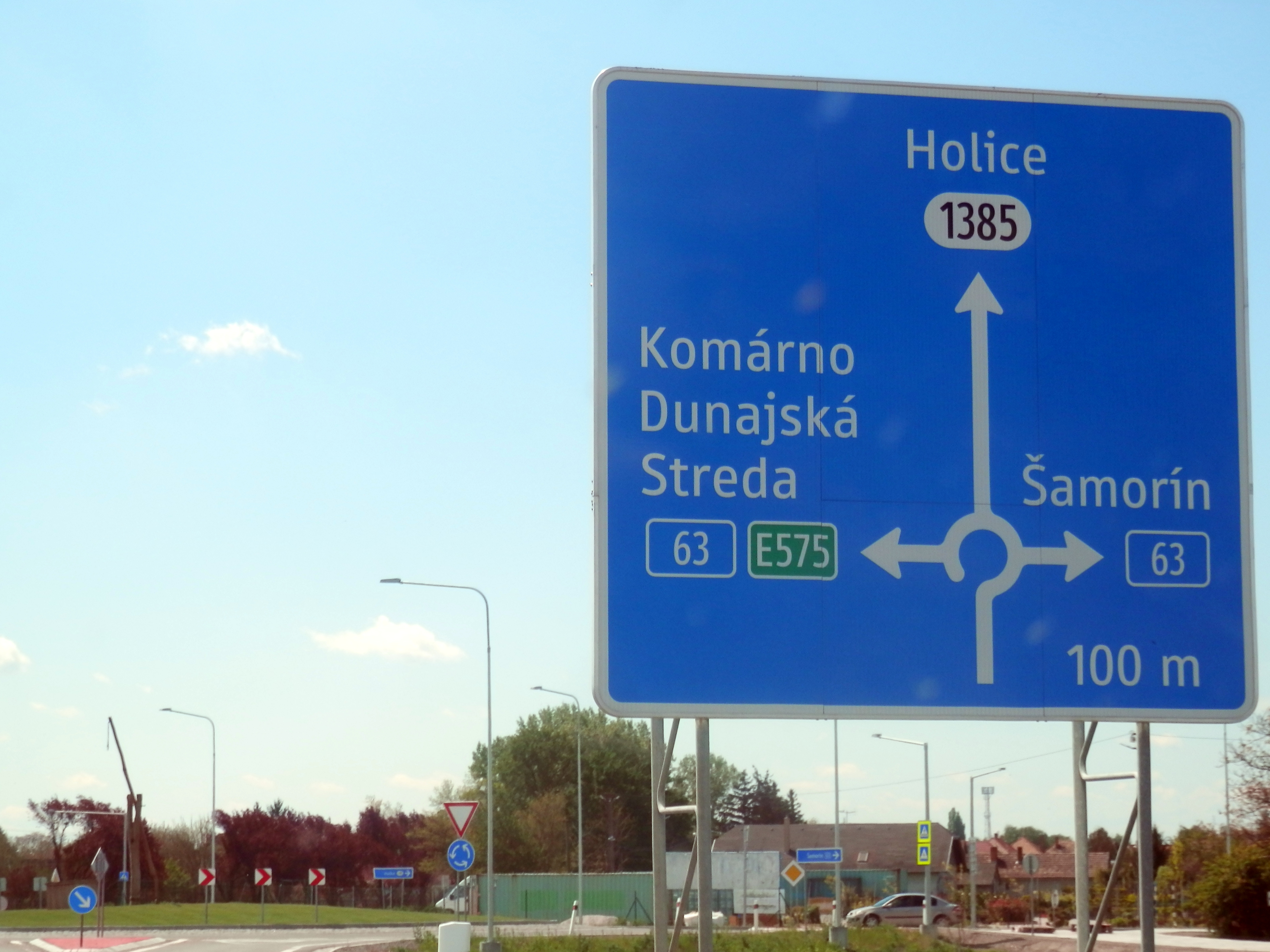
Roundabout sign located near Dunajská Streda

Road signs in Slovakia are regulated by the Ministry of Transport and the Ministry of Interior.

Road signs in Slovakia began developing in the early 20th century, influenced by Austro-Hungarian standards. After becoming part of Czechoslovakia in 1918, the country adopted a unified system of road signs. In the 1950s-60s, signs were updated to match international standards from the Vienna Convention on Road Signs and Signals, which Czechoslovakia signed. After Slovakia became independent in 1993, it kept most of the Czechoslovak traffic sign system, while in the process modernizing it.

The signs were updated in April 2020, modernising existing signs as well as adding some new ones, such as small white arrows on the No stopping or parking sign. Slovakia use the Tern typeface on their newest signs, which were updated in 2020.

== Warning signs ==
101 - Other danger

110-10 - Left curve

110-20 - Right curve

112 - Steep descent

113 - Steep ascent

114-10 - Road narrows (right side)

114-20 - Road narrows (left side)

114-30 - Road narrows (both sides)

115 - Uneven road

116 - Soft shoulder

120 - Slippery surface

121 - Ice on the road

122 - Loose gravel

125-10 - Falling rocks (right side)

125-20 - Falling rocks (left side)

126 - Crosswinds

130 - Traffic congestion

131 - Roadworks

132 - Two-way traffic

135 - Traffic lights ahead

136 - Crossroad

140 - Pedestrians

141 - Children

142 - Pedestrian crossing ahead

143 - Bicycle crossing ahead

145-10 - Wild animals (deer)

145-11 - Wild animals (frogs)

146 - Domesticated animals

151 - Level crossing ahead

152-10 - Level crossing countdown beacon

152-11 - Level crossing countdown beacon

152-12 - Level crossing countdown beacon

152-50 - Crossbuck

152-51 - Crossbuck (electrified line)

152-52 - Crossbuck (vertical)

152-52 - Crossbuck (vertical, electrified line)

== Regulatory signs ==
201 - Give way

202 - Stop

203 - Give way to oncoming traffic

210-10 – Turn left

210-20 – Turn right

210-30 – Go straight

210-31 – Go straight and turn left

210-32 – Go straight and turn right

210-33 – Turn left or right

211-10 – Go left

211-20 – Go right

212-10 – Keep left

212-20 – Keep right

213 – Roundabout

215-10 – No left turn

215-20 – No right turn

216 – No U-turn

220 – Footpath

221 – Bicycle path

222 – Shared path for pedestrians and cyclists

223-50 – Separate path for pedestrians and cyclists (cyclists on the left)

223-51 – Separate path for pedestrians and cyclists (cyclists on the right)

224 - Bus line

225-50 – End of footpath

225-60 - End of bicycle path

225-70 - End of shared path for pedestrians and cyclists

225-80 – End of separate path for pedestrians and cyclists (cyclists on the left)

225-81 – End of separate path for pedestrians and cyclists (cyclists on the right)

230 – No entry

231 – No vehicles

232 - No motor vehicles

233-50 - No motor vehicles (except motorcycles with sidecar)

233-52 - No trucks

233-53 - No buses and trolleybuses

233-55 - No agricultural vehicles

233-56 - No motorcycles

233-57 - No mopeds

233-58 - No bicycles

233-60 - No pedestrians

233-63 - No horse carts

233-64 - No horse riders

233-72 - No vehicles with trailers

233-77 - No recreational vehicles

233-78 - No caravans

233-85 - No roller skating

234 - No vehicles carrying dangerous goods

235 - No vehicles carrying water-polluting goods

240 - Weight limit

241 - Axle weight limit

242 - Width limit

243 - Height limit

244 - Length limit

245-50 - Customs

245-51 - Police

248 - Low emission zone

249 - End of low emission zone

250 - Minimum speed limit

251 - Snow chains

253 - Maximum speed limit

254 - No overtaking

255 - No overtaking for trucks

256 - Keep your distance

260 - End of minimum speed limit

261 - No more snow chains

263 - End of maximum speed limit

264 - End of no overtaking

265 - End of no overtaking for trucks

267 - End of all restrictions

268 - Maximum speed limit zone

269 - End of maximum speed limit zone

270 - No stopping

270-10 - No stopping (diagonal-longitudinal positioning on the right, start of validity)

270-11 - No stopping (positioned diagonally/longitudinally on the left, end of validity)

270-20 - No stopping (positioned diagonally/longitudinally on the right, end of validity)

270-21 - No stopping (diagonal-longitudinal positioning on the left, start of validity)

270-30 - No stopping (positioned diagonally/longitudinally on the right, validity period)

270-31 - No stopping (positioned diagonally/longitudinally on the left, validity period)

271 - No parking

271-10 - No parking (diagonal-longitudinal positioning on the right, start of validity)

271-11 - No parking (positioned diagonally/longitudinally on the left, end of validity)

271-20 - No parking (positioned diagonally/longitudinally on the right, end of validity)

271-21 - No parking (diagonal-longitudinal positioning on the left, start of validity)

271-30 - No parking (positioned diagonally/longitudinally on the right, validity period)

271-31 - No parking (positioned diagonally/longitudinally on the left, validity period)

272 - Parking

272-10 - Parking (diagonal-longitudinal positioning on the right, start of validity, on the left, end of validity)

272-20 - Parking (positioned diagonally/longitudinally on the right: end of validity; on the left: start of validity)

272-30 - Parking (diagonal-longitudinal positioning on the right or left, period of validity)

272-50 - Parking building

273-50 - Parking on the sidewalk (partial, angled/longitudinal positioning on the left)

273-51 - Parking on the sidewalk (partial, diagonal-longitudinal positioning on the left, start of validity)

273-52 - Parking on the sidewalk (partial, diagonal-longitudinal positioning on the left, end of validity)

273-53 - Parking on the sidewalk (partial, angled/longitudinal positioning on the left, validity period)

273-55 - Parking on the sidewalk (partially, positioned diagonally/longitudinally on the right)

273-56 - Parking on the sidewalk (partial, angled/parallel positioning on the right, start of validity)

273-57 - Parking on the sidewalk (partial, angled-longitudinal positioning on the right, end of validity)

273-58 - Parking on the sidewalk (partial, angled/longitudinal positioning on the right, validity period)

273-60 - Parking on the sidewalk (fully, positioned diagonally/longitudinally on the left)

273-61 - Parking on the sidewalk (fully, angled/longitudinal positioning on the left, start of validity)

273-62 - Parking on the sidewalk (fully, angled/parallel positioning on the left, end of validity)

273-63 - Parking on the sidewalk (fully, angled/longitudinal positioning on the left, validity period)

273-65 - Parking on the sidewalk (fully, positioned diagonally/longitudinally on the right

273-66 - Parking on the sidewalk (fully, angled/longitudinal positioning on the right, start of validity)

273-67 - Parking on the sidewalk (fully, angled/parallel positioning on the right, end of validity)

273-68 - Parking on the sidewalk (fully, angled/longitudinal positioning on the right, validity period)

273-70 - Parking on the sidewalk (partially transverse, or angled/longitudinal positioning on the left)

273-71 - Parking on the sidewalk (partial transverse parking, diagonal/longitudinal positioning on the left, start of validity)

273-72 - Parking on the sidewalk (partial transverse, diagonal/longitudinal positioning on the left, end of validity)

273-73 - Parking on the sidewalk (partial transverse parking, diagonal/longitudinal positioning on the left, validity period)

273-75 - Parking on the sidewalk (partially transverse, positioned diagonally-longitudinally on the right)

273-76 - Parking on the sidewalk (partial transverse, diagonal/longitudinal positioning on the right, start of validity)

273-77 - Parking on the sidewalk (partially transverse, positioned diagonally-longitudinally on the right, end of validity)

273-78 - Parking on the sidewalk (partially transverse, positioned diagonally-longitudinally on the right, validity period)

273-80 - Parking on the sidewalk (fully transverse, positioned obliquely-longitudinally on the left)

273-81 - Parking on the sidewalk (fully transverse, positioned diagonally-longitudinally on the left, start of validity)

273-82 - Parking on the sidewalk (fully transverse, positioned diagonally-longitudinally on the left, end of validity)

273-83 - Parking on the sidewalk (fully transverse, positioned diagonally-longitudinally on the left, extent of validity)

273-85 - Parking on the sidewalk (fully transverse, positioned diagonally-longitudinally on the right)

273-86 - Parking on the sidewalk (fully transverse, positioned diagonally-longitudinally on the right, start of validity)

273-87 - Parking on the sidewalk (fully transverse, positioned diagonally-longitudinally on the right, end of validity)

273-88 - Parking on the sidewalk (fully transverse, positioned diagonally-longitudinally on the right, validity period)

275 - No parking zone

276 - End of no parking zone

277 - Parking zone

277 - End of parking zone

280-50 - Driving on the hard shoulder (2 lanes + hard shoulder)

280-51 - Driving on the hard shoulder (3 lanes + hard shoulder)

281-50 - Leave the hard shoulder (2 lanes + hard shoulder)

281-51 - Leave the hard shoulder (3 lanes + hard shoulder)

282-50 - End of driving on the hard shoulder (2 lanes + hard shoulder)

282-51 - End of driving on the hard shoulder (3 lanes + hard shoulder)

283-50 - Bypassing an obstacle via the hard shoulder (1 lane)

283-51 - Bypassing an obstacle via the hard shoulder (2 lanes)

== Information signs ==
301 - Crossroad with priority

301-20 - Crossroad with priority (from right side road)

302 - Priority road

303 - End of priority road

304 - Priority over oncoming traffic

305 - Urban area

306 - End of urban area

307 - Urban area (Bilingual)

308 - End of urban area (Bilingual)

309 - Motorway

310 - End of motorway

311 - Road for motor vehicles

312 - End of road for motor vehicles

313 - Motorway section subject to a vignette

314 - Highway section exempt from the highway vignette requirement

315 - Residential area

316 - End of residential area

317 - Pedestrian zone

318 - End of pedestrian zone

319 - School zone

320 - End of school zone

321-10 - One-way traffic (to left)

321-20 - One-way traffic (to right)

321-30 - One-way traffic

322-50 - Tunnel

322-51 - Tunnel (long, with a name and length)

323 - Bicycle street

324 - End of bicycle street

325-10 - Pedestrian crossing

325-20 - Pedestrian crossing

326-10 - Bicycle crossing

326-20 - Bicycle crossing

327-50 - Pedestrian underpass

327-51 - Pedestrian underpass (Ramped entrance)

327-60 - Pedestrian overpass

327-60 - Pedestrian overpass (Ramped entrance)

328 - Dead end

328 - Dead end (except for cyclists)

330-50 - Emergency call phone

330-52 - Gas station

330-53 - Gas station with alternative fuels

330-54 - LPG gas station

330-55 - CNG gas station

330-56 - Liquid hydrogen gas station

330-58 - Electric vehicle charging station, standalone charging station facility

330-59 - Electric vehicle charging station, service provided within another facility

330-60 - Hotel or motel

330-61 - Restaurant

330-62 - Refreshment

330-63 - Restroom

330-64 - accessible restroom

330-65 - Church

330-66 - Information

330-67 - Repair service

330-70 - Auto-camping

330-71 - Camping

330-72 - Space for motorhomes and caravans

330-73 - Space for motorhomes

330-74 - Swimming complex

330-75 - Indor swimming complex

330-76 - Stadium, arena

330-77 - Leisure sports complex

330-82 - Park and ride

330-83 - Secure truck parking

330-85 - Industrial zone

330-88 - Airport

330-89 - Port

330-91 - Railway station

330-92 - Car-carrying train

330-94 - Hospital

330-95 - First aid

330-97 - Shopping center

330-100 - Road information radio

331-50 - Bus stop

331-60 - Tram stop

332 - Taxi stand

333 - Police

334 - Speed control (radar)

335 - Emergency stopping area

336 - Emergency escape lane

340 - Local signal

== See also ==
- Road signs in the Czech Republic
- Road signs in Czechoslovakia
