= Road signs in Czechoslovakia =

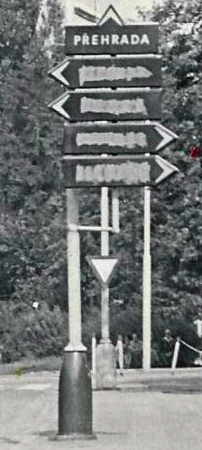
A Czechoslovak-era sign in Brno during Warsaw Pact invasion of Czechoslovakia in 1968, direction signs and street names were covered or removed.

Road signs in Czechoslovakia have their origins in the Austria-Hungary. The history of some elements of traffic signs dates back to the Middle Ages. The first attempts to introduce systematic orientation signs fall into the third quarter of the 19th century. In 1910, the first regulation was issued in Bohemia, without much success, which required the placement of warning signs in accordance with a concluded international treaty.

Systematic signs were carried out by the Autoclub of the Czechoslovak Republic on the basis of a contract with the ministry since 1928. The first warning road signs in Czechoslovakia were codified legislatively from November 1, 1935. In May 1938, traffic signs and signals covering the entire range of meanings were introduced.

From 1 November 1939, the colour design of warning traffic signs in the Protectorate of Bohemia and Moravia was changed to its current form. With further changes over the years, new types of signs were gradually added and some of their designs changed.

After the dissolution of Czechoslovakia, the federal decree from 1989 was still in force in Czechia and Slovakia for some time, but gradually both states developed their own legislation and the types and design of signs began to differ slightly.

== (1935-1939) ==
Rough road

Series of bends

Crossroad

Railroad crossing with barriers

Railroad crossing without barriers

Danger

Danger

Yield

No vehicles

Do not enter

No motor vehicles except motorcycles

No motorcycles

No motor vehicles

Weight limit

Weight limit for motor vehicles

Speed limit

No stopping

No parking

No overtaking

No beeping

Mandatory direction

Customs

Parking

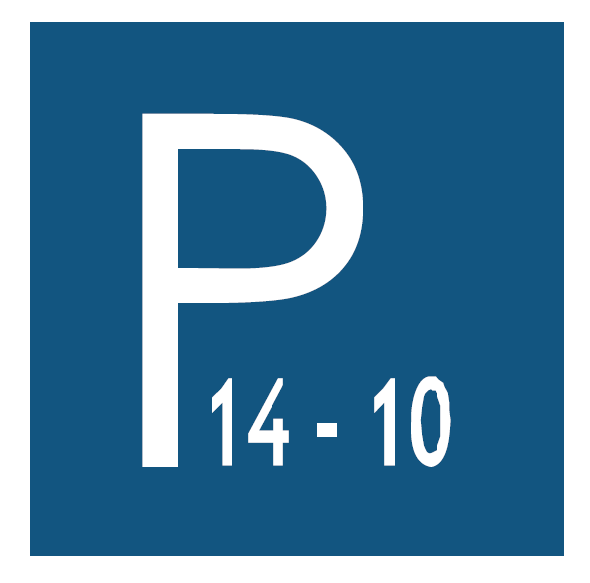
Parking allowed from 2pm to 10am

Caution

First aid

Direction sign

Urban area

=== 1938 addition ===
No bicycles

No horse carts

Width limit

Height limit

Priority road

Advance direction sign

City located in the direction of travel

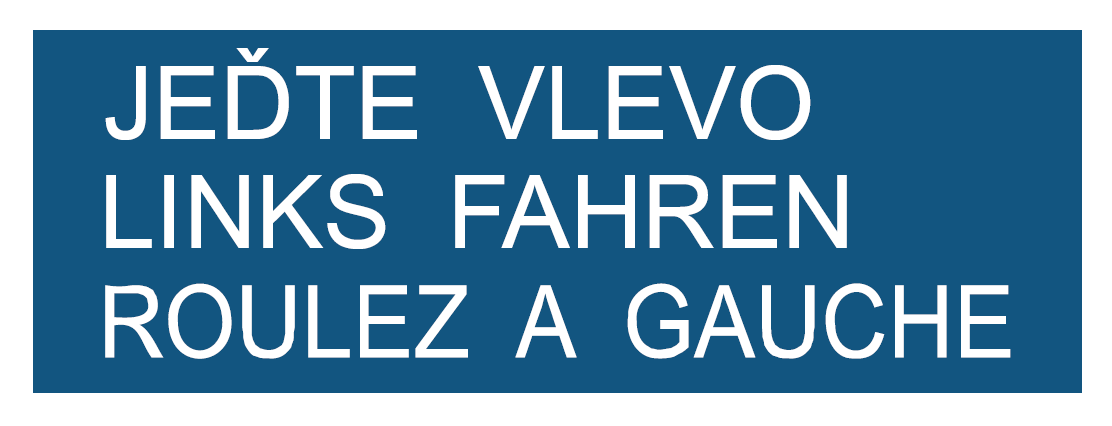
Drive to left

== (1939-1945) ==
Road signs in the Protectorate of Bohemia and Moravia (during nazi occupation)

=== Warning signs ===
Danger

Uneven road

Series of bends

Crossroad

Railway crossing with gates

Railway crossing without gates

Countdown beacon

Countdown beacon

Countdown beacon

Countdown beacon

=== Regulatory signs ===
No vehicles

No entry

No motor vehicles

No motorcycles

No motor vehicles (in weekends and holidays)

No motorcycles (in weekends and holidays)

Bicycle path

Weight limit

Width limit

Height limit

Speed limit

No stopping

No parking

Turn right

Proceed straight

Turn right ahead

Proceed straight or right

One-way traffic

Stop - Customs

Yield

Stop

Taxi stand

=== Information signs ===
Parking

Caution

First aid

Street Lighting not in use for the whole night

Over-voltage street lighting not in use for the whole night

Urban area begins

Urban area ends

Direction sign for highways

Direction sign

Direction sign for unpaved roads

Highway number

Ringroad or beltway for long-distance traffic

Advance direction sign

Priority road

Detour

== (1945-1951) ==
=== Warning signs ===
Danger

Rough road

Series of bends

Crossroad

Railroad crossing with gates

Railroad crossing without gates

Countdown beacon

Countdown beacon

Countdown beacon

Countdown beacon

=== Regulatory signs ===
No vehicles

No entry

No motor vehicles

No motorcycles

No motor vehicles (in weekends and holidays)

No motorcycles (in weekends and holidays)

Bicycle path

Weight limit

Width limit

Height limit

Speed limit

No stopping

No parking

Turn right

Proceed straight

Turn right ahead

Proceed straight or right

One-way traffic

Stop - Customs

Yield

Stop

Taxi stand

=== Information signs ===
Parking

Caution

First aid

Street Lighting not in use for the whole night

Over-voltage street lighting not in use for the whole night

Urban area begins

Urban area ends

Direction sign for highways

Direction sign

Direction sign for unpaved roads

Highway number

Ringroad or beltway for long-distance traffic

Advance direction sign

Priority road

Detour

== (1951-1961) ==
=== Warning signs ===
Rough road

Series of bends

Crossroad

Railroad crossing with gates

Railroad crossing without gates

Single crossbuck

Double crossbuck

Countdown beacon

Countdown beacon

Countdown beacon

Countdown beacon

Steep descent

Road narrows

Roadworks

Animals

Slippery road

Pedestrian crossing

Children

Crossroad with priority

Other danger

=== Regulatory signs ===
No vehicles

Do not enter

No motor vehicles except motorcycles

No motorcycles

No motor vehicles

No trucks

Width limit

Height limit

Weight limit

Weight limit for single vehicle

No bicycles

No horse carts

Speed limit

Speed limit ends

No overtaking

No right turn

No left turn

Stop - customs

No parking

No parking at specified time

No stopping

Other restriction (no through road)

Yield

Stop

Keep left

Keep right

Proceed straight

Turn left

Turn right

Proceed straight or right

Proceed straight or left

Bicycle path

Other mandatory (for riders)

=== Information signs ===
Parking

Time-restricted parking

Taxi stand

Hospital

First aid

Repair service

Public telephone

Petrol station

Priority road

Priority road ends

One-way traffic

Ringroad or beltway for long-distance traffic

Urban area begins

Urban area ends

Direction sign for highways (variant 1)

Direction sign for highways (variant 2)

Direction sign

Direction sign for unpaved roads

Advance direction sign

Highway number

Detour

== (1961-1967) ==
=== Warning signs ===
Rough road

Right curve

Left curve

Double right curve

Double left curve

Crossroad

Railroad crossing with gates

Railroad crossing without gates

Single crossbuck

Double crossbuck

Countdown beacon

Countdown beacon

Countdown beacon

Countdown beacon

Steep descent

Road narrows

Roadworks

Slippery road

Pedestrian crossing

Children

Animals (domesticated)

Animals (wild)

Crossroad with priority

Other danger

Yield

=== Regulatory signs ===
No vehicles

Do not enter

No right turn

No left turn

No overtaking

No overtaking ends

No overtaking by trucks

No overtaking by trucks ends

No motor vehicles except motorcycles

No motorcycles

No motor vehicles

No trucks

No bicycles

No horse carts

Width limit

Height limit

Weight limit

Weight limit for single vehicle

Maximum speed limit

Maximum speed limit ends

Stop

Stop - Customs

No stopping

No parking

No parking at specified time

No parking ends

No honking

No honking ends

Yield to oncoming traffic

Other restriction (no through road)

Proceed straight

Turn left

Turn right

Proceed straight or right

Proceed straight or left

Keep right

Keep left

Roundabout

Bicycle path

Minimum speed limit

Minimum speed limit ends

Other mandatory (walk to left)

=== Information signs ===
Parking

Time-restricted parking

Taxi stand

Hospital

First aid

Repair service

Public telephone

Petrol station

Priority road

Priority road ends

One-way traffic

Priority over oncoming traffic

Camping

Advance direction sign

Direction sign

Direction sign for unpaved roads

Direction of a camping site

Urban area

Highway number

Long-distance highway number

Detour

== (1967-1975) ==
=== Warning signs ===
Right curve

Left curve

Double right curve

Double left curve

Crossroad

Crossroad with priority

Steep descent

Road narrows

Rough road

Slippery road

Two-way traffic

Traffic lights ahead

Pedestrian crossing ahead

Children

Animals (domesticated)

Animals (wild)

Roadworks

Railroad crossing with gates

Railroad crossing without gates

Other danger

Countdown beacon

Countdown beacon

Countdown beacon

Single crossbuck

Double crossbuck

=== Regulatory signs ===
Yield

Yield to trams

Stop

No vehicles

Do not enter

No motor vehicles except motorcycles

No trucks

No agricultural vehicles

No motorcycles

No bicycles

No horse carts

No motor vehicles

Weight limit

Width limit

Height limit

Maximum speed limit

Maximum speed limit ends

No overtaking

No overtaking ends

No overtaking by trucks

No overtaking by trucks ends

No honking

No honking ends

No right turn

No left turn

No U-turn

Yield to oncoming traffic

Stop - customs

Other restriction (no through road)

No stopping

No parking

Alternative parking

Alternative parking

Proceed straight

Turn right

Turn left

Turn left or right

Proceed straight or right

Proceed straight or left

Keep right

Keep left

Roundabout

Minimum speed limit

Footpath

Bicycle path

Other mandatory (walk to left)

=== Information signs ===
One-way traffic

One-way traffic

Priority road

Priority road ends

Pedestrian crossing

Priority over oncoming traffic

Dead end

Parking

Hospital

First aid

Repair service

Public telephone

Petrol station

Camping

Caravan site

Camping and caravan site

Advance direction sign

Advance direction sign with restriction

Preselection sign

Direction sign

Detour

Direction of a camping site

Urban area

Highway number

Long-distance highway number

=== Additional signs ===
Number of danger

Crossroad shape

Priority road direction

Distance to the object

Stop ahead

Section length

Gross weight

Start of section

Route of the section

End of section

=== 1971 addition ===
Crosswinds

Motorway

Motorway ends

Road for motor vehicles

Road for motor vehicles ends

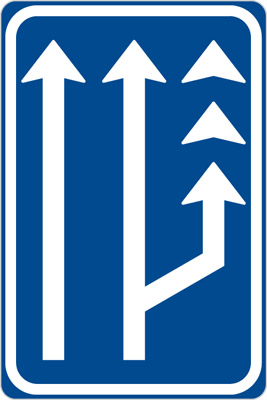
Clawer line

Number of lanes increases

Number of lanes decreases

Hotel or motel

Restaurant

Refreshment

Toilet

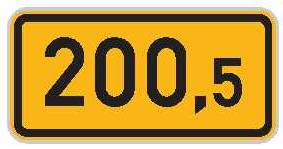
Kilometer marker

== (1975-1989) ==
=== Warning signs ===
Right curve

Left curve

Double right curve

Double left curve

Crossroad

Crossroad with priority

Steep descent

Steep ascent

Road narrows (both sides)

Road narrows (right side)

Road narrows (left side)

Rough road

Slippery road

Two-way traffic

Traffic lights ahead

Pedestrian crossing ahead

Children

Animals (domesticated)

Animals (wild)

Roadworks

Crosswinds

Loose gravel

Falling rocks

Bicycle crossing

Low-flying planes

Tunnel

Other danger

Railroad crossing with gates

Railroad crossing without gates

Countdown beacon

Countdown beacon

Countdown beacon

Single crossbuck

Double crossbuck

=== Prohibitory signs ===
No vehicles

Do not enter

No motor vehicles except motorcycles

No trucks

No buses

No agricultural vehicles

No motorcycles

No bicycles

No horse carts

No handcarts

No motor vehicles

Weight limit

Axle weight limit

Width limit

Height limit

Length limit

No vehicles carrying dangerous goods

No vehicles carrying water-polluting goods

Maximum speed limit

Maximum speed limit ends

No overtaking

No overtaking ends

No overtaking by trucks

No overtaking by trucks ends

No honking

No honking ends

No right turn

No left turn

No U-turn

Yield to oncoming traffic

Stop - customs

No stopping

No parking

No pedestrians

Other restriction (no through road)

=== Mandatory signs ===
Yield

Yield to trams

Stop

Roundabout

Proceed straight

Turn right

Turn left

Turn left or right

Proceed straight or right

Proceed straight or left

Keep right

Keep left

Minimum speed limit

Minimum speed limit ends

Footpath

Bicycle path

Other mandatory (turn on the lights)

=== Information signs ===
Priority road

Priority road ends

Beltway

Change of beltway direction

One-way traffic

One-way traffic

One-way traffic

Recommended speed limit

Pedestrian crossing

Priority over oncoming traffic

Pedestrian underpass

Dead end

Dead end direction

Hospital

Parking

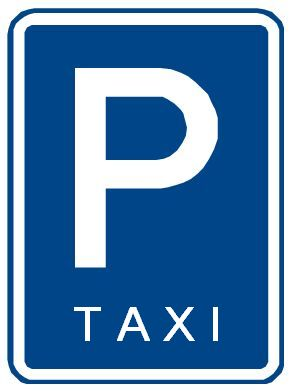
Taxi stand

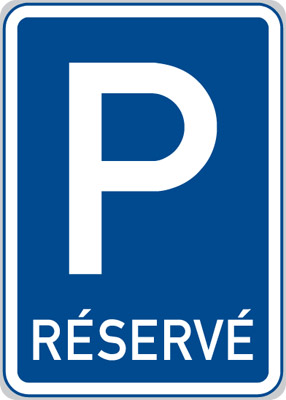
Reserved parking

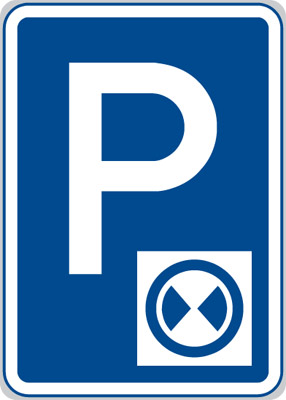
Parking with permit (disc)

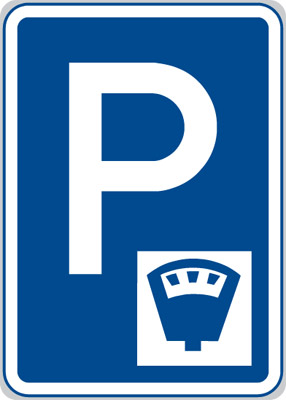
Metered parking

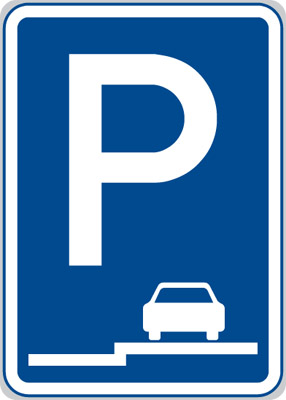
Parking on the pavement (in line with traffic)

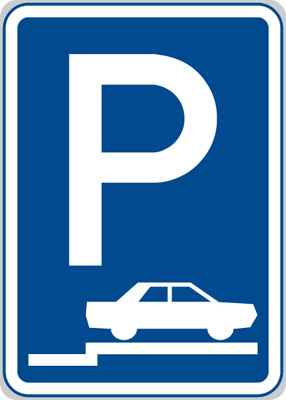
Parking on the pavement (at right angles or diagonal to traffic)

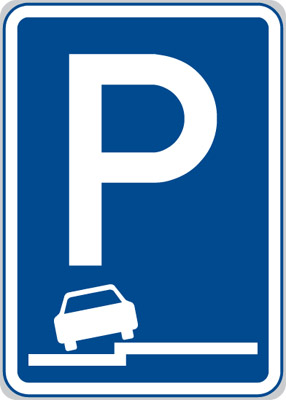
Parking partly on the pavement (in line with traffic)

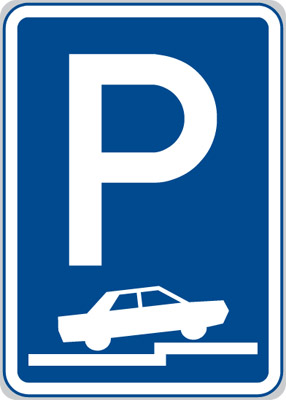
Parking partly on the pavement (at right angles or diagonal to traffic)

Motorway

Motorway ends

Road for motor vehicles

End of road for motor vehicles

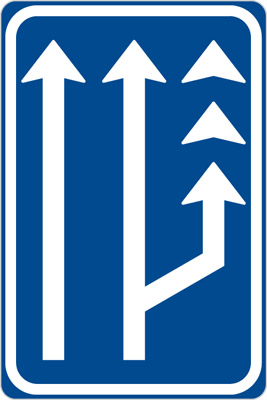
Crawler lane

Number of lanes increases

Number of lanes decreases

First aid

Repair service

Public telephone

Petrol station

Camping

Caravan site

Camping and caravan site

Hotel or motel

Restaurant

Refreshment

Toilet

Bus stop

Tram stop

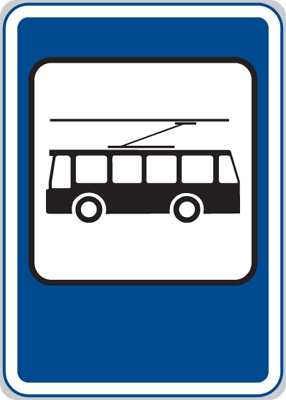
Trolleybus stop

Advance direction sign

Advance direction sign with restriction

Preselection sign

Advance direction sign with restriction

Route indicator (single destination)

Route indicator (two destinations)

Direction sign (single destination)

Direction sign (two destinations)

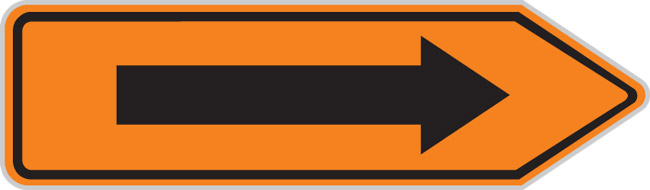
Detour

Detour scheme

Direction of a camping site

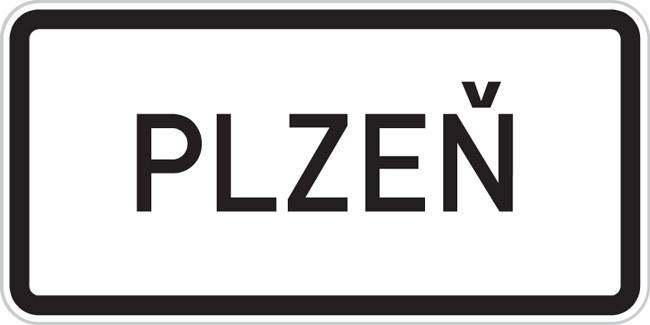
Urban area begins

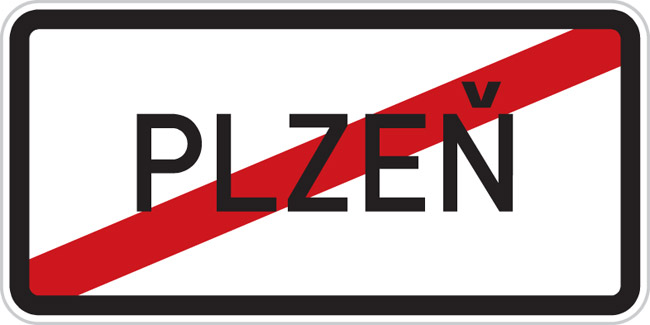
Urban area ends

Highway number

Long-distance highway number

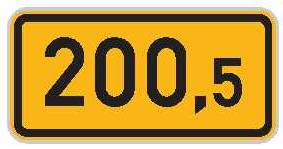
Kilometer marker

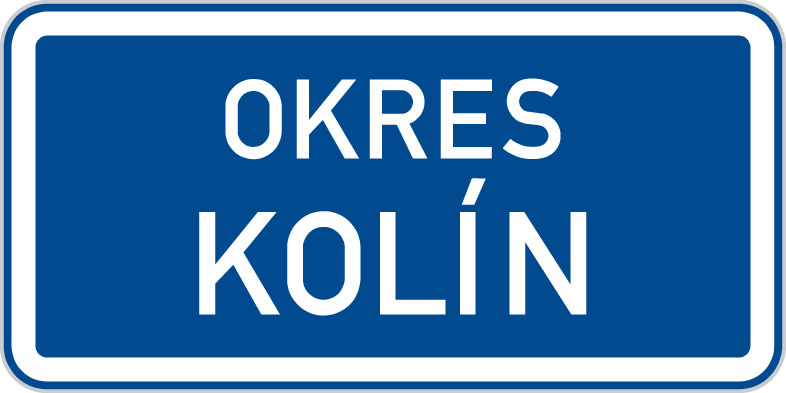
Boundaries of the territorial unit

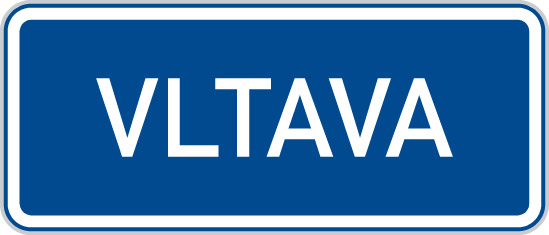
Alternative name

=== Additional signs ===
Number of danger

Crossroad shape

Priority road direction

The shape of two crossroads

Distance to the object

Stop ahead

Section length

Gross weight

Dangerous road shoulder

Start of section

Route of the section

End of section

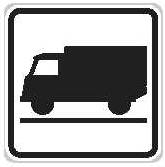
Vehicle type

=== Special signs ===
Caution, change of arrangement (change of priority)

Drive left alongside tramway

Change of driving direction

No parking zone

No parking zone ends

== (1989-1992) ==
After the dissolution of Czechoslovakia, this standard was used in the Czech Republic until 2001 and in Slovakia until 1994.

=== Warning signs ===
Right curve

Left curve

Double right curve

Double left curve

Crossroad

Crossroad with priority

Steep descent

Steep ascent

Road narrows (both sides)

Road narrows (right side)

Road narrows (left side)

Rough road

Slippery road

Two-way traffic

Traffic lights ahead

Pedestrian crossing ahead

Children

Animals (domesticated)

Animals (wild)

Roadworks

Crosswinds

Loose gravel

Falling rocks

Bicycle crossing

Low-flying planes

Tunnel

Other danger

Railroad crossing with gates

Railroad crossing without gates

Countdown beacon

Countdown beacon

Countdown beacon

Single crossbuck

Double crossbuck

Tram crossing

=== Prohibitory signs ===
No vehicles

Do not enter

No motor vehicles except motorcycles

No trucks

No buses

No agricultural vehicles

No motorcycles

No bicycles

No horse carts

No handcarts

No motor vehicles

Weight limit

Axle weight limit

Width limit

Height limit

Length limit

No vehicles carrying dangerous goods

No vehicles carrying water-polluting goods

Maximum speed limit

Maximum speed limit ends

No overtaking

No overtaking ends

No overtaking by trucks

No overtaking by trucks ends

No honking

No honking ends

No right turn

No left turn

No U-turn

Yield to oncoming traffic

Stop - customs

No stopping

No parking

No pedestrians

Other restriction (no through road)

All restrictions ends

=== Mandatory signs ===
Yield

Yield to trams

Stop

Roundabout

Proceed straight

Turn right

Turn left

Turn left or right

Proceed straight or right

Proceed straight or left

Keep right

Keep left

Keep right or left

Minimum speed limit

Minimum speed limit ends

Footpath

Bicycle path

Shared pathway for cyclists and pedestrians

Other mandatory (turn on the lights)

=== Information signs ===
Priority road

Priority road ends

Beltway

Change of beltway direction

One-way traffic

One-way traffic

One-way traffic

Recommended speed limit

Pedestrian crossing

Priority over oncoming traffic

Pedestrian underpass

Dead end

Dead end direction

Hospital

Parking

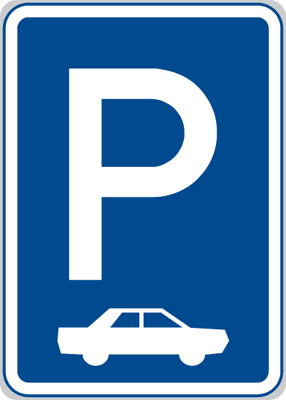
Parking (at right angles or diagonal to traffic)

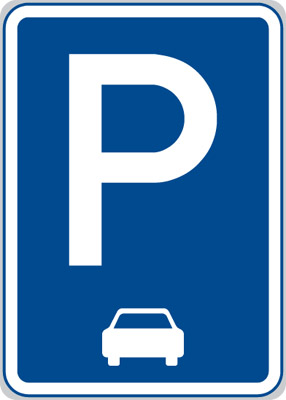
Parking (in line with traffic)

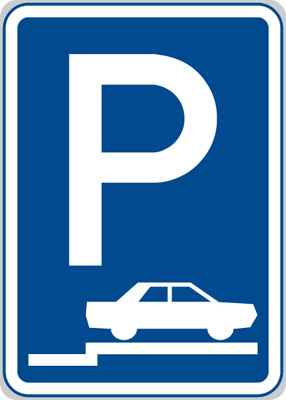
Parking on the pavement (at right angles or diagonal to traffic)

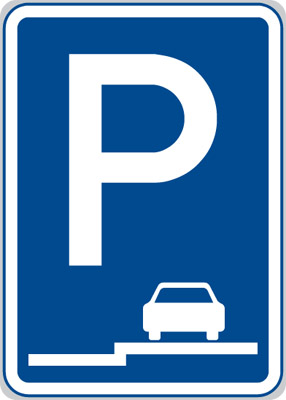
Parking on the pavement (in line with traffic)

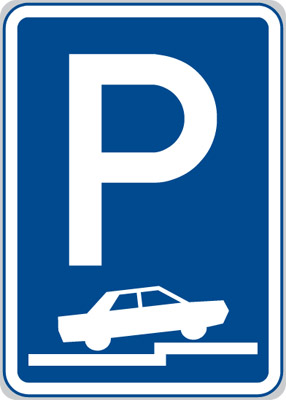
Parking partly on the pavement (at right angles or diagonal to traffic)

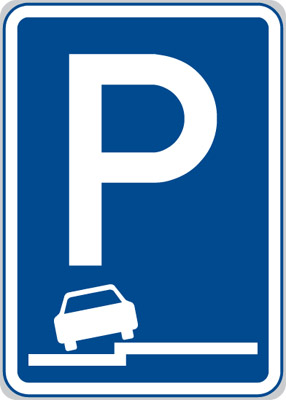
Parking partly on the pavement (in line with traffic)

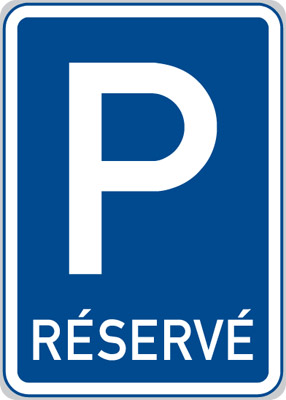
Reserved parking

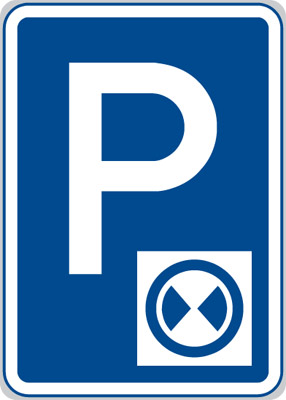
Parking with permit (disc)

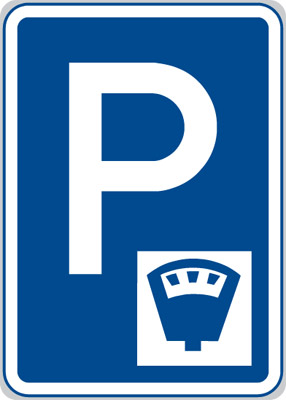
Metered parking

Motorway

Motorway ends

Road for motor vehicles

End of road for motor vehicles

Lane arrangement

Number of lanes increases

Number of lanes decreases

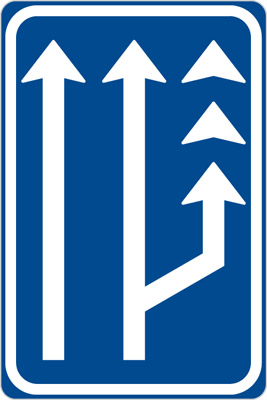
Crawler lane

Preselection sign

Restrictions in lane

Bus line

Bus line ends

First aid

Public telephone

Petrol station

Repair service

Camping

Caravan site

Camping and caravan site

Hotel or motel

Restaurant

Refreshment

Toilet

Bus stop

Tram stop

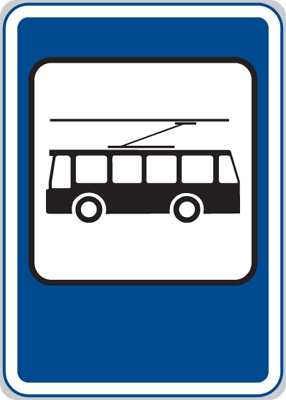
Trolleybus stop

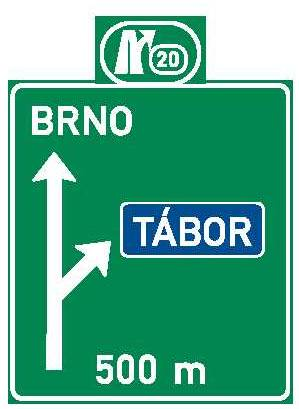
Advance direction sign (in motorways)

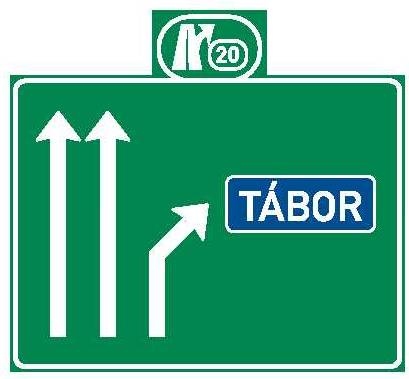
Advance direction sign (in motorways)

Route indicator with direction for motorways

Route indicator with direction for road for motor vehicles

Advance direction sign

Advance direction sign with restriction

Advance direction sign with restriction

Route indicator (single destination)

Route indicator (two destinations)

Direction sign (single destination)

Direction sign (two destinations)

Direction sign (local destinations)

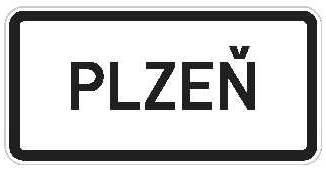
Urban area begins

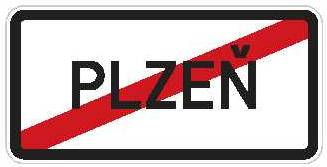
Urban area ends

Highway number

E-road indicator

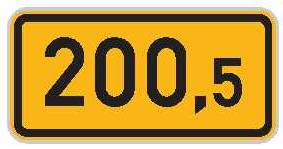
Kilometer marker

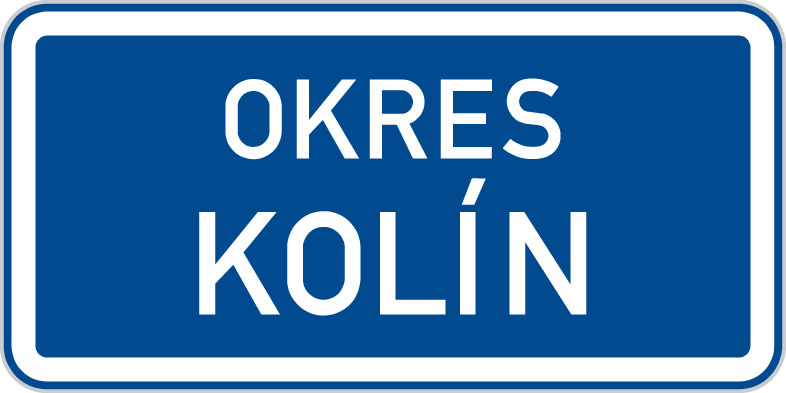
Boundaries of the territorial unit

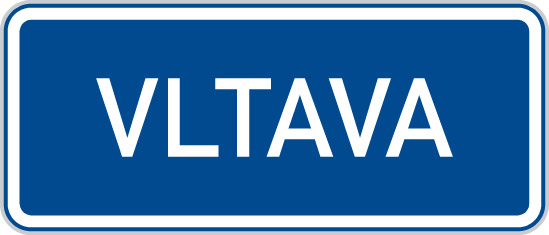
Alternative name

Detour direction

Detour

Detour

Caution, change of arrangement (change of priority)

Change of driving direction

Drive left alongside tramway

No parking zone

No parking zone ends

Home zone

Home zone ends

Pedestrian zone

Pedestrian zone ends

=== Additional signs ===
Number of danger

Crossroad shape

Priority road direction

The shape of two crossroads

Distance to the object

Stop ahead

Section length

Gross weight

Wet coating

Dangerous road shoulder

Start of section

Route of the section

End of section

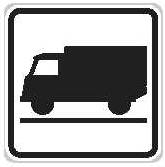
Vehicle type

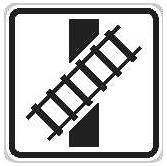
Configuration of the crossing between a road and a railroad

=== 1997 addition ===
Traffic congestion

Emergency escape lane

== See also ==
- Road signs in the Czech Republic
- Road signs in Slovakia
