= Road signs in the Czech Republic =

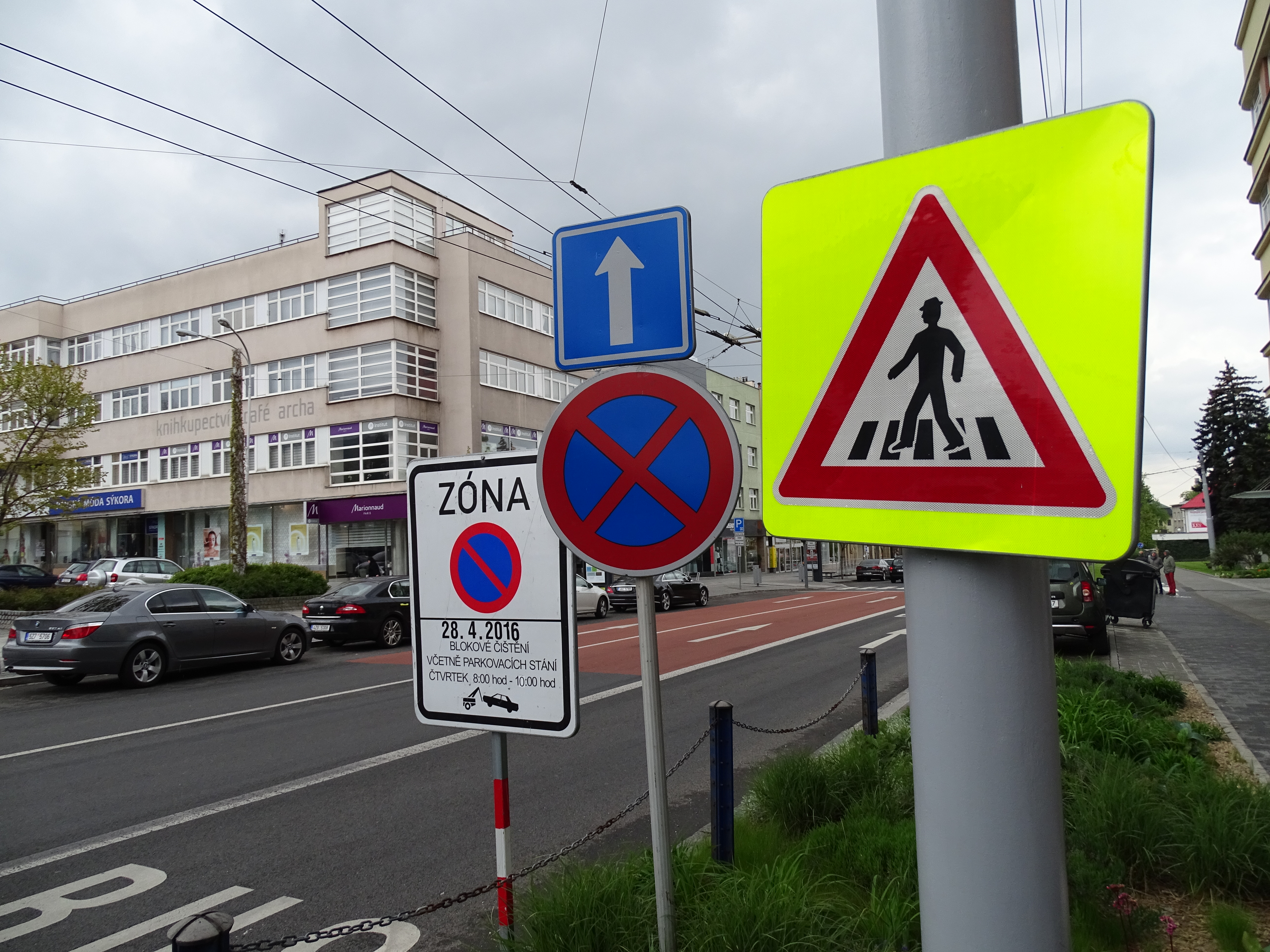
Road signs located in Zlín

Road signs in Czechia are regulated by the Ministry of Transport and the police. The signs are nearly the same as the European norm, but with small changes (for example, text is in Czech and there are some differences in colour). The law governing the road signs is decree 294/2015 Sb., in force since 1 January 2016.

Czech road signs depict people with realistic (as opposed to stylized) silhouettes.

Czechoslovakia had originally signed the Vienna Convention on Road Signs and Signals on November 8, 1968, and ratified it on June 7, 1978. After the dissolution of Czechoslovakia, which took effect on December 31, 1992, Czechia succeeded to the Vienna Convention on June 2, 1993.

== Warning signs ==
I-1a: Dangerous curve to the right

I-1b: Dangerous curve to the left

I-2a: Double curve, first to the right

I-2b: Double curve, first to the left

I-3: Intersection

I-4: Intersection with a roundabout

I-5a: Dangerous descent

I-5b: Dangerous ascent

I-6a: Road narrows from both sides

I-6b: Road narrows from the right side

I-7a: Uneven road

I-7b: Speed bumps

I-8: Slippery road

I-9: Two-way traffic

I-10: Traffic signals

I-11: Pedestrian crossing

I-12a: Pedestrians

I-12b: Children

I-12c: Persons on personal transporters

I-13: Domesticated animals

I-14: Wild animals

I-15: Roadworks

I-16: Crosswinds

I-17: Loose chippings

I-18: Falling rocks

I-19: Cyclists

I-20: Airport

I-21: Tunnel

I-22: Other dangers

I-23: Traffic queues

I-24: Ice or snow

I-25: Tramway

I-26
Fog

I-27: Accident

I-28: Dangerous hard shoulder

I-29: Level crossing with barriers

I-30: Level crossing without barriers

I-31a: Distance marker (240 m)

I-31b: Distance marker (160 m)

I-31c: Distance marker (80 m)

I-32a: Single-track level crossing

I-32b: Multiple-tracks level crossing

I-33: Mobile bridge

I-34: Unprotected riverbank

== Priority signs ==
II-1
Crossroad with minor road

II-1
Side road to the left

II-1
Side road to the right

II-2: Priority road/crossroad

II-3: End of priority road/crossroad

II-4: Yield

II-5
Yield to trams

II-6: Stop and give way

II-7: Oncoming traffic have priority

II-8: Priority over oncoming traffic

== Prohibitive or restrictive signs ==
III-1: No entry for vehicles (both directions)

III-2: No entry for vehicles

III-3a: No entry for motor vehicles, except motorcycles

III-3b: No cars

III-4: No lorries

III-5: No buses

III-6: No tractors

III-7: No motorcycles

III-8: No cycles

III-9: No animal-drawn vehicles

III-10: No handcarts

III-11: No motor vehicles

III-12: No entry to the vehicles indicated

III-13: No vehicles heavier than indicated

III-14: No vehicles with axle weight greater than indicated

III-15: No vehicles wider than indicated

III-16: No vehicles taller than indicated

III-17: No vehicles or combinations longer than indicated

III-18: No vehicles carrying hazardous cargo

III-19: No vehicles carrying cargo that may cause water pollution

III-20a: Speed limit

III-20b: End of speed limit

III-21a: No overtaking

III-21b: End of no overtaking

III-22a: No overtaking by lorries

III-22b: End of no overtaking for lorries

III-23a: No use of audible warning signals

III-23b: End of no audible warnings zone

III-24a: No right turn

III-24b: No left turn

III-25: No U-turn

III-26: End of all prohibitions

III-27b
Obligation to stop (traffic control)

III-27a
Obligation to stop (police)

III-28: No stopping and no parking

III-29: No parking

III-30: No pedestrians

III-30a: No entry to persons on personal transporters

III-31: No animal riders

III-32: Other prohibition (Driving through forbidden)
(formerly used before 2016)

III-33: No vehicles towing trailers

III-34: Minimum distance between vehicles

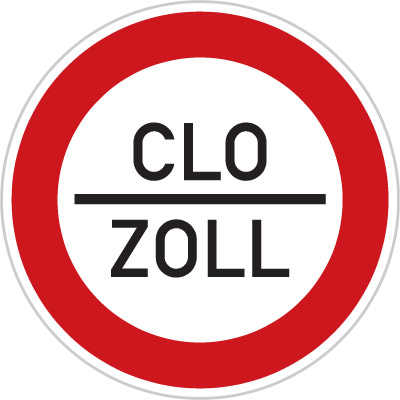
III-35
Stop for customs

== Mandatory signs ==
IV-1: Roundabout

IV-2a: Proceed straight

IV-2b: Turn right ahead

IV-2c: Turn left ahead

IV-2d: Proceed straight or right only

IV-2e: Proceed straight or left only

IV-2f: Turn left or right only

IV-3a: Turn right here

IV-3b: Turn left here

IV-4a: Pass on right

IV-4b: Pass on left

IV-4c: Pass on left or right

IV-5a: Snow chains compulsory

IV-5b: End of compulsory snow chains zone

IV-6a: Minimum speed limit

IV-6b: End of minimum speed limit

IV-7a: Pedestrian path

IV-7b: End of pedestrian path

IV-8a: Cycleway

IV-8b: End of cycleway

IV-9a: Shared pedestrian and cycle path

IV-9b: End of shared pedestrian and cycle path

IV-10a: Separated pedestrian and cycle path

IV-10b: End of separated pedestrian and cycle path

IV-11a: Bridle path

IV-11b: End of bridle path

IV-12a: Indicated vehicles may use only this lane

IV-12b: Indicated vehicles may use only this lane – end

IV-13a: Use headlights

IV-13b: Use headlights – end of zone

IV-14a: Other command

IV-14b: End of other command

IV-15a: Winter equipment

IV-15b: Winter equipment – end

== Information and service signs ==
V-1
Circular route
(formerly used)

V-2
Turn to follow circular route
(formerly used)

V-3
Speed bumps

V-4
Underpass or elevated walkway

V-5a
One-way traffic (left)

V-5b
One-way traffic (right)

V-6
One-way street

V-7
Recommended speed (70 km/h)

V-8
Pedestrian crossing

V-9
Cycle crossing

V-10
Tunnel

V-11
End of tunnel

V-12
Emergency parking

V-13a
No through road (dead end)

V-13b
Entrance to dead end road from right

V-13c
Entrance to dead end road from left

V-14
Parking place

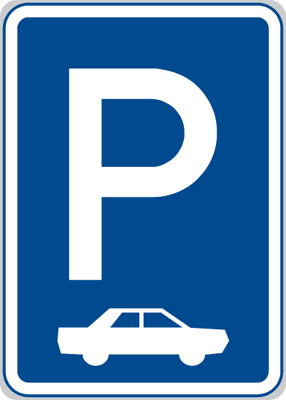
V-14a
Parking (at right angles or diagonal to traffic)

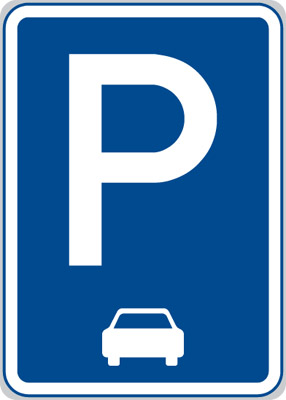
V-14b
Parking (in line with traffic)

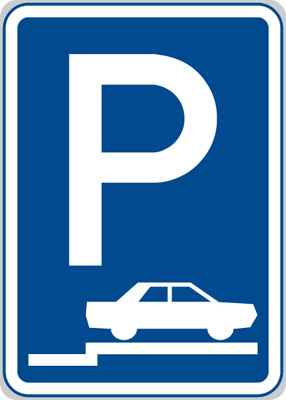
V-14c
Parking on the pavement (at right angles or diagonal to traffic)

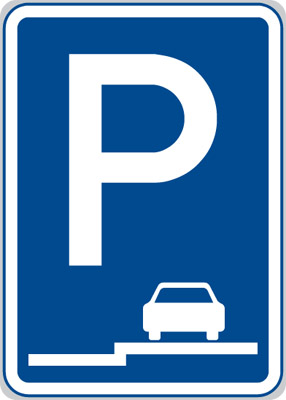
V-14d
Parking on the pavement (in line with traffic)

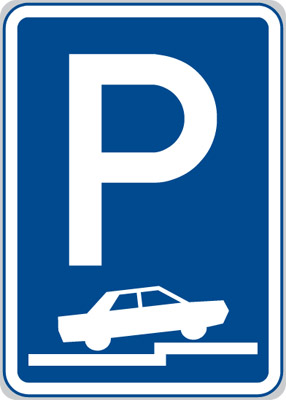
V-14e
Parking partly on the pavement (at right angles or diagonal to traffic)

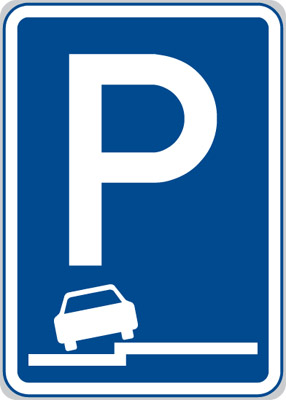
V-14f
Parking partly on the pavement (in line with traffic)

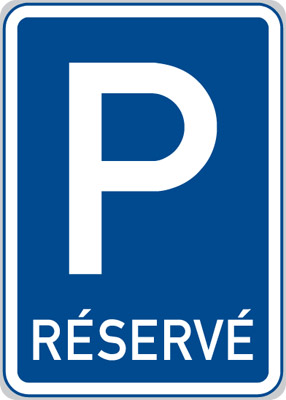
V-14g
Reserved parking

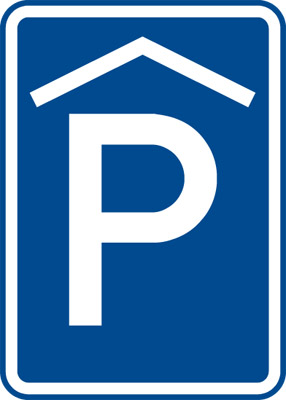
V-15
Covered parking

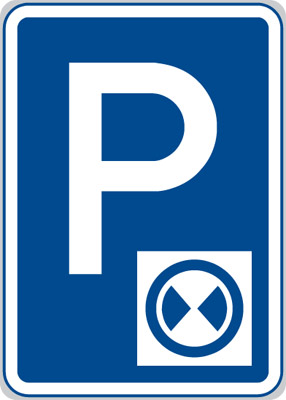
V-16
Parking with permit (disc)

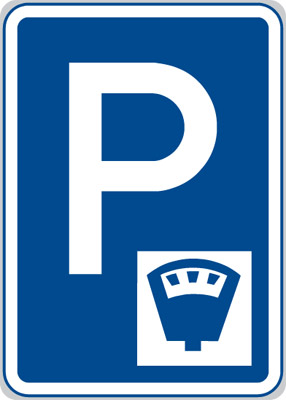
V-17
Metered parking

V-19
Expressway (speed limit 130 km/h implied, 80 km/h in city)

V-20
End of expressway (speed limit 90 km/h implied)

V-21
Road for motor vehicles (speed limit 110 km/h implied, 80 km/h in city)

V-22
End of road for motor vehicles (speed limit 90 km/h implied)

V-23a
Lanes diverge

V-23b
Lane arrangement

V-25
Restrictions in lane

V-26
Lane arrangement

V-27
Number of lanes increases

V-28
Number of lanes decreases

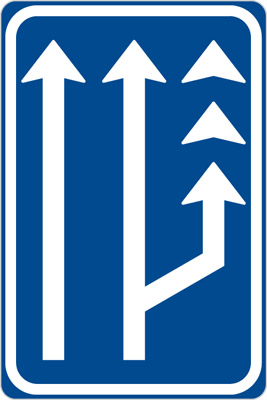
V-29
Crawler lane

V-30
Bus lane

V-31
End of bus lane

V-32
Caution, change of arrangement (end of priority way)

V-33
Drive left around tram

V-34
Drive left alongside tramway

V-35
Escape lane (in case of brake failure)

V-36a
Speed limit zone

V-36b
End of speed limit zone

V-37a
Zone having the restriction indicated

V-37b
End of zone having the restriction indicated

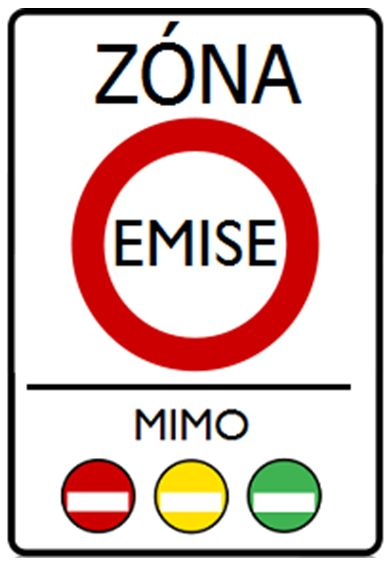
V-38a
Low emission zone

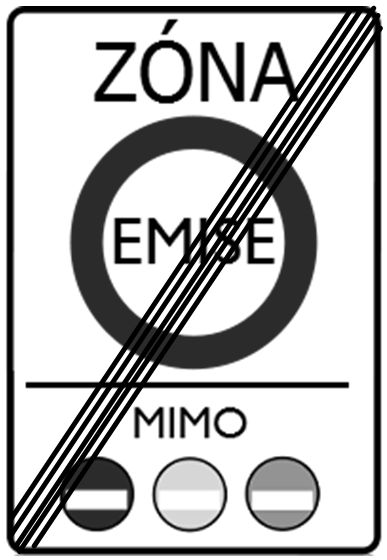
V-38b
End of low emission zone

V-39a
Residential area (speed limit 20 km/h implied)

V-39b
End of residential area (end of speed limit 20 km/h implied)

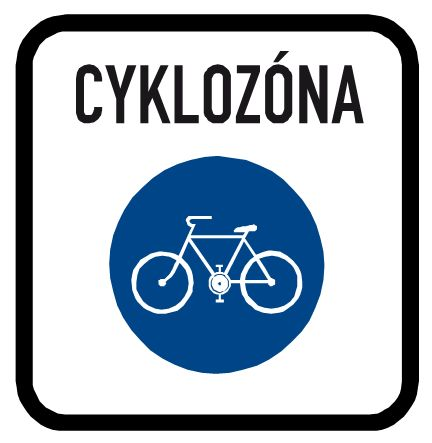
V-40a
Cyclists zone

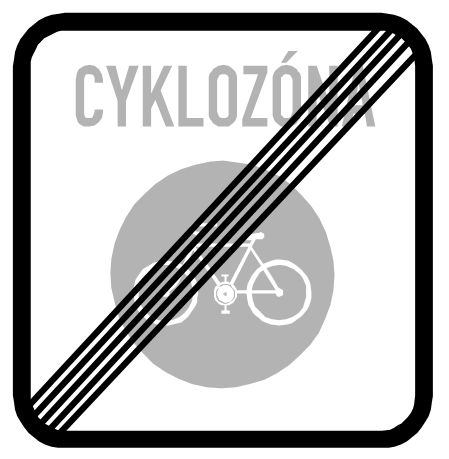
V-40b
End of cyclists zone

V-41a
Pedestrian zone (supply may enter in indicated times)

V-41b
End of pedestrian zone

V-43a
Automatic speed control

V-43b
End of automatic speed control

V-45
Border crossing

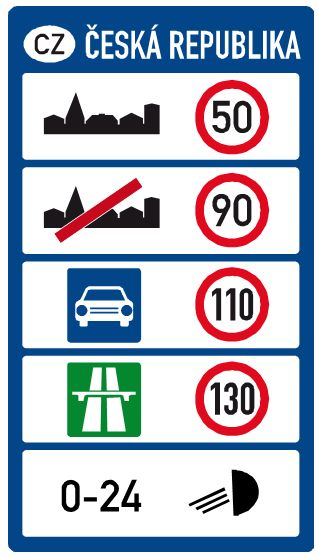
V-47a
Maximum speed limits (passenger cars only)

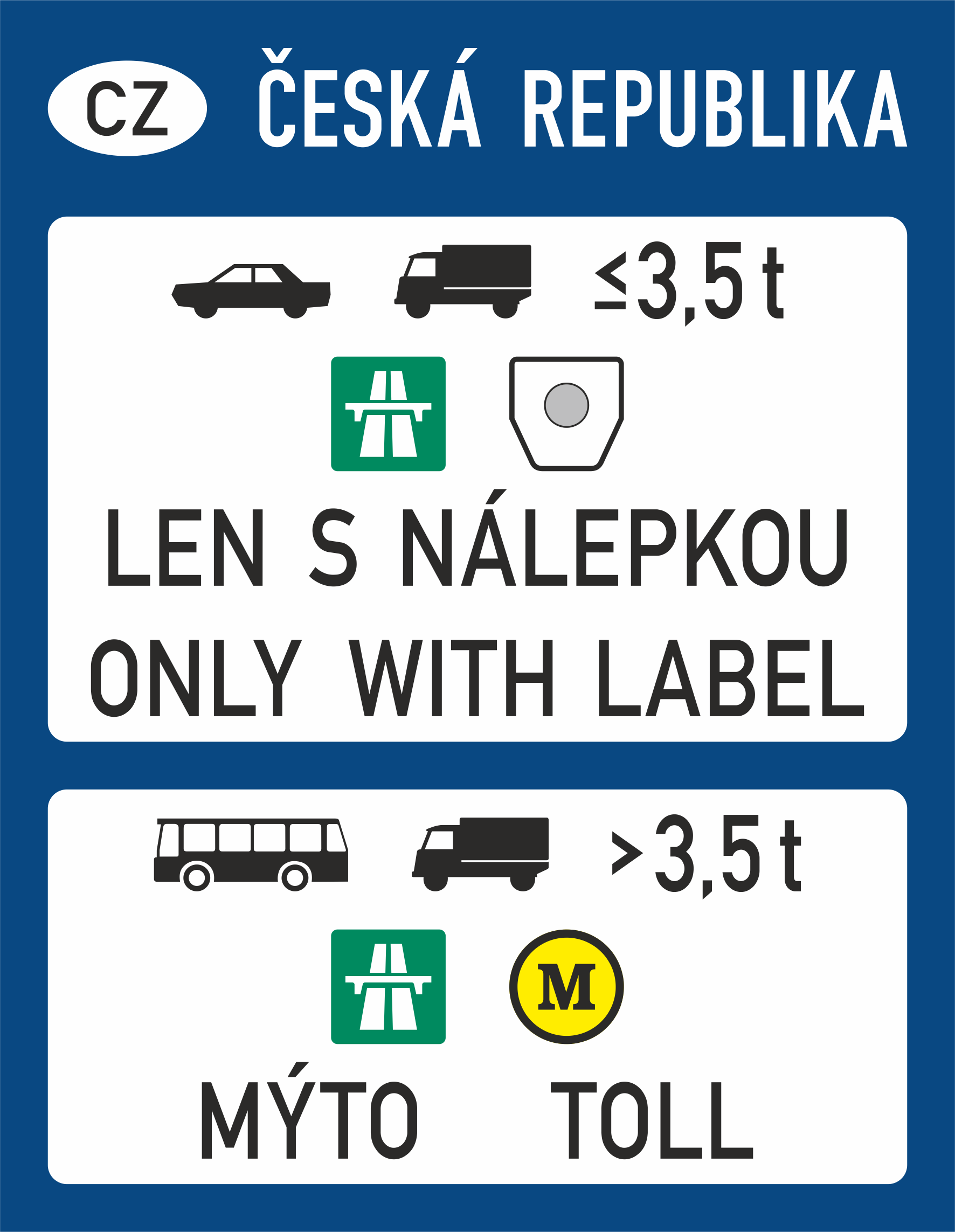
V-47b
Road payments in Czechia

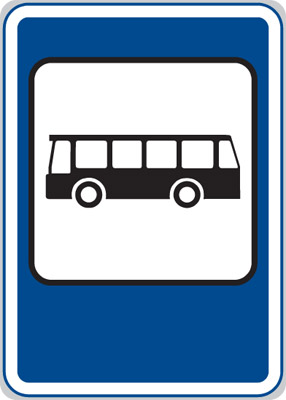
V-48
Bus stop

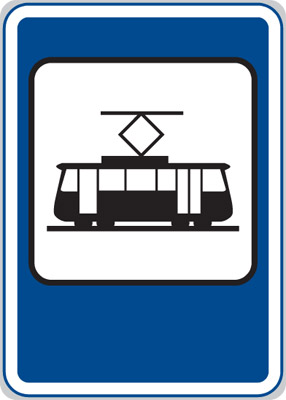
V-49
Tram stop

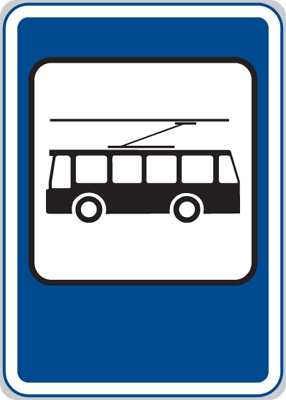
V-50
Trolleybus stop

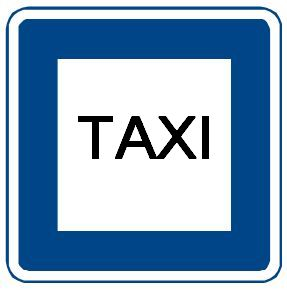
V-51
Taxi stand

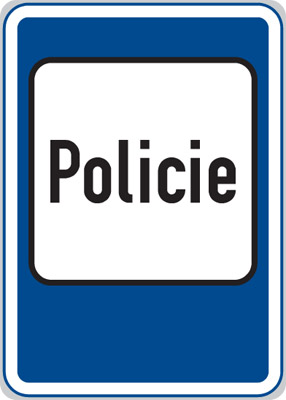
VI-1
Police

VI-2a
Hospital

VI-2b
First aid

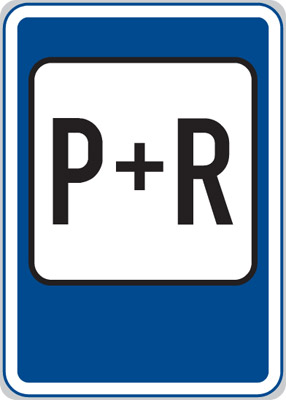
VI-3a
Park and ride

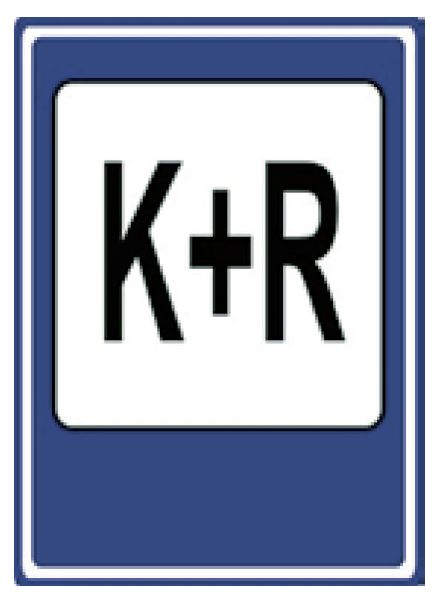
VI-3b
Kiss and ride

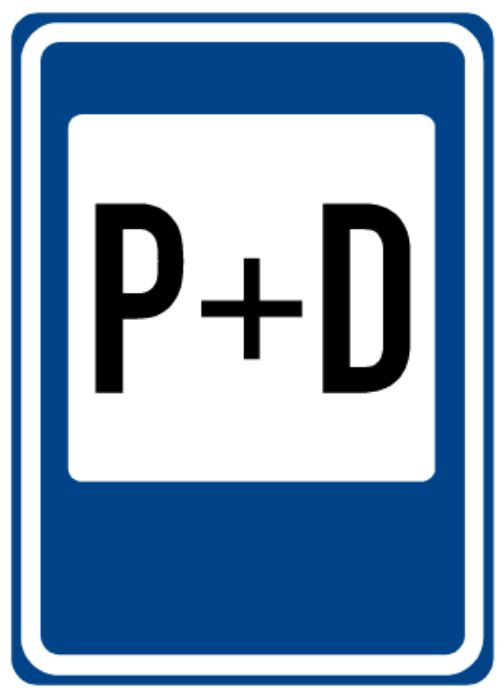
VI-3c
Park and drive

VI-4
Information

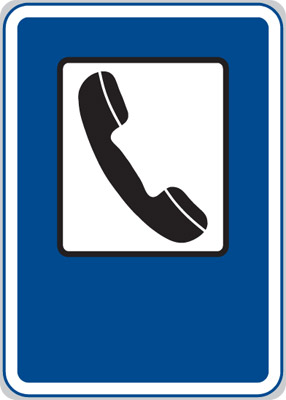
VI-5
Telephone

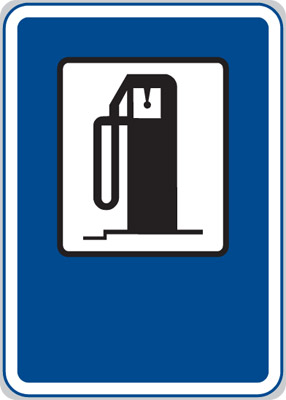
VI-6
Filling station

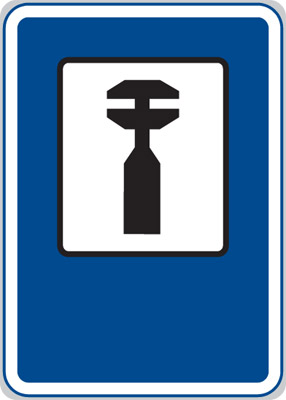
VI-8
Repair shop

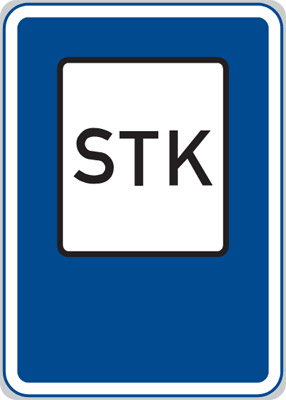
VI-9
Vehicle inspection station

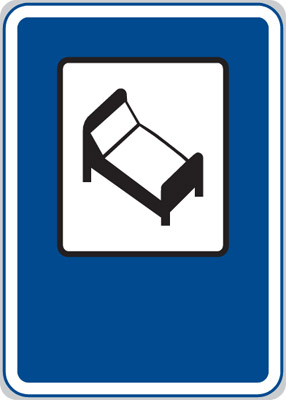
VI-12
Hotel or motel

VI-13
Restaurant

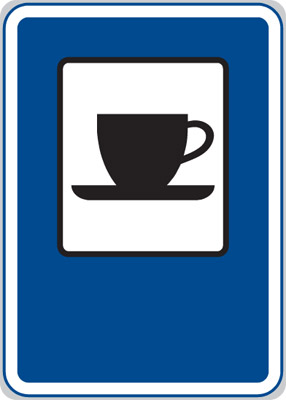
VI-14
Café

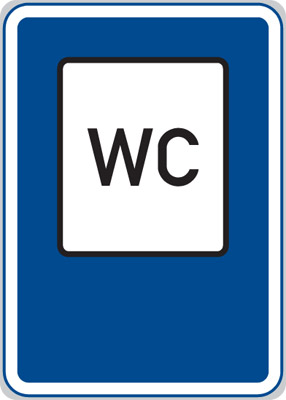
VI-15
Restroom

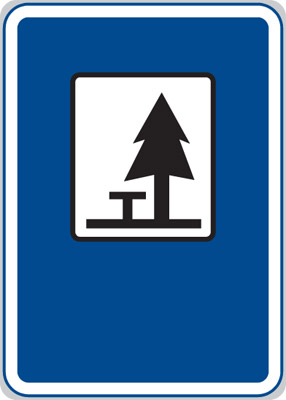
VI-16
Rest stop

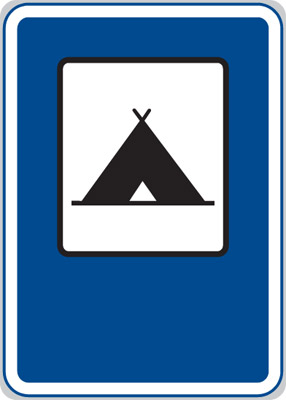
VI-18a
Camp site

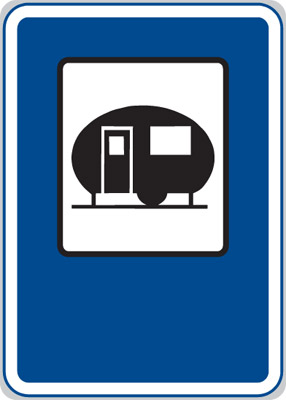
VI-18b
Caravan site

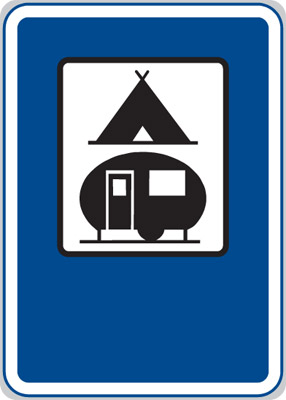
VI-18c
Caravan and camp site

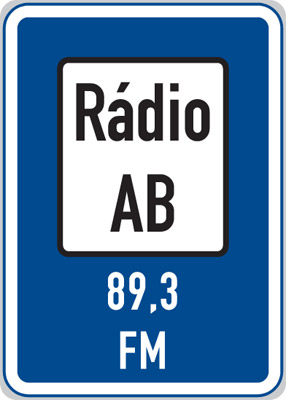
VI-19
Radio station

VI-25
Chapel

== Direction signs ==
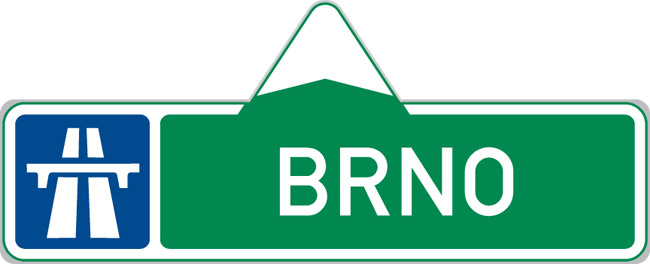
VII-1a Route indicator with direction via expressway-ring road (single destination) (old)

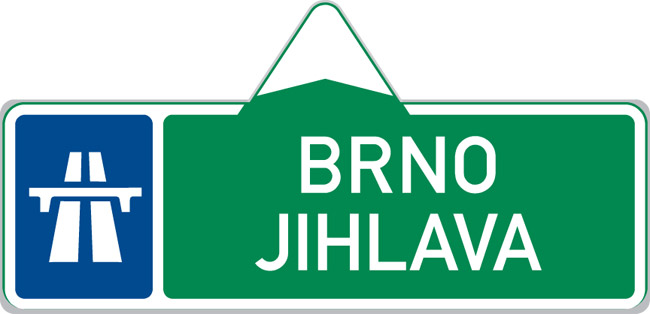
VII-1b Route indicator with direction via expressway-ring road (two destinations) (old)

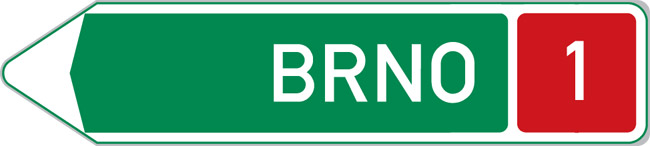
VII-1c Route indicator with direction via expressway (single destination) (old)

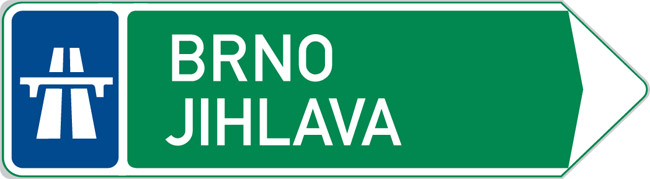
VII-1d Route indicator with direction via expressway (two destinations) (old)

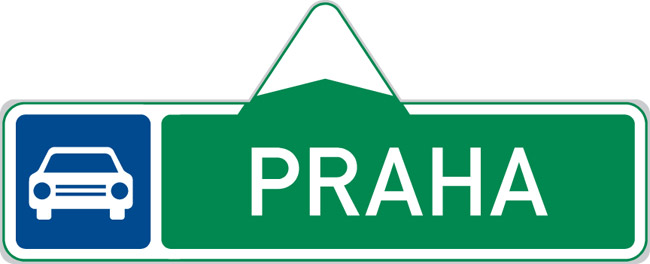
VII-2a Route indicator with direction via road for motor vehicles

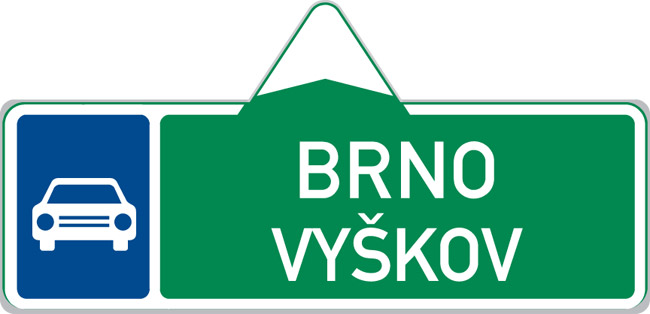
VII-2b Route indicator with direction via road for motor vehicles (two destination) (old)

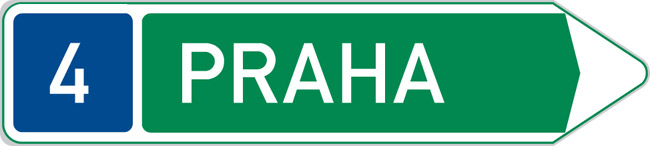
VII-2c Route indicator with direction via road for motor vehicles (single destination) (old)

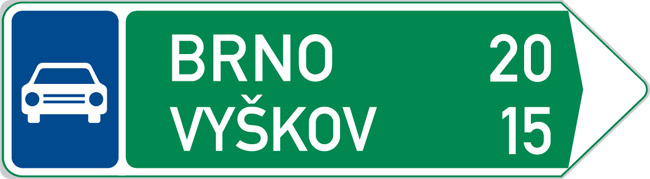
VII-2d Route indicator with direction via road for motor vehicles (two destinations) (old)

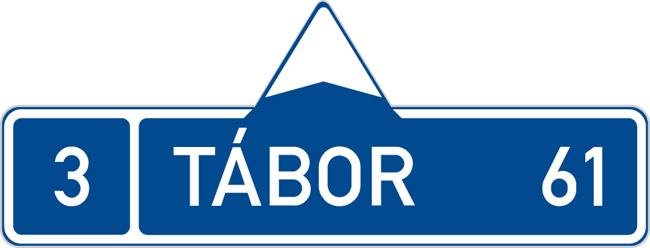
VII-3a Route indicator (single destination)

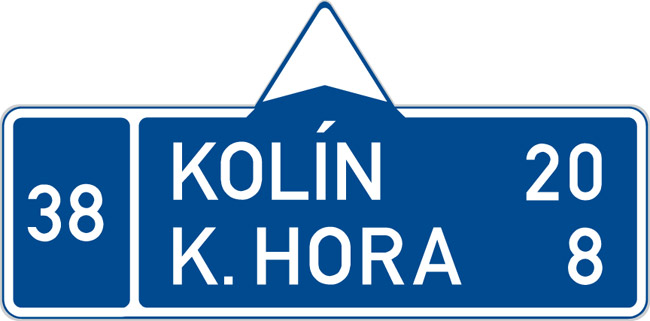
VII-3b Route indicator (two destinations)

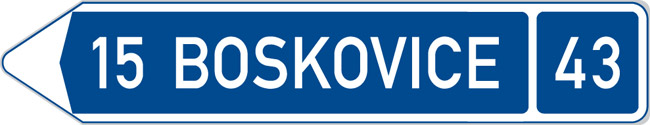
VII-3c Route indicator (single destination)

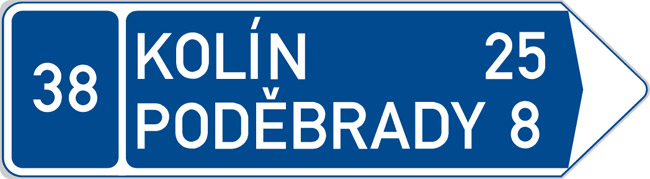
VII-3d Route indicator (two destinations)

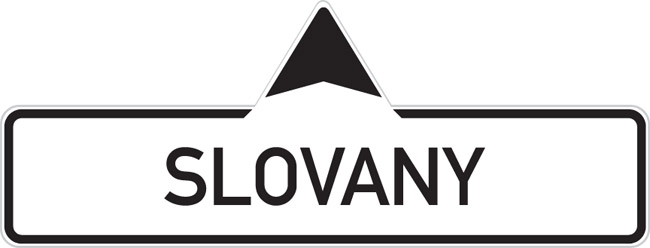
VII-4a Local route indicator (single destination)

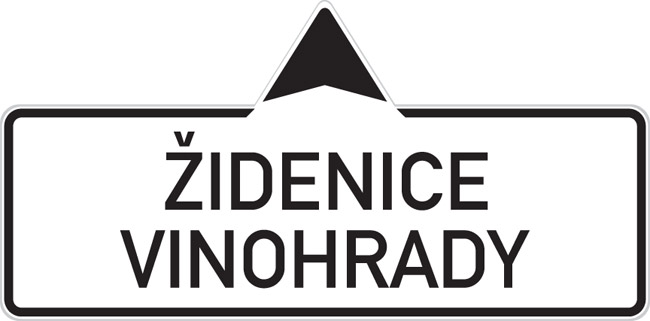
VII-4b Local route indicator (two destinations)

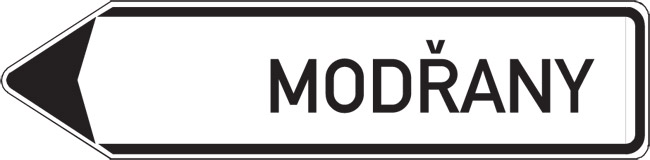
VII-4c Local route indicator (single destination)

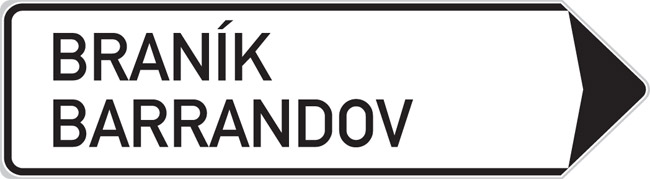
VII-4d Local route indicator (two destinations)

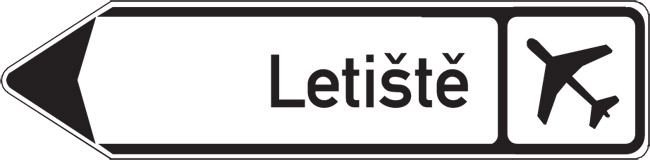
VII-5 Route indicator to specific destination (airport)

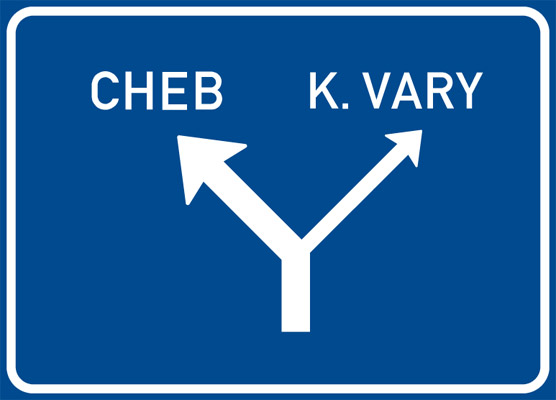
Advance sign for junction

Advance sign for roundabout

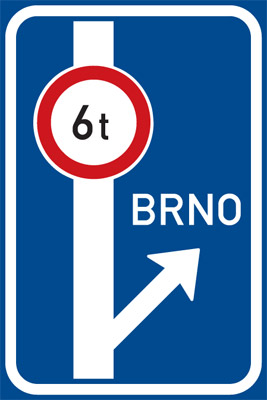
Advance sign for restriction

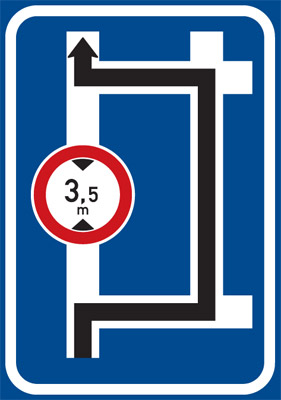
Route indicator avoiding restriction

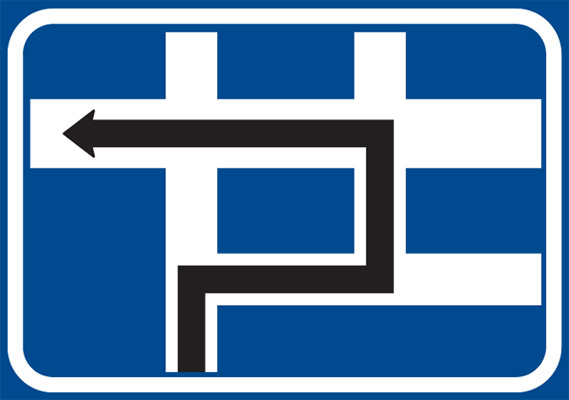
Route indicator avoiding restricted turn

Signboard – change of driving direction

Signboard – change of driving direction

Signboard – change direction

Signboard – change of driving direction with indicated restriction

Advance sign for route avoiding restriction

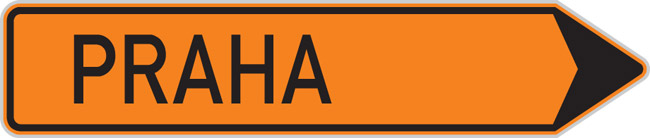
Diverted traffic for indicated destination

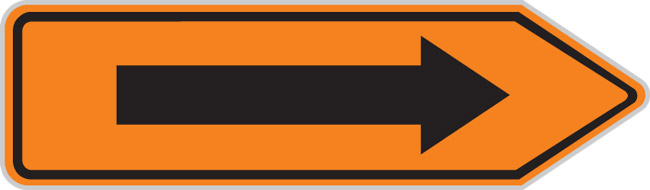
Diverted traffic

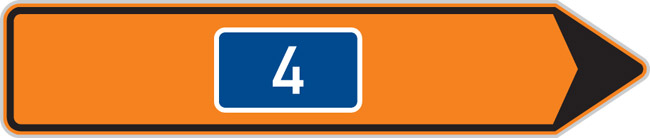
Diverted traffic for indicated route

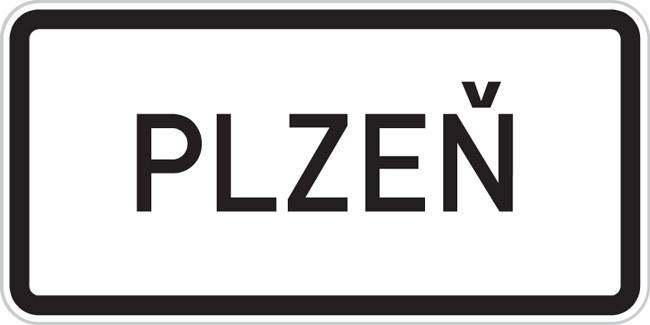
VII-24a
Community (speed limit 50 km/h implied)

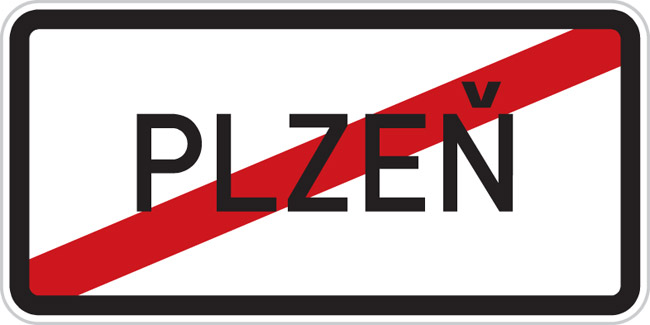
VII-25a
End of community (speed limit 90 km/h implied)

VII-24b
Built-up area

VII-25b
End of built-up area

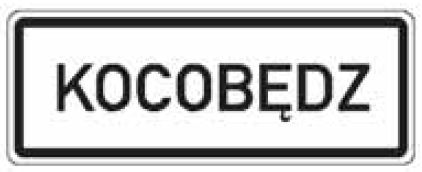
VII-24c
Community (in other language)

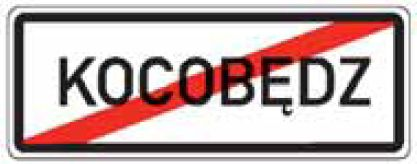
VII-25c
End of Community (in other language)

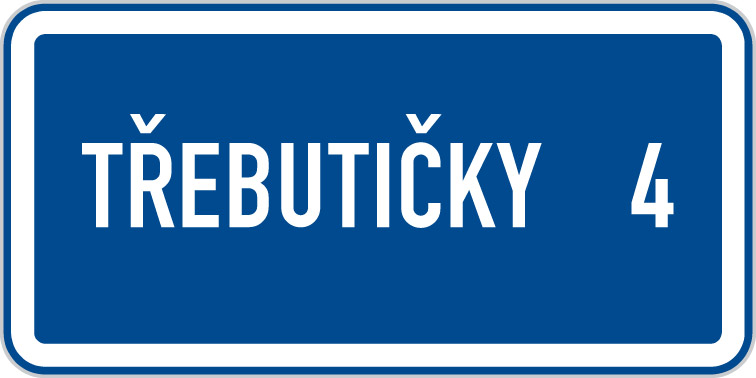
Route confirmation near destination

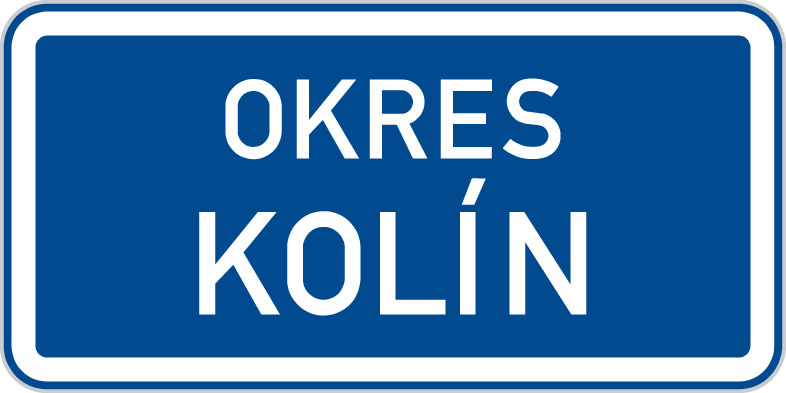
Regional border

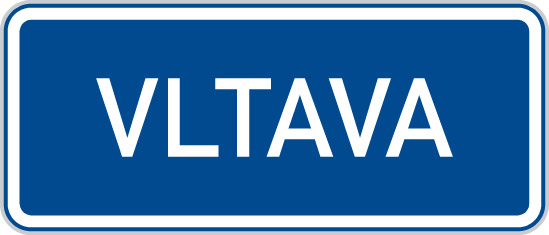
Worded sign (name of a river the road crosses)

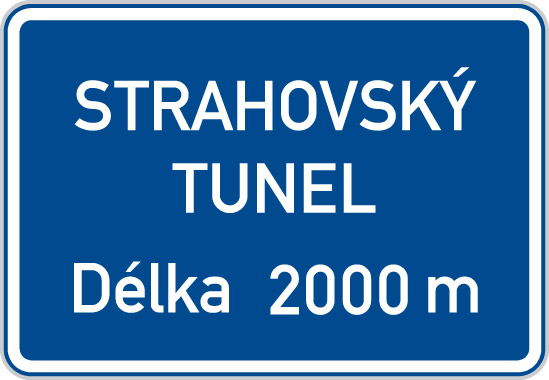
Worded sign (name of a tunnel, length 2000 m)

Highway (D5)

Highway (D46)

I class road (or expressway while marked)

I class road (or expressway while marked)

II class road

E-road indicator

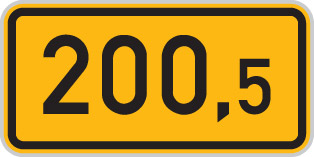
milestone ("kilometrestone")

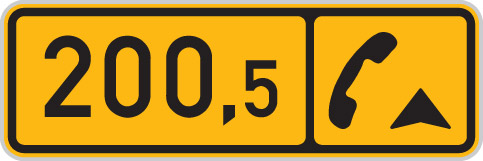
milestone ("kilometrestone"); nearest emergency phone ahead

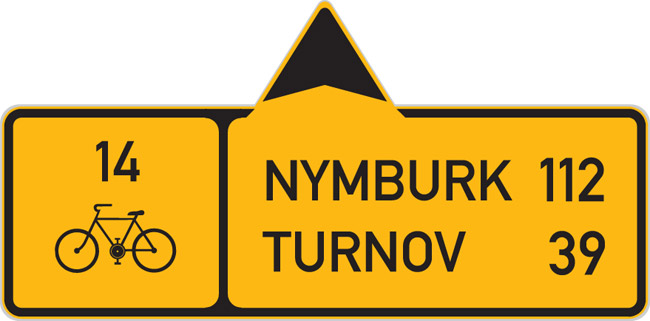
Route indicator for cycles (two destinations)

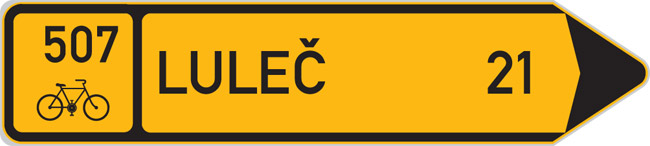
Route indicator for cycles (single destination)

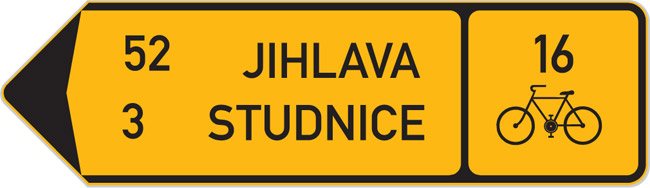
Route indicator for cycles (two destinations)

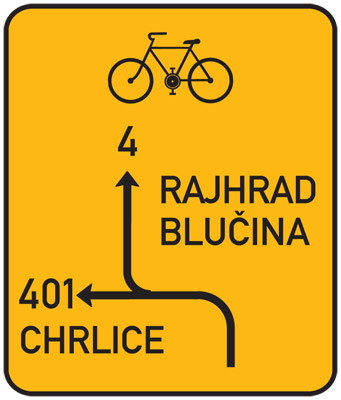
Advance sign for crossing for cycles

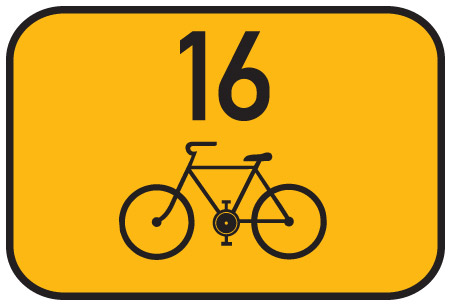
Cycle route (16)

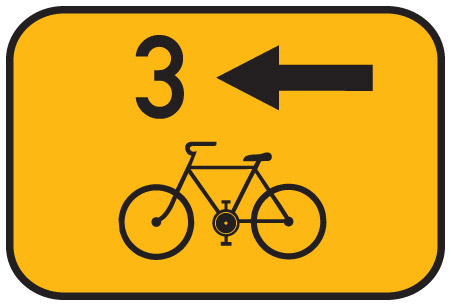
Cycle route (3)

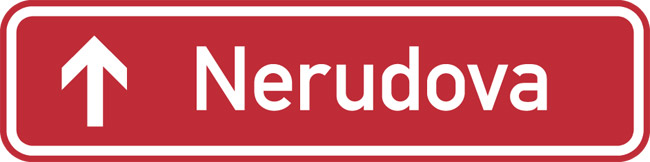
Street name

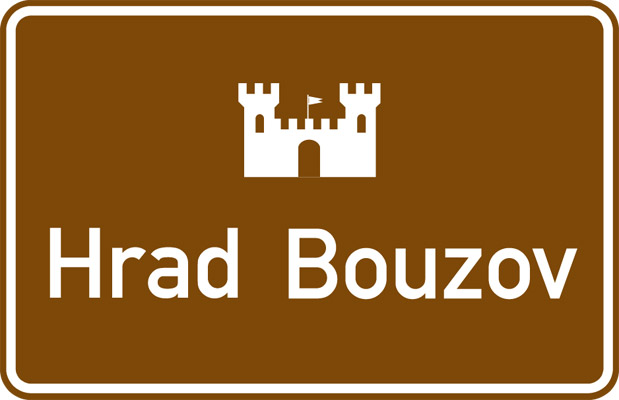
Cultural or tourist destination

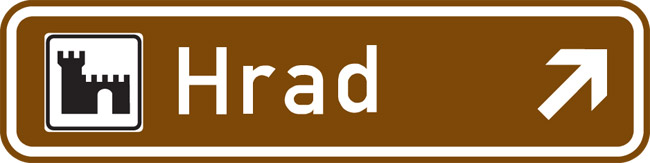
Direction to cultural or tourist destination

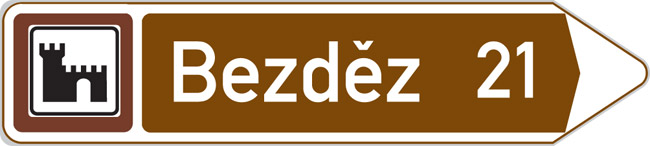
Distance and direction to cultural or tourist destination

== See also ==
- Road signs in Czechoslovakia
- Road signs in Slovakia
