= Bibliography of Misha Mahowald =

The following is a list of Misha Mahowald's scientific publications from 1989 onwards. Her name continued to appear on publications after her death in recognition of the strong contributions she had made to those works while still alive.

== 2000 ==
- R. Hahnloser, R. Sarpeshkar, M. Mahowald, R.J. Douglas and S. Seung: "Digital selection and analog amplification co-exist in an electronic circuit inspired by neocortex", Nature, 405: 947-951, 2000

== 1999 ==
- R.J. Douglas, C. Koch, M.A. Mahowald and K.A.C. Martin: "Recurrent excitation in neocortical circuits", Cerebral Cortex, Plenum Press, 1999
- R.J. Douglas, M.A. Mahowald and A.M. Whatley: "Strutture di Comunicazione Nei Sistemi Analogici Neuromorfi (Communications Infrastructure for Neuromorphic Analog Systems)", Frontiere della Vita, 3: 549-560, D.J. Amit and G. Parisi (Eds.), Enciclopedia Italiana, 1999
- R. Hahnloser, R. Douglas, M. Mahowald and K. Hepp: "Feedback interactions between neuronal pointers and maps for attentional processing", Nature Neuroscience, 2: 746–752, 1999
- P. Häfliger and M. Mahowald: "Weight vector normalization in an analog VLSI artificial neuron using a backpropagating action potential", Learning in Silicon, G. Cauwenbergh (Ed.), Kluwer Academic Publishers, 1999
- P. Häfliger and M. Mahowald: "Spike based normalizing hebbian learning in an analog VLSI artificial neuron", Analog Integrated Circuits and Signal Processing, 18:(2/3) 133-140, Feb 1999

== 1998 ==
- P. Häfliger and M. Mahowald: "Weight vector normalization in an analog VLSI artificial neuron using a backpropagating action potential", Neuromorphic Systems, Engineering Silicon from Neurobiology:16, 191-196, L.S. Smith and A.Hamilton (Eds.), World Scientific, 1998
- C. Rasche, R. Douglas and M. Mahowald, "Characterization of a Pyramidal Silicon Neuron", Neuromorphic Systems: Engineering Silicon from Neurobiology:14, 169-177, L.S. Smith and A. Hamilton (Eds.), World Scientific, 1998

== 1996 ==
- R. Douglas and M. Mahowald: "Design and fabrication of analog VLSI neurons", Methods in Neuronal Modelling: From Synapses to Networks, C. Koch and I. Segev (Eds.), MIT Press, 1996
- R.J. Douglas, M.A. Mahowald and K.A.C. Martin: "Microarchitecture of Neocortical Columns", Brain Theory - Biological Basis and Computational Principles, 75-95, A. Aertsen and V. Braitenberg (Eds.), Elsevier Science, 1996
- R.J. Douglas, M.A. Mahowald and K.A.C. Martin: "Neuroinformatics as explanatory neuroscience", Neuroimage, 4: 25-28, 1996
- R.J. Douglas, M.A. Mahowald, K.A.C. Martin and K.J. Stratford: "The role of synapses in cortical computation", Journal of Neurocytology, 25: 893-911, 1996
- P. Häfliger, M. Mahowald and L. Watts: "A spike based learning neuron in analog VLSI", Advances in Neural Information Processing Systems, 9: 692-698, 1996

== 1995 ==
- R. Douglas and M. Mahowald: "A Constructor set for Silicon Neurons", An Introduction to Neural and Electronic Networks:14 277-296, S.F. Zornetzer, J.L. Davis, C. Lau and T. McKenna (Eds.), Academic Press, 1995
- R. Douglas and M. Mahowald: "Silicon Neurons", The Handbook of Brain Theory and Neural Networks 282-289, M. Arbib (Ed.), MIT Press, 1995
- R. Douglas, M. Mahowald and C. Mead: "Neuromorphic Analog VLSI", Annual Review of Neuroscience, 18: 255-281, 1995
- R.J. Douglas, C. Koch, M. Mahowald, K.A.C. Martin and H.H. Suarez: "Recurrent Excitation in Neocortical Circuits", Science, 269: 981-985, 1995

== 1994 ==
- R.J. Douglas, M.A. Mahowald and K.A.C. Martin, "Hybrid analog-digital architectures for neuromorphic systems", Neural Networks, 1994 IEEE World Congress on Computational Intelligence, 3: 1848-1853, IEEE, 1994

== 1989 ==
- M. Mahowald and T. Delbrück: "Cooperative stereo matching using static and dynamic image features", Analog VLSI Implementation of Neural Systems, 213-238, C. Mead and M. Ismail (Eds.), Kluwer Academic Publishers, 1989.
