= Critical point =

Critical point may refer to:

- Critical phenomena in physics
- Critical point (mathematics), in calculus, a point where a function's derivative is either zero or nonexistent
- Critical point (set theory), an elementary embedding of a transitive class into another transitive class which is the smallest ordinal which is not mapped to itself
- Critical point (thermodynamics), a temperature and pressure of a material beyond which there is no longer any difference between the liquid and gas phases
- Quantum critical point
- Critical point (network science)
- Construction point, in skiing, a line that represents the steepest point on a hill

== See also ==
- Critical value (disambiguation)
- Critical path (disambiguation)
- Brillouin zone
- Percolation thresholds
