= Scooter-sharing system =

Service for short-term scooter rentals

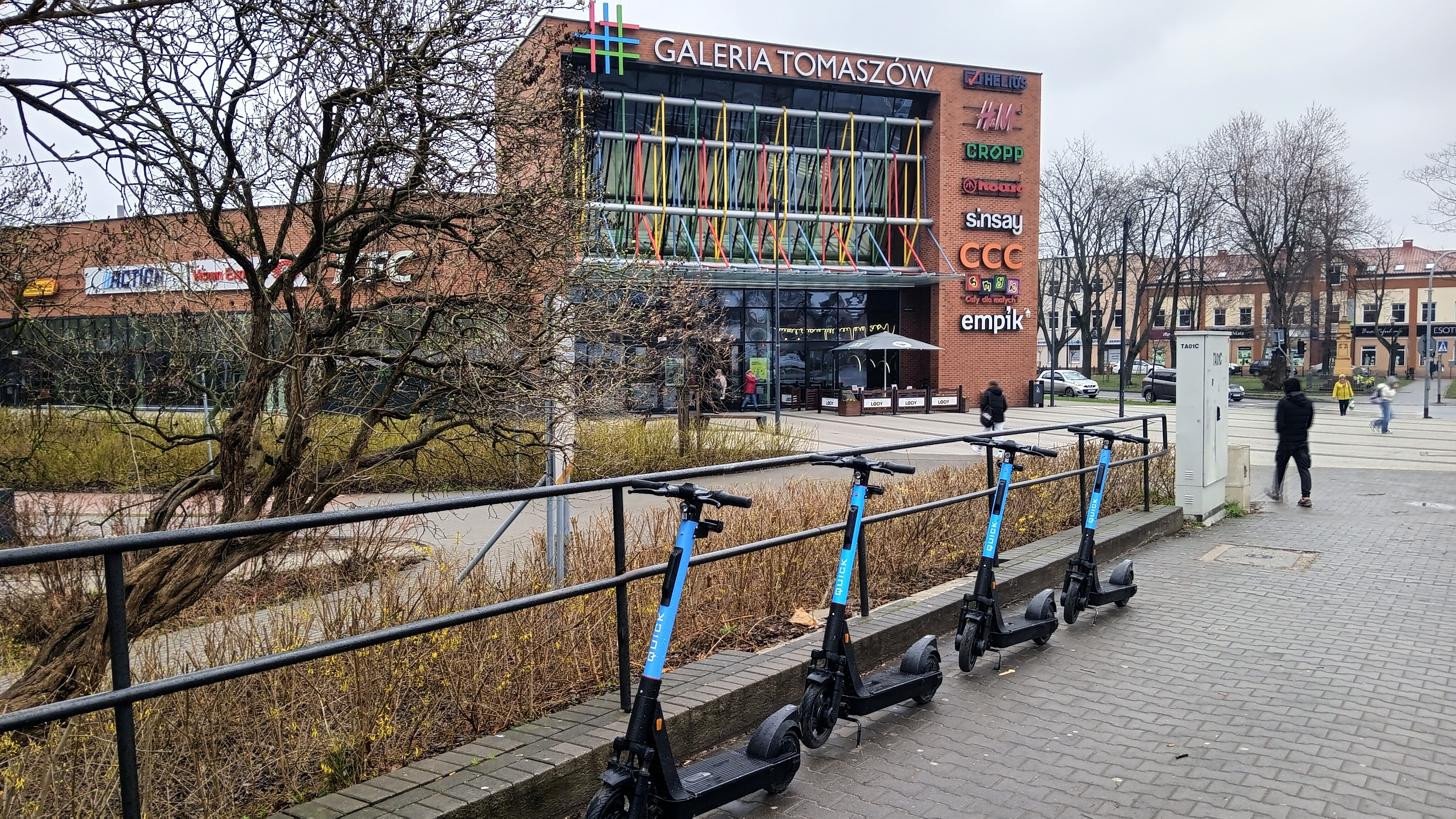
Parked electric scooters in Poland

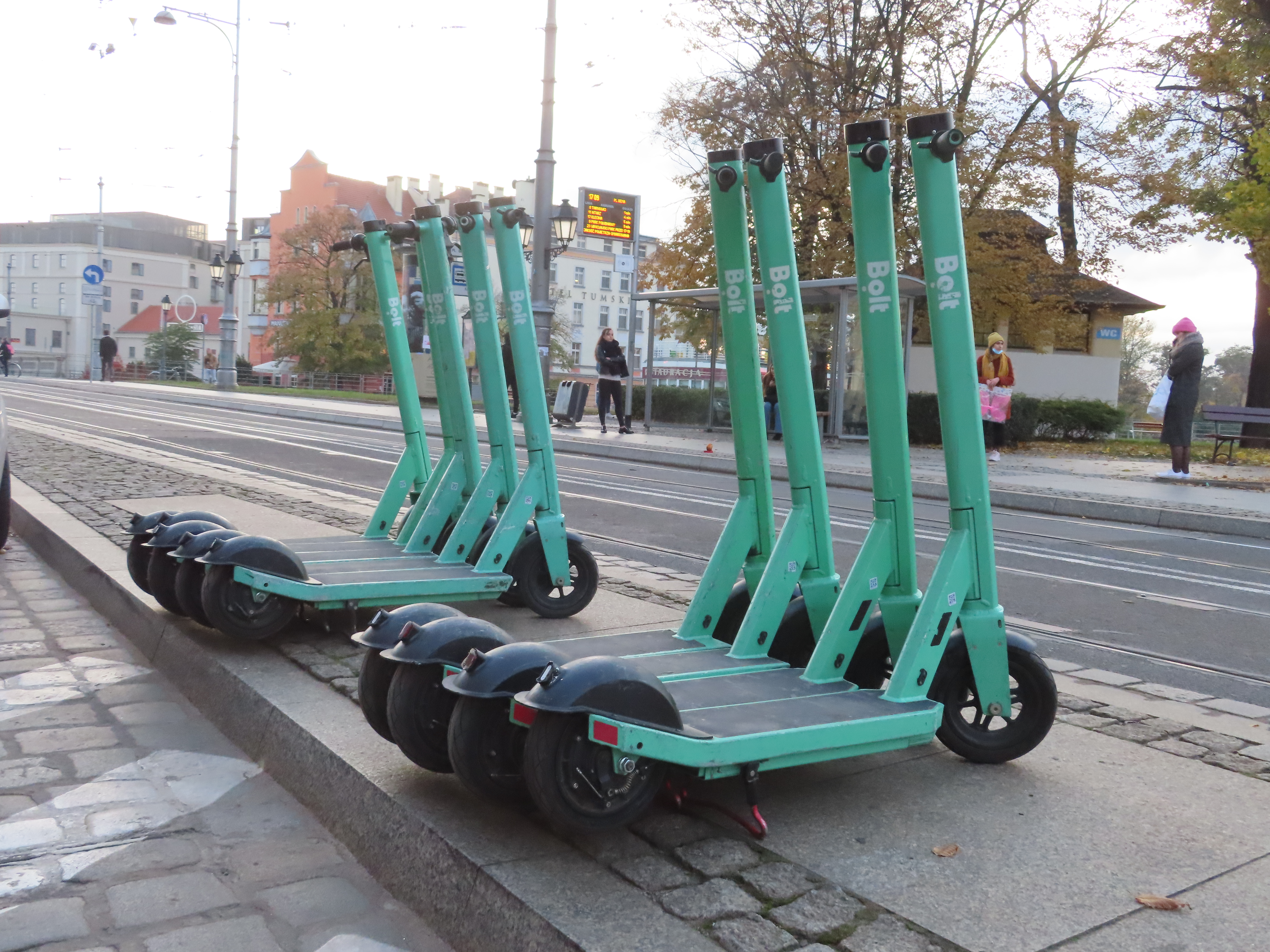
Bolt scooters parked at Bema Square, Wroclaw, 2021

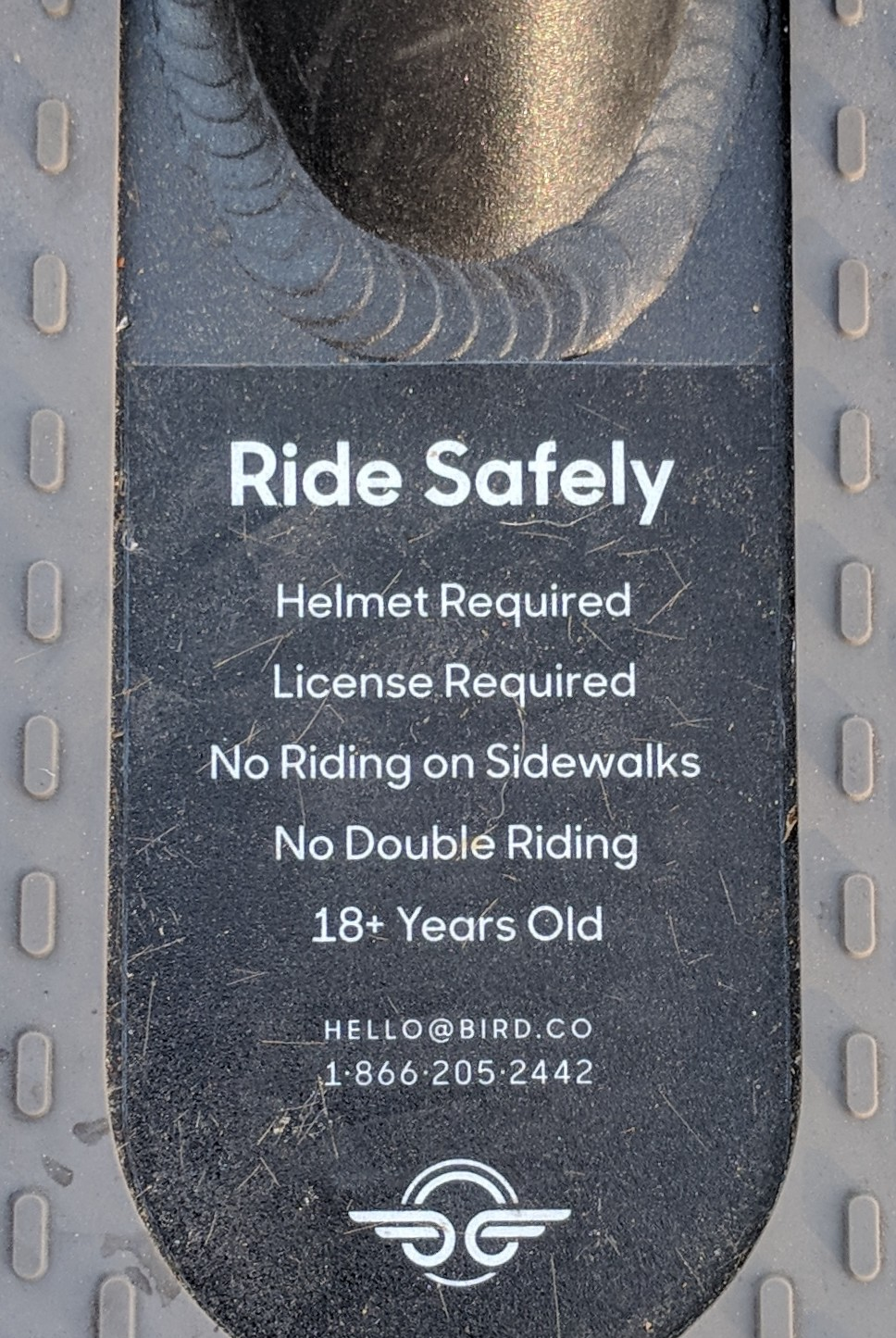
Rules printed on the deck of a Bird scooter

A scooter-sharing system or kicksharing system is a shared transport service in which e-scooters are made available to use for short-term rentals. E-scooters are typically "dockless," meaning that they do not have a fixed home location and are dropped off and picked up from certain locations in the service area.

Scooter-sharing systems work towards providing the public with a fast and convenient mode of transport for last-mile mobility in urban areas. Due to the growing popularity of scooter-sharing, municipal governments have enforced regulations on e-scooters to increase rider and pedestrian safety while avoiding the accrual of visual pollution. Scooter-sharing systems are one of the least expensive and most popular micromobility options. A similar concept is an electric bicycle sharing system. Some cities and companies operate both types of systems.

== Scooter-sharing industry ==
=== Rise of e-scooter industry ===
In 2012, Scoot Networks released a moped-style vehicle that provided a short-range rental of scooters. In 2016, Neuron Mobility introduced e-scooter docking stations in Singapore. In 2017, Bird Global and Lime introduced dockless electric kick scooters. Since its launch in Santa Monica, California, United States, Bird expanded its services to over 100 cities and reached a valuation of 2 billion dollars in 2018. In the same year, Lime amassed over 11.5 million rides. Early 2018 also saw India-based Yulu launching its IOT-enabled smart bicycles in Bengaluru, followed in 2019 by the launch of its shared electric vehicles. Lyft and Uber, the largest ride-sharing companies in the U.S., introduced their own electric scooter sharing services in 2018. In 2019, the global scooter market is expected to be valued at 300 billion to 500 billion dollars by 2030.

=== Technology ===
==== Apps ====
To rent a dockless e-scooter, users download a smartphone application. The application shows users a map of nearby e-scooters and enables them to unlock them. The application also includes a secure payment gateway such as PayPal. Scooters are equipped with built-in GPS chips and cellular connectivity which allows them to report their location in real time during a trip. Through GPS and cellular tracking, companies can gather usage statistics, track which scooters are being used, and charge customers accordingly for the time spent per trip.

==== Anti-theft ====
E-scooters have built-in features to prevent theft and hacking. Hackers are capable of replacing the existing hardware to convert the scooter for personal use, sometimes illegally. Users are only able to unlock and ride e-scooters by using a smartphone application; when a user has completed a trip, they use the app to lock the e-scooter and immobilize the wheels. Bird and Lime e-scooters have built-in alarms that will trigger if someone attempts to move or tamper with an e-scooter without using the app to unlock it. In response to the growing problem of scooter hacking, Lime claims it has developed custom scooter hardware that cannot be easily replaced with third-party parts.

=== International expansion ===
==== Asia ====
The market for the Asian scooter-sharing industry is currently less than 4 percent of the North American market size. Singaporean ride-sharing startups, Grab and Neuron Mobility, were the first movers in the Southeast-Asian e-scooter sector. Grab is valued at 10 billion dollars and currently only provides e-scooters from a singular location in Singapore. In 2018, Uber secured 27.5 percent of Grab's equity to compete in the Southeast-Asian market. Neuron Mobility owns and operates the most expansive collection of e-scooters in Thailand and Singapore. Lime has selected Singapore as the headquarters for its operations in Asia and was the first foreign company permitted to provide e-scooters within the city. Starting in 2019, Bird and Lime have been working alongside Japanese traffic regulators and testing local markets to assess the viability of an expansion to Japan. In 2022, Beam, a Singaporean startup which currently operates e-scooters and e-bikes in 35 cities raised $135 million of funding to expand.

==== Europe ====
Estonian mobility technology company Bolt launched scooter-sharing services on its mobile app platform in 2019. It has since become the largest micromobility operator in Europe, with operations in more than 130 cities across 20 countries. At the end of 2021, Bolt become the first company to launch scooter charging docks in Europe. In April 2022, Bolt announced plans to invest 150 million euros to further expand its scooter offering, pledging to operate 230,000 scooters across Europe by the end of the year.

Lime launched the first large-scale European expansion of scooter-sharing systems in Paris during June 2018. By October 2018, Lime's app became the top-ranked travel application on Apple's App Store in France. As of 2019, Lime provides scooter-sharing systems to more than 50 European cities including Paris, Berlin, London, Rome, Madrid, and Athens. Bird launched its own European market-development strategy in Paris in August 2018. Bird's coverage has expanded to more than 20 major European municipalities. Uber's Jump entered the European market in April 2019 through a test-launch in Madrid, Spain. Within a 7-month window, expanded the accessibility of their service from Madrid to 10 of Europe's most populated urban centers. European e-scooter start-ups, Voi Technology from Sweden and Tier Mobility out of Germany, accrued 80 million dollars and 28 million dollars of funding respectively. In 2020, Tier subsequently raised a further 250 million dollars, valuing the company at just under 1 billion dollars.

Since 2017 Amsterdam-based Felyx is active in the Netherlands and since 2019 in Brussels. From 2017 to 2018 the number of shared e-scooters in Europe increased by nearly 200 percent. The European demand for scooter-sharing systems is expected to grow 26.2 percent annually through 2025.

Since 2019, Turkey-based micro mobility platform, Scootable, provide services in 3 country and with more than 1500 scooters. In addition to scooters, the company also provides software infrastructure for many electric vehicles such as forklifts, street sweepers, cargo E-bikes, golf cart, scissor lifts, farm buggy, electric boats, baggage towing tractor.

Since 2018, kicksharing has appeared in Moscow, Russia. Currently available 42,000 scooters in 5 rental services. Scooters must be parked in special places. There are speed-restricted zones in the city - scooters automatically reduce speed to 5–15 km/h.

==== South America ====
Until 2019, Brazilian startup, Yellow was the largest e-scooter service in South America. The startup set the South American record for an initial fundraising round at 63 million dollars of investment. At the start of 2019, Yellow carried out a merger with the Mexican e-scooter service Grin to form the conglomerate Grow Mobility. Grow Mobility is the largest scooter-sharing service in South America with 100,000 e-scooters and plans to double this coverage by the end of 2019. Other competitors in the South American market include Colombian e-scooter start-up Cosmic Go, worldwide scooter rental company BikesBooking from Barcelona, and the multinational mobility service Movo headquartered in Spain.

== Effects ==
=== Right-of-way obstruction and visual pollution ===
Visual pollution is a major concern caused by scooter-sharing in cities due to users illegally parking e-scooters on sidewalks, entryways, roads, and access points. E-scooters that are incorrectly parked litter sidewalks and block pedestrian walkways. Riding e-scooters on the sidewalk is discouraged because it disturbs pedestrians and poses a safety risk at high speeds. The term "scooter rage" or "scooter war" describes a movement by displeased city residents to illegally dump e-scooters into waterways or bury them so that users are unable to find and rent them.

=== Injuries, fatalities and safety ===
There is limited information on the overall scale of injuries caused by electric scooters. However, in a three-month study, 20 people were injured for every 100,000 rides. A close majority were head injuries, and of those cases, 15 percent were traumatic. Broken bones; ligament, tendon, or nerve impairments, severe bleeding; and organ damage are other injuries experienced by electric scooter riders. Non-riders have also been a victim to electronic scooter injuries through collisions or tripping on the devices in the streets. In the United States, 11 fatalities occurred between the start of 2018 to mid-2019.

Common times of accidents occur during work and rush hours. 33 percent of all injuries occur on sidewalks and 55 percent occur on streets. Several accidents involved cars and obstacles on the ground, like curbs, poles, or manhole covers. Mechanical problems, such as failing brakes and wheels, and distracted riders were other contributing factors for accidents. Sixty percent of injured people reported to have reviewed the training created by the electric scooter companies before riding.

Only 4 percent of injured riders are reported to have worn helmets. Lime and Bird are redesigning the devices with sturdier brakes to help reduce the mechanical troubles of riding the scooters. The companies have also been working alongside cities to develop infrastructure, like bike lanes that will be safer for people to travel.

=== Last-mile problem and micromobility ===
The last-mile problem is a public transportation dilemma regarding the difficulty of moving passengers from private residences to mass-transit centers i.e. bus stops, train stations, etc. This spatial inefficiency forces passengers to use personal transportation (i.e. cars, motorcycles, etc.) in order to commute the short distance between transportation hubs and their homes. The last-mile problem reduces the intended benefits of public transportation: reduced carbon emissions, reduced traffic congestion, and increased convenience. Micro-mobility options, provide a solution to the last-mile problem and are characterized as light-weight, communal, and designed for short-distance travel. Scooter-sharing systems are one of the most heavily adopted micromobility services. The ease of accessibility and intuitive usability of scooter-sharing systems increases the adoption of public transportation and reduces the usage of personal vehicles. Citizens may incur alternative feedback benefits such as increased access to job opportunities, reduced traffic congestion, and reduced air and noise pollution.

=== Traffic ===
Traffic congestion is amplified by the increased usage of personal-automobile transportation as a means of overcoming the last-mile problem. 46 percent of all vehicle congestion in the United States can be attributed to drivers making trips within a three-mile radius, and over 60 percent of car trips fell within the micro-mobility range, 0–5 miles. E-Scooters provide a means of subverting congestion and output higher speeds than the 9 mile per hour average of automobile traffic within many major urban hubs. At the individual level, the reduction of commute time is associated with an increase in economic mobility and advancement. In the United States alone, an estimated 87 billion dollars were lost to time spent waiting in traffic. Micromobility Investor Oliver Bruce has asserted that 4 trillion miles of automobile travel globally can realistically be replaced with scooter-sharing and other micro-mobility alternatives. As more drivers transition towards the adoption of scooter-sharing systems, personal-automobile traffic is reduced.

=== Sustainability ===
E-scooters are powered by electricity and therefore have zero direct carbon emissions. The reduced carbon impact between personal automobiles and e-scooters has been a central tenet in the value propositions of market-leaders Bird and Lime, though these propositions have been called into question, with research finding most of the time scooter riders would have otherwise walked, biked, or taken public transportation. E-scooters and ebikes are more energy-efficient than alternative electric vehicle options; the same amount of energy will propel a scooter twenty times farther than an electric automobile. The ridership of e-scooters yields a neutral primary carbon footprint, but the production, distribution, and charging of e-scooters create a significant secondary carbon footprint. In comparison to personal-automobiles and dockless e-bikes, dockless e-scooters have a smaller aggregate carbon footprint. Buses, bicycles, and personal electric bipedal vehicles maintain smaller carbon footprints than dockless e-scooters. Some e-scooter renting companies say they are seeking for ways to reduce some part of their secondary carbon footprint.

A life cycle assessment of e-scooter sharing systems performed by researchers at North Carolina State University calls claims of sustainability benefits of the programs into question, finding that nearly two thirds of the time people use shared e-scooters, they are creating more CO_{2} emission than they would have if scooter share was not an option.

=== Privacy concerns ===
Scooter-sharing companies collect GPS and cellular-based data on customer rides; this data helps companies and cities plan for the building of new bike lanes and enforce program rules such as parking and allowed service area. Cities require companies to share data that contains the precise details of when and where e-scooters are used.

In November 2019, the Los Angeles Department of Transportation (LADOT), in California, United States, temporarily suspended Uber subsidiary Jump's permit to rent e-scooters and bikes following Uber's failure to transmit real-time data detailing the start point, endpoint, and travel time on all rides as a part of the city's one-year pilot permit program. Uber, backed by several data privacy organizations, argues that the city's policy "constitutes government surveillance" and that little analysis is required to generate a precise log of an individual's movements. LADOT said that the data is necessary to monitor which scooter-sharing companies are complying with the permit program's rules such as the number of scooters deployed and operation of scooters in prohibited areas.

LADOT does not collect specific data about users beyond trip details, but precise mobility data may contain personally identifiable information. In a 2013 study, researchers studied location information from cell towers for 1.5 million individuals and were able to uniquely identify the mobility traces of 95 percent of individuals by using four data points.

== Response and regulations ==
Several United States cities have introduced regulations on e-scooters and scooter-sharing companies to address safety concerns and the illegal dumping of e-scooters. In May 2018, shortly after the initial launch of e-scooters in San Francisco, the city issued a cease and desist order to Bird, Spin, and Lime after receiving about 1,900 complaints from residents regarding sidewalk congestion due to the illegal parking of e-scooters. As of June 2018, prospective scooter-sharing companies are required by the SFMTA to submit a business plan regarding safety concerns and sidewalk clutter to receive a permit to rent and own e-scooters. In August 2018, San Francisco awarded permits to Scoot Networks and Skip, allowing each company to launch 625 e-scooters to jumpstart a year-long pilot program.

In August 2019, the Nashville Metro Council in Tennessee, United States, voted against a ban on e-scooters in the city. All seven scooter-sharing companies in the city will continue to operate until a selection process to allow a maximum of three companies to continue operations is finalized. In the meantime, councilmembers approved legislation in July to cut existing scooter fleets in half, restrict hours of operation, and introduce no-ride and safe zones.

Washington D.C.’s district council has proposed legislation to establish rules to define where e-scooters can be parked, enforce speed limits, and restrict hours of operation.

In September 2019, France banned the riding of e-scooters on sidewalks following an increase in accidents and sidewalk congestion; users who violate the ban will be fined 135 euros. Singapore also banned e-scooters on sidewalks as of November 2019 after a rise in accidents including at least one fatality. Violators will face a fine of 2000 Singapore dollars and/or up-to three months in jail.

In response to backlash from city regulators and lawmakers, scooter-sharing companies have launched initiatives that include charity, outreach to low-income communities, and infrastructure improvements. Lime introduced a donation module on its app called Lime Hero so that customers can opt in to donate a portion of their ride fare to a nonprofit organization. Lime also introduced Lime Access which grants qualifying low-income users a 50 percent discount to ride on its e-scooters and bikes. Similarly, Bird waived its one dollar base ride fee for qualifying customers, who are only required to pay a 15 cent-per-mile fee. In addition, Bird is setting aside one dollar per day per scooter to help cities build and maintain bike lanes.

Some citizens of Paris have raised concerns against scooter driving. These concerns include riders not wearing helmets, driving up to 27 km/h, and that riders as young as 12 could legally hire the e-scooters.

In 2023, Paris Mayor Anne Hidalgo called for a referendum on rental e-scooters. This referendum, which seeks to ban battery-powered rental e-scooters has amassed 91,300 votes or 90% of the 103,000 voters. With 1.38 million eligible voters recorded in the city's electoral register, the total voter turnout was less than eight percent.

== Employment ==
=== Electric chargers ===
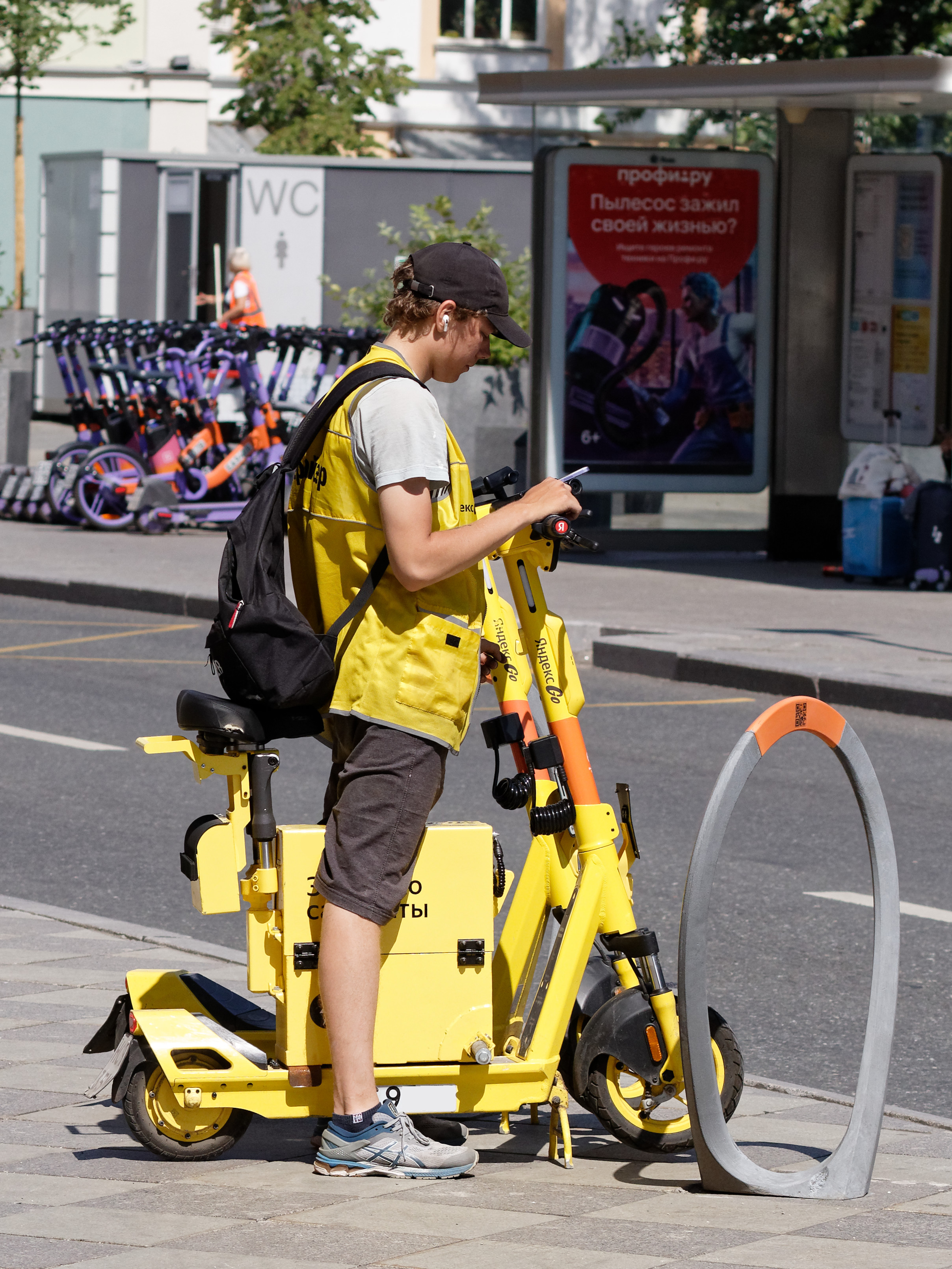
Yandex.Go (a mobility service and app from Yandex) battery charging attendant at Pyatnitskaya Street, Moscow, Russia.

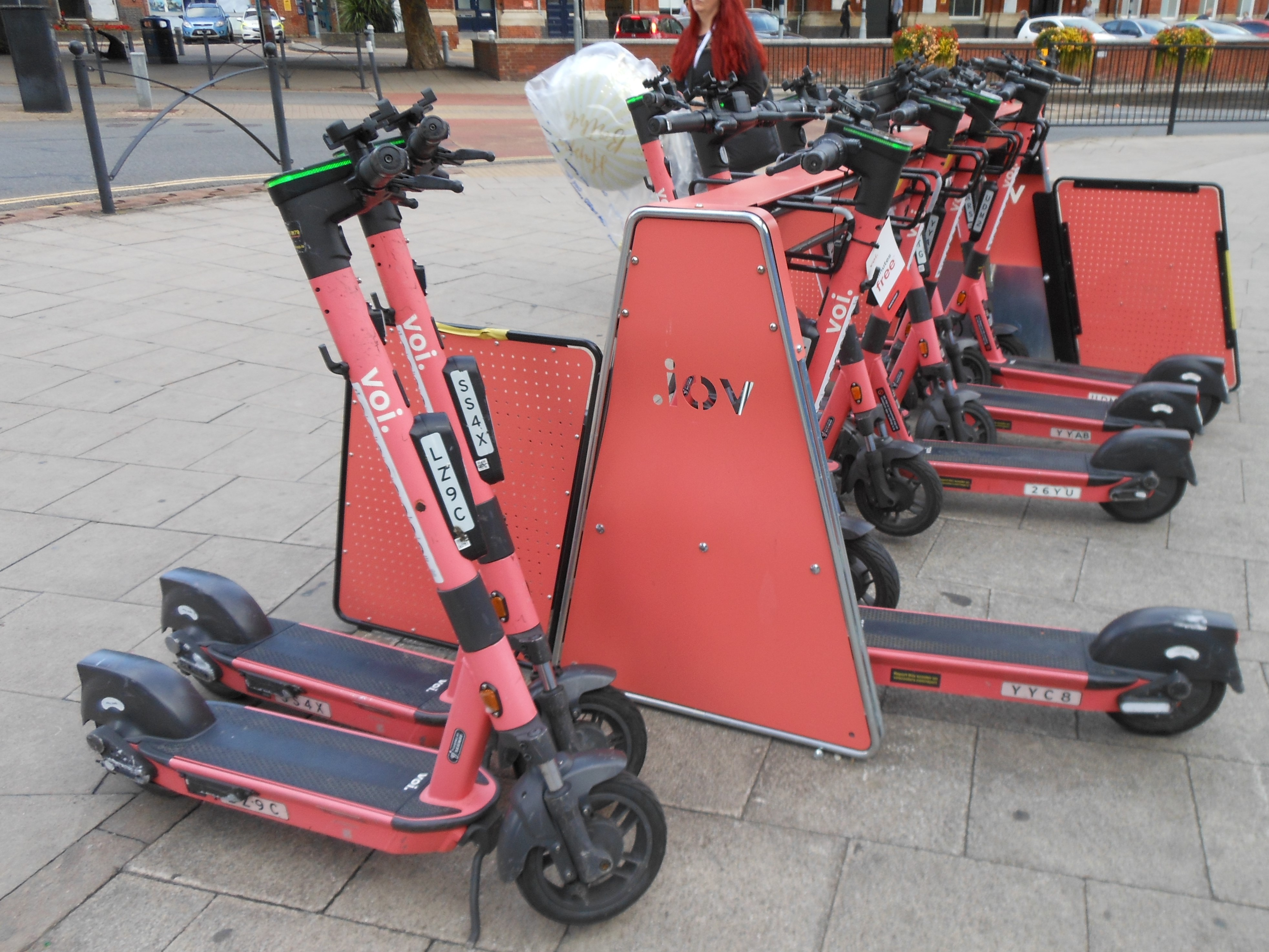
VOI parking and charging spot in Portsmouth, United Kingdom

The scooter-sharing system introduced charging jobs that compensate people to find and charge scooters. Bird can approve workers after receiving personal, tax, and bank-account information. The process does not require a background check and attracts students and young professionals who want a flexible way to earn extra money. Companies even offer additional bonuses for missing or hard to find scooters; however, the incentives have backfired because some chargers intentionally hide the device to reap the extra cash. Earnings depend on the device's charge and location, but often range from 5 dollars to 20 dollars. Typically, scooters need half of a kilowatt-hour of electricity which costs about 5 cents. Competition over collecting scooters escalated to criminal acts including impersonating company officials to retrieve hoarded scooters and stealing account information through Facebook groups.

=== Mechanics ===
To sustain the condition of scooters, Bird hires three level of mechanics, L1, L2, and L3, to repair devices. The most rudimentary level, L1 focuses on minor repairs of brakes, tires, and throttles. The amount of compensation depends on the extent of damage and generally ranges from 5 to 20 dollars.

== Developments and innovations ==
=== Usability ===
Jump has invested in improving the durability and safety of e-scooters by increasing the size of the vehicle and adding more-effective handbrakes. Bird has increased its vehicle size by up to 55 percent to make e-scooters last longer. Lime has doubled the duration of its scooters' usable life through their own design changes. Third-party software companies such as Maas have sought to ease access to e-scooters by developing mapping programs that compile adjacent micro-mobility options from multiple providers.

=== Compliance ===
In 2018, Skip debuted the first dockless e-scooters attached with cameras taking periodic snapshots to monitor riding patterns, ensure that patrons are not riding on sidewalks, and confirm that vehicles are properly parked. Skip released a second scooter in 2018 featuring a locking mechanism to reduce theft and encourage riders to use designated parking areas. Working alongside municipalities since 2018, Bird has developed a, 'GovTech,' program that gives city governments visibility into Bird's usage data such as localized ridership or congestion. Bird has also instituted geo-fences and geo-speed limits that limit the functionality of the scooters within prohibited spatial boundaries. Bird has publicly advocated and provided funding for city governments to increase the number of bike lanes and improve upon the safety of existing routes.

=== Gender gap ===
A large-scale questionnaire survey conducted by Portland State University demonstrated the gender gap in e-scooter usage: 64% identified as a man, 34% as a woman, and 2% as transgender or non-binary. A big social data based study led by University of Washington also reported similar gender gap with 34.86% identified as female and 65.14% as male.

=== Conservancy ===
Partnering with French green-energy provider, Planète Oui, has allowed Lime to convert the entirety of its charging infrastructure to be powered by renewable energy. All non-battery materials in Lime's e-scooters are completely recycled for future production. Both Bird and Lime have invested in carbon offset projects to mitigate the carbon impact of transportation and distributing e-scooters. Jump and Skip have sought to reduce their secondary carbon footprint by introducing swappable batteries for e-scooters; swappable batteries minimize the role of sub-contracted chargers that collect scooters using carbon-emitting vehicles.

== See also ==
- Micromobility
- Bicycle-sharing system
