= BeRider =

Shared electric scooter company

BeRider s.r.o.
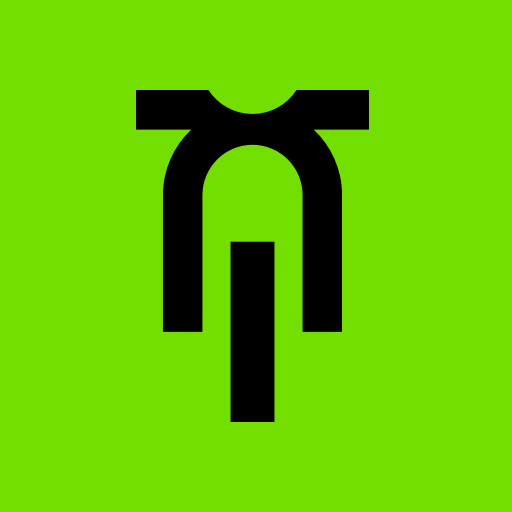

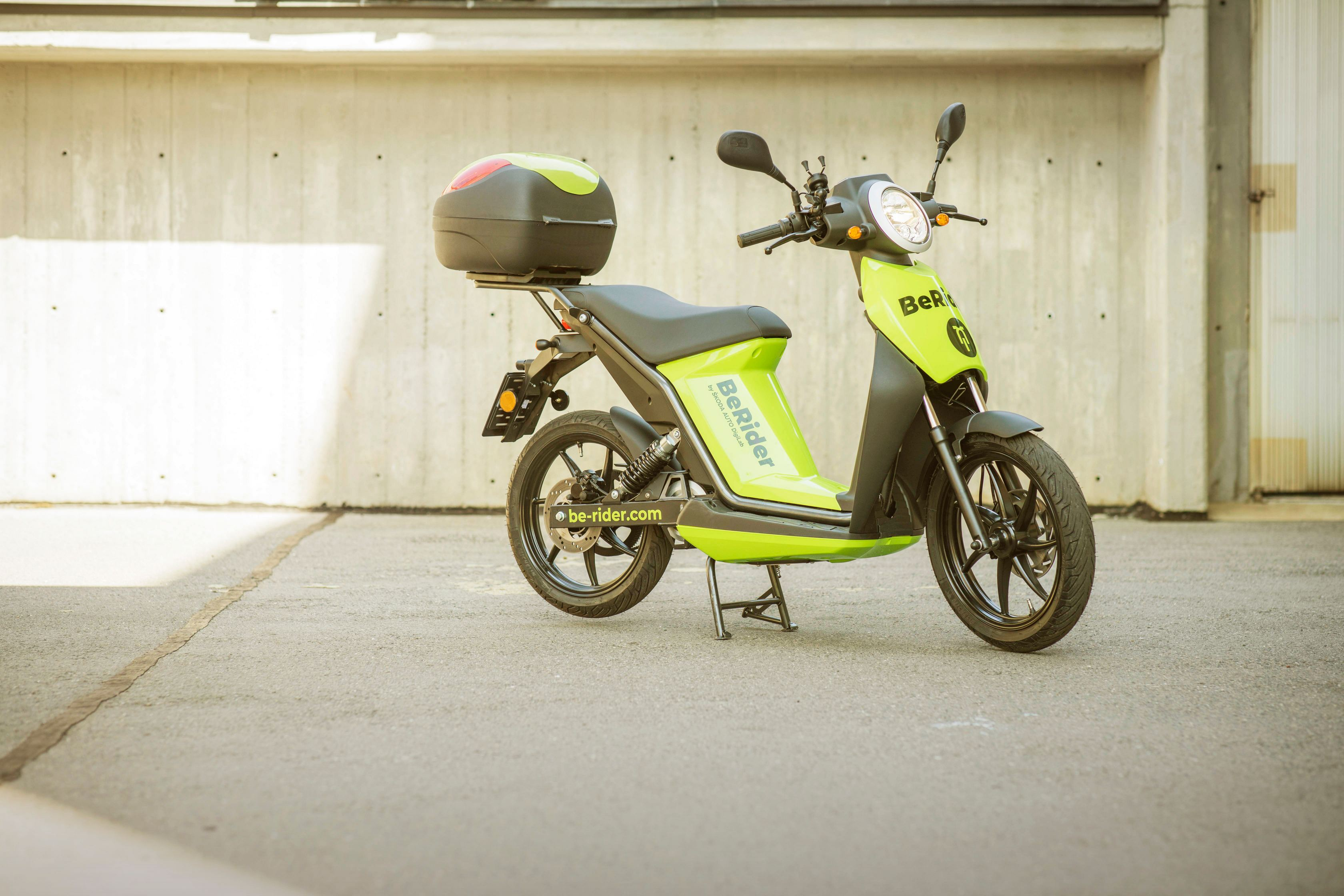
- BeRider Electric scooter
- Industry: Scooter sharing, Electromobility, Micromobility
- Founded: September 3, 2019; 6 years ago in Prague, Czech Republic
- Defunct: 2023
- Headquarters: Prague, Czech republic
- Website: be-rider.com

BeRider was a provider of shared electric scooters in the capital city of Prague, Czech Republic. The service was launched on September 3, 2019 and closed in 2023.

The electromobility project came from Škoda Auto DigiLab. The service was intended for users aged 18 and over who hold a driving license of category A, A1, A2, or B. BeRider scooters were located throughout the city within the BeRider zone. Users could register and then reserve, unlock and rent them via the BeRider app.

== History ==
BeRider was launched on September 3, 2019. The project was preceded by analysis to identify how scooter sharing should work properly in Prague. Škoda Auto DigiLab worked to find eco-friendly solutions in the field of micromobility and project BeRider was able to deliver a smart mobility solution.

The pilot phase of the project ended on December 16, 2019. During the first three months of operation of 150 electric scooters, more than 23,000 reservations were made. The pilot was deemed a success and the Board of Directors of Škoda Auto decided to continue the project.

In early 2020, the COVID-19 pandemic began in the Czech Republic. BeRider offered its electric scooters to health care professionals in April, free of charge. More than 300 doctors, nurses, and other medical staff took advantage of this offer. All other users were also able to ride for free for a week at the end of April 2020.

In June 2020, BeRider introduced a new application to simplify the use of the service. In the same month, BeRider organized its first scooter school under the guidance of a professional instructor in order to prepare users for safe driving in urban traffic.

In August 2020, BeRider launched a new service – a mountain bike rental called BeRider Bikes offering classic and electric bikes for adults and children along with accessories such as helmets, gloves, etc.

In 2023, the company ceased operations, citing inability to expand the project.

=== Impact ===
In 2017, there were 350,000 users of shared scooters worldwide and by 2019, this number had increased to 5,000,000. This increasing demand was also reflected in the Czech market and BeRider thus expanded its fleet in August 2020. Due to the increasing popularity, BeRider was also able to maintain its service over the winter period.

In 2023, the year of BeRider's closure, the company published its ridership statistics. According to the company's data, the BeRider users overall rode 4,200,000 kilometres (2,600,000 mi), thus saving up to 512 tons of CO_{2}.

== Usage ==
The use of BeRider electric scooters was subject to age of majority, the possession of a driving license of category A, A1, A2, or B, and the ownership of a smartphone with the BeRider app downloaded. To register for an account, users had to provide their contact details, photos of their ID and driving license, and payment card details. After their account was approved, which could take up to 24 hours, the user was given 15 free minutes and could start riding.

A map in the app provided the precise locations for each individual scooter. A user could unlock an available scooter by pressing a button in the app, before being able to access the tailbox which provided helmets in two sizes.

The ride could be finished only in the BeRider zone which was marked with gray in the user application. If the user wanted to stop outside of the zone, they had the option to pause the ride. After parking, the user returned the helmet to the tailbox, put the scooter back on the stand, and finished the ride in the app.

The first minute of every ride was free. Each additional minute cost 5 CZK in the regular fare cost. The user had an option to purchase a discounted package of prepaid minutes in the app, which reduced the price to 2.9 CZK per minute. After the ride was completed, the price was deducted from the user's payment card or the minutes were deducted from the prepaid package.

== Technical parameters ==
Brand	Torrot
Model	Muvi
Motor	Electric
Power	3 kW
Max. speed	66 km/h
Range	70 km
Weight with battery	93 kg
Max. load	150 kg
Seats	2
Helmets	2 (Size M and L)
Wheels	16”
Brakes	CBS (Combined braking system)
Sources	
