= Misha Mahowald =

American computational neuroscientist

- Born: Michelle Anne Mahowald; January 12, 1963; Minneapolis, Minnesota
- Died: December 26, 1996 (aged 33); Zürich, Switzerland
- Education: California Institute of Technology (BS, PhD)
- Scientific career
- Fields: Neuroscience
- Thesis: VLSI analogs of neuronal visual processing: a synthesis of form and function (1992)
- Doctoral advisor: Carver Mead

Michelle Anne Mahowald (January 12, 1963 – December 26, 1996) was an American computational neuroscientist in the emerging field of neuromorphic engineering. She was a pioneer in the development of the VLSI retina, which allowed for essentially the creation of an electronic eye. In 1996, she was inducted into the Women in Technology International Hall of Fame for her development of the Silicon Eye and other computational systems. She had later struggled with psychosis and died by suicide at age 33.

== Early life and education ==
External videos
- “Silicon Vision – Misha Mahowald” Films for the Humanities and Sciences
- “Dr. Misha Mahowald: WITI Hall of Fame 1996 Induction Video”, Women in Technology International

Michelle, known as Misha, was born in Minneapolis, Minnesota, daughter of Alfred and Joan Fischer Mahowald. She had a younger sister, Sheila.

After graduating high school, she attended the California Institute of Technology. In her junior year as an undergraduate, she was student in the course in computational neurophysics taught by Richard Feynman, John Hopfield, and Carver Mead with the course title of The Physics of Computation. Inspired by Hopfield's presentation on the collective intelligence of neural networks, she had decided to do her student project on the retina with Hopfield. Although Mahowald was biology major, she prepared a paper on the retina for her teaching assistant David Feinstein (Note: Feinstein was the person Mahowald asked to visit her on Christmas morning before she had committed suicide) with a model of the system resembling that of a computer chip. The paper was later brought to Hopfield for review. The model has feedback loops for how the retina worked, which was a different approach to Hopfield's lectures on neural modeling. The professor's and the student's viewpoints differed in terms of the feedback loops, and Feinstein recommended for the other professor, Carver Mead, a specialist in VLSI, to have the presentation. From there, she began to work in Mead's lab at the university.

She later graduated with a degree in biology in 1985. She continued at Caltech as a PhD student in Computation and Neural Systems under the supervision of Professor Carver Mead in a continuation of her work with Mead's lab as an undergraduate. While in graduate school, she collaborate with Carver Meade and Massimo Sivilotti for the 1988 patent titled Integrated Sensor and Processor for Visual Images. The background for the invention statement in the patent begins with the following introduction:

This invention relates to an integrated sensor and analog signal processor for visual images, and in particular to an integrated sensor and processor which emulates the vertebrate retina in producing space-time derivative signals in response to image pixels.

For her thesis, Mahowald created her own project by combining the fields of biology, computer science, and electrical engineering, to produce the silicon retina.

In a 2026 interview with Carver Mead in Circuits and Systems magazine, Mead describes how Misha Mahowald was the first person at CalTech to have proposed the building of a VLSI retina. He describes how she used analog and digital technology in steps, allowing for minimal power consumption and maximum computing power.

== Career ==
The silicon retina used analog electrical circuits to mimic the biological functions of rod cells, cone cells, and other non-photoreceptive cells in the retina of the eye. Her work has been considered "the best attempt to date" to develop a stereoscopic vision system.

She was awarded a doctorate in computational neuroscience in 1992, and her invention of the silicon retina and the silicon neuron earned her articles in the prestigious scientific journals Scientific American and Nature, as well as four patents and the Clauser Prize for her dissertation. A revised version of her dissertation was subsequently published in book form.

In the same year that she had completed her doctoral dissertation, she had applied for two U.S. patents and one international patent. The patents were the Silicon Neuron and a device for asychronous communication among integrated circuits.

=== Silicon Neuron ===
On May 11, 1992, she had filed for the Silicon Neuron international patent, which was in patented in collaboration with Rodney Douglas of Oxford University and with the Medical Research Council of London (the U.K.'s national medical research agency) as the assignee. The abstract for the patent begins with the following introduction:

An integrated circuit having a plurality of interdependent differential pairs of CMOS transistors emulates the functional characteristics of a biological neuron. The gate voltage of a first one of each pair of transistors is settable to a threshold value corresponding to an activation threshold of an ion channel in the biological neuron and the gate of a second one of each pair of transistors is representative of an incoming membrane potential, ligand concentration or ion concentration of the biological neuron.

She and Douglas also filed for a U.S. patent on November 5, 1992.

=== Apparatus for Carrying Out Asynchronous Communication Among Integrated Circuits ===
On June 15, 1992, Mahowald filed the patent application for the patent titled an Apparatus for Carrying Out Asynchronous Communication Among Integrated Circuits, in collaboration with Massimo Sivilotti and with the California Institute of Technology as the assignee. The patent presents the new technology with the following statement:

Real-time sensorimotor processing as complex as that performed by the common house fly is unattainable even with today's fastest digital computers. The computational ability of the fly is incomparable to that of the digital computer because the principles of digital computation are fundamentally unlike those used in the nervous system. The computer reduces the information on its wires to 1 bit and combines the information in a sparsely connected array of logic gates. In contrast, neurons communicate in analog values and are richly interconnected.

=== Relocation to Europe ===
Mahowald then re-located to the University of Oxford for one year to do a post-doctoral fellowship with eminent neuroscientists Kevan Martin and Rodney Douglas. At Oxford, she was with the Medical Research Council Anatomical Neuropharmacology Unit.

After the completion of the fellowship project, Mahowald moved in 1995 to Zürich with Rodney Douglas and Kevan Martin to help found the Institute of Neuroinformatics (Institut für Neuroinformatik) at the University of Zurich and ETH Zurich, a research institution whose mission is to discover the key principles by which brains work and to implement these in artificial systems that interact intelligently with the real world. Their main accomplishment was the "canonical cortical microcircuit", which was a type of basic electronic neurode that could be assembled into groups for the functions of neuromorphic computation.

In 1995, she and Massimo Sivilotti were awarded a patent for their asychronous communication among integrated circuits invention. In the following year, she was made a member of the Women in Technology International (WITI) Hall of Fame. In the same year, Mahowald died in Zürich at the end of 1996, taking her own life at the age of 33. About half a year later, the Silicon Neuron patent that she had collaborated on while at Oxford was awarded a U.S. patent on July 15, 1997.

Aspects of her work and personal life have been described in George Gilder's book The Silicon Eye: How a Silicon Valley Company Aims to Make All Current Computers, Cameras, and Cell Phones Obsolete (2005), with chapters 11 and 12, Michelle and Misha, respectively. According to the book, she suffered from psychosis, the inability to determine the difference between what is real and what is not real). She had told David Feinstein (the teaching assistant who had assisted her back when she was an undergraduate with what would become her inventions) that if she died before Christmas Day comes to an end in her home state of Minnesota, she would have salvation and would avoid her sense of madness. Feinstein was later notified that she had died by jumping in front of a train in Geneva at 6 AM, which was 11PM on Christmas Day in Minnesota. According to the book, she had a prior history of using LSD and THC to manage her psychosis and had stopped use of those drugs earlier on. The book adds a statement by Feinstein of how Carl Jung also struggled with psychosis in his 30s. However, the psychotic period ended, and the experience became something that was "empowering him to do his life's work."

== Award ==
The Misha Mahowald Prize for Neuromorphic Engineering was created to recognize outstanding achievements in the field of neuromorphic engineering and was first awarded in 2016.

== International recognition ==
In 2021, a patent in Taiwan, A physiological monitoring system that improves the accuracy of heart rate and breathing detection, refers to Mahowald's work with the following statement (translated from Chinese):

The Neuromorphic Visual Sensor (DVS) is an event-driven optical sensor that captures dynamic changes in a scene. The technical origins of DVS trace back to 1991, when Misha Mahowald developed a silicon retina that mimics the human retina during neural information research. This silicon retina structure removes average intensity levels when collecting optical information. It only responds to changes in time and space, saving a large amount of information flow.

== Inventions and publications by Misha Mahowald ==
For more complete bibliography, please see Bibliography of Misha Mahowald

U.S. Patents Assigned to Misha Mahowald
Title	Inventors	Year
Integrated Sensor and Processor for Visual Images	Carver Mead; Michelle A. Mahowald; Massimo A.Sivilotti	1988
Silicon Neuron (international patent)	Rodney Douglas Michelle A. Mahowald	1993
Apparatus for Carrying Out Asynchronous Communication Among Integrated Circuits	Michelle A. Mahowald; Massimo A.Sivilotti	1995
Silicon Neuron	Rodney Douglas Michelle A. Mahowald	1997

Publications by Misha Mahowald
Title	Author	Year
The Silicon Retina (article in Scientific American)	Misha Mahowald Mead Carver	1991
VLSI Analogs of Neuronal Visual Processing: A Synthesis of Form and Function	Michelle (Misha) A. Mahowald	1992
An Analog VLSI System for Stereoscopic Vision (Revised version of the dissertation for publication)	Misha Mahowald	1994
