= Critical path =

Critical path may refer to:

- The longest series of sequential operations in a parallel computation; see analysis of parallel algorithms
- Critical path method, an algorithm for scheduling a set of project activities
- Critical Path (book), by Buckminster Fuller
- The Critical Path: An Essay on the Social Context of Literary Criticism, a 1971 book by Northrop Frye
- The Critical Path, a podcast by Horace Dediu
- Critical Path (video game), an interactive movie computer game
- Critical Path, Inc., a provider of messaging services
- Critical Path Institute, an organization for improvement of the drug development process
- Critical Path Project, a video archive
- Critical Path Project, early source of HIV/AIDS information founded by Kiyoshi Kuromiya
- "The Critical Path" (Murder City), a 2004 television episode
