= Sam Wang (neuroscientist) =

American professor, neuroscientist, psephologist and author

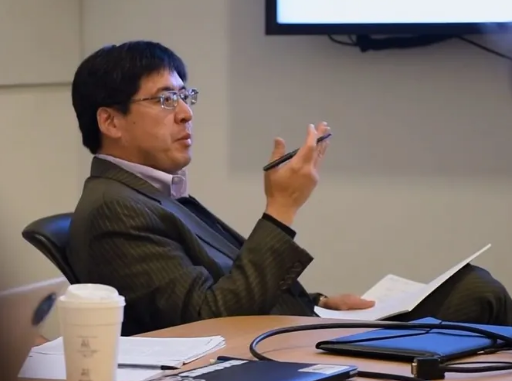
- Born: Samuel Sheng-Hung Wang; 1967 (age 58–59)
- Education: California Institute of Technology (BS); Stanford University (MS, PhD)
- Scientific career
- Fields: Neuroscience
- Doctoral advisor: Stuart Thompson
- Other academic advisors: George J. Augustine; David W. Tank; Winfried Denk

Samuel Sheng-Hung Wang (born 1967) is a Taiwanese-American professor, neuroscientist, psephologist, author, and politician. He is known as the co-author of the books Welcome to Your Brain and Welcome to Your Child's Brain, as well as the Princeton Election Consortium psephology website. Wang also gives talks about child brain development, autism, politics, and gerrymandering on television and radio, to academic audiences and for the general public. On January 27, 2026, Wang announced he would seek the Democratic nomination for New Jersey's 12th congressional district in 2026. He lost in the Democratic primary on June 2, 2026.

== Early life and education ==
Wang was raised in Riverside, California, to a Taiwanese American family. His parents emigrated from Taiwan to the United States in the 1960s. He attended the California Institute of Technology and graduated in 1986 with a B.S. in physics with honors at the age of 19, making him the youngest member of his graduating class. He went on to earn a PhD in neuroscience at Stanford University.

== Career ==
After receiving his PhD, Wang worked at Duke University with George James Augustine as a postdoctoral fellow, for the Senate Committee on Labor and Human Resources, and as a postdoctoral member of technical staff with David Tank and Winfried Denk at Bell Labs in Murray Hill, New Jersey. There, he used pulsed lasers and two-photon microscopy to study brain signaling.

In 2006, Wang became an Associate Professor of Molecular Biology and Neuroscience at Princeton University; in 2015, he was promoted to Professor of Neuroscience. His current research program addresses learning and plasticity in the brain, with a focus on the cerebellum, a major brain structure that processes sensory information and guides movement and cognitive/emotional processing. He has a major interest in autism, a disorder often correlated with disruption of the cerebellum's structure.

Wang has published over one hundred articles on the brain in leading scientific journals and has received numerous awards. He gives public lectures on a regular basis and has been featured in The New York Times, The Wall Street Journal, NPR, and the Fox News Channel.

Wang has been widely honored for his scholarship and his advances in neuroscience. He has received the Alfred P. Sloan Fellowship, the Rita Allen Foundation Young Scholars Fellowship, a Distinguished Young Investigator Award from the W. M. Keck Foundation, and a CAREER award from the National Science Foundation. He was also selected by the American Association for the Advancement of Science as a Congressional Science and Engineering Fellow. In 2015, New Jersey Governor Chris Christie appointed him to the Governor's Council for Medical Research and the Treatment of Autism.

Wang is also a faculty associate with Princeton's Program in Law and Public Affairs. In 2017, he founded the Princeton Gerrymandering Project, a website that allows users to check for gerrymandering in the districts of their choice using three statistical tests: Student's t-test, the Median test, and the Monte Carlo method. He also co-authored an amicus brief for Gill v. Whitford with Heather K. Gerken, Jonathan N. Katz, Gary King, and Larry Sabato in favor of partisan symmetry tests for gerrymandering.

In early 2026, Wang announced he was running as a Democrat in New Jersey's 12th congressional district after the incumbent, Bonnie Watson Coleman, announced she would not seek reelection. Wang is one of thirteen candidates running in the primary, and has received endorsements from Harvard Law School Professor Lawrence Lessig and businessman Andrew Yang.

== Election predictions ==
In 2004, Wang was among the first to aggregate US presidential polls using probabilistic methods. The method's applications included correct election-eve predictions, high-resolution tracking of the race during the campaign, and identification of targets for resource allocation. Wang's calculation missed the final result by a wide margin, as he predicted that John Kerry would defeat George W. Bush by 311–227 in the electoral college, corresponding to a 98% probability of a Kerry victory. One of his alternate models did precisely predict the actual electoral outcome: Bush 286, Kerry 252.

In 2008, Wang and Andrew Ferguson founded the Princeton Election Consortium blog, which analyzes U.S. national election polling. His statistical analysis in 2012 correctly predicted the presidential vote outcome in 49 of 50 states and the popular vote outcome of Barack Obama's 51.1% to Mitt Romney's 48.9%. That year, the Princeton Election Consortium also correctly called 10 out of 10 close Senate races and came within a few seats of the final House outcome.

In 2016, PEC predicted a 93% chance of a Hillary Clinton victory in one model and a greater than 99% chance of a Clinton victory in his other model. Wang believed that polls were reliable and that errors were unlikely to be correlated. Fellow forecaster Nate Silver instead predicted that a larger error was very possible, citing the large number of undecided voters in 2016 compared to 2012, and believed that errors in state-level polling would likely be correlated. Clinton lost the 2016 election to Donald Trump by more than 60 electoral votes, with Wang stating that "In addition to the enormous polling error, I did not correctly estimate the size of the correlated error – by a factor of five." In response to Trump's victory, Wang subsequently ate a cricket on CNN, fulfilling a promise that he would "eat a bug" if Trump won more than 240 electoral votes.

During the 2020 COVID-19 pandemic Wang began tracking the spread of the disease and providing statistical data about the rate of its spread.

== Books ==
Wang's first co-authored book, Welcome To Your Brain: Why You Lose Your Car Keys But Never Forget How To Drive, was a best-seller. It was named 2009 Young Adult Science Book of the Year by the American Association for the Advancement of Science and has been translated into more than 20 languages. His second co-authored book, Welcome To Your Child's Brain: How The Mind Develops From Conception To College, has been translated into 15 languages. Both books were co-authored by Sandra Aamodt.

== Personal life ==
Wang and his wife, a physician, live in Princeton, New Jersey.
