= Micromobility =

Modes of transport involving very light vehicles

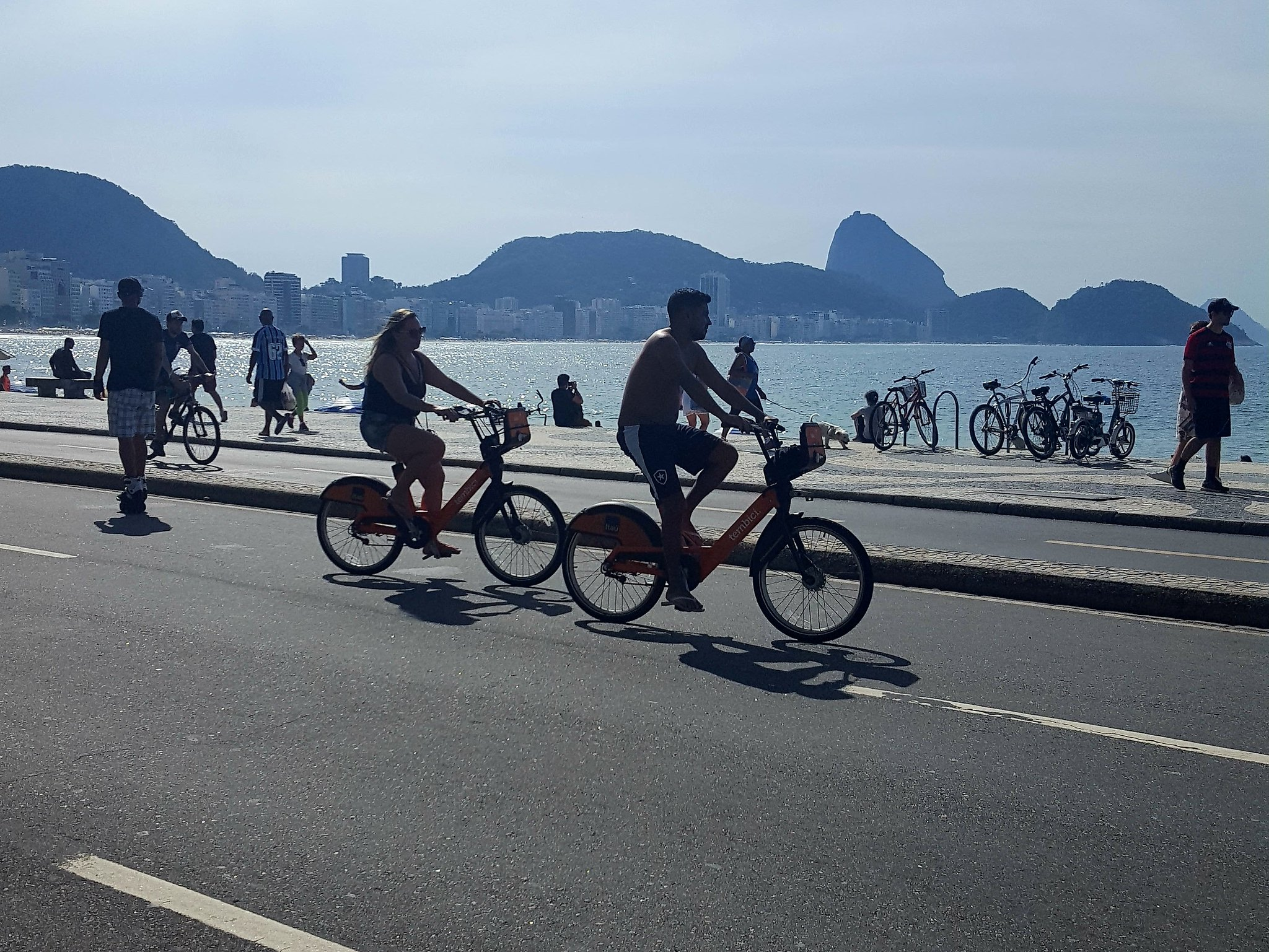
Two bikeshare BikeRio users ride in the street along Copacabana Beach during ciclovia in Rio de Janeiro, Brazil, 2018.

Micromobility is the use of small, lightweight vehicles designed for short-distance travel in urban areas and operated by their users. Micromobility encompasses a wide range of transport options, including bicycles, velomobiles, e-bikes, cargo bikes, electric scooters, electric skateboards, shared bicycle fleets, and electric pedal-assisted (pedelec) bicycles. Motorized micromobility vehicles are also known as personal transporters.

Initial definitions set the primary condition for inclusion in the category of micromobility to be a gross vehicle weight of less than 500 kilograms (1,100 lb). However, according to a standard of the SAE International in 2018 the definition has evolved to exclude devices with internal combustion engines and those with top speeds above 45 kilometres per hour (28 mph).

The term micromobility was allegedly coined by Horace Dediu in 2017. However, references to the term on the internet can be found as early as 2010.

== Characteristics ==
Micromobility uses wheeled vehicles that are low-speed, operated by a single person, and meant for travel over a short distance. Micromobility can use a combination of any, human-powered, combustion and electric based propulsion. The legality of micro-mobility, and its usage, will vary depending on jurisdiction.

Micromobility can use privately owned vehicles or those available as rental vehicles, often in the form of dockless sharing.

Devices that fall within the definition of micromobility in the European Union are typically classified as bicycles and are permitted to use bicycle infrastructure such as protected bicycle lanes, cycle tracks, cycle highways, and off-street trails. Classification as bicycles also exempts users from requirement to register them, pay vehicle registration fees, or maintain liability insurance.

Within the European Union vehicle categorization, micromobility vehicles fall under the L category, and are excluded from the M, N, O and higher categories.

== Examples ==
Bikes, electric scooters, and skateboards are all micromobility vehicles. Other types include golf carts, kick scooters, Onewheel, personal transporters, roller skates, Segways, unicycles, tricycles, handcycles, mobility scooter, quadracycles, and wheelchairs.

== Light electric vehicles ==
Many types of micromobility vehicles are also classified as light electric vehicles (LEVs). Examples of light electric vehicles include electric bicycles, electric scooters, electric skateboards, electric unicycle, and onewheel. Vehicles that are classified as LEVs differ based on individual country regulations. In the European Union, according to European regulation EU 168/2013, light electric vehicles cannot be constructed to exceed 25 km/h. Further classification of light electric vehicle differs between countries. The classification can be based on characteristics such as total mass and maximum power output.

== History ==
Micromobility vehicles such as bicycles and scooters, have been in use since the 19th century, but in the early 20th century cars began to dominate in modal share in cities such as New York. Since then, the use of bicycles for utilitarian urban transport (as opposed to recreation or sport) has been relatively low in comparison to trips made by larger vehicles outside of a few cities in China, the Netherlands, and Denmark.

=== Origins ===
Micromobility was originally in the form of bicycle-sharing services in Europe. The very first generation of bicycle-sharing was non-profit and small in scale, with the central aim to address the social and environmental impacts of urban sprawl. The white bike program in Amsterdam was unveiled in 1965, where 50 white bikes were unlocked and presented to the public, completely free of charge. Despite the program's good intentions, there were a number of significant issues resulting from theft, unorganized return spots, and overall dysfunction of the system. Similar programs were created in the following years in France (1974) and the Netherlands (1975), all located in densely populated areas of cities.

The second generation of bicycle-sharing services revolutionized the previously non-profit program into a more organized business endeavor. With docking stations and coin depositories, this approach made its way across trans-continental borders, as Wisconsin and Texas were notable adopters of the new model. Norway (1996), Finland (2000), and Denmark (2005) were among the first three countries to include locks to deter the previous predecessor's problems. However, there was still a major issue regarding the reliability of bike-sharing: the bikes themselves.

The third generation of bicycle-sharing services attempted to establish a sense of reliability and functionality with the help of advanced technologies. Tracking of each individual bicycle was enabled, reservations could be made through smart phones, and payment options were digitally compatible. As a result, the popularity of bicycle-sharing services reached a new peak. Over 100 sharing services were created spanning across 125 cities in 4 continents, though France was, arguably, the most notable. The implementation of Velo'v in 2005 was the first sharing system that integrated advanced technology, resulting in over 1,500 bicycles available through reservation from Velo'v alone. LE Velo'v STAR (2009) and Vélib were other programs that were created in conjunction with this new iteration of micromobility.

The fourth generation of bicycle-sharing services integrated further functionality and compatibility with multi-modal technologies and advanced payment interfaces. E-bikes replaced the original bicycle, and fully digitized touch screen kiosks provided a more user-friendly customer experience. BIXI, a Canadian-based service company were among the first to douse the bicycle-sharing service with 21st century technological advances. Due to the enhanced features, BIXI became the very first large-scale North American bike-sharing company, ultimately paving the way for further innovations with micromobility.

=== Pedalless ===
In 1655, Stephan Farffler, a 22-year-old paraplegic watchmaker, built the world's first self-propelling chair on a three-wheel chassis using a system of cranks and cogwheels. However, the device had an appearance of a hand bike more than a wheelchair since the design included hand cranks mounted at the front wheel. The invalid carriage or Bath chair brought the technology into more common use from around 1760. William Kent developed an early stroller in 1733. Strollers became affordable and widespread due to new manufacturing materials in the 1930s. The push scooter was invented by Denis Johnson in 1819 and usually constructed mainly from wood. Motorised scooters first appeared as autopeds enjoying a brief boom in popularity in 1915. The aluminium folding scooter popularised the push scooter in the 1990s. E-scooters first appeared in 2003. In 1882 a sports newspaper in Stockholm first reported a kicksled as a vehicle that could be kicked forwards on ice and snow. In 1965, Owen Maclaren designed a lightweight stroller with an aluminium frame further popularising the stroller. In the 1960s and 1970s skateboards enjoyed popularity, displacing kick scooters which nearly disappeared completely.

=== Pedal ===
The pedal-powered tricycle was invented by two Frenchmen, named Blanchard and Maguier in 1789. It predates the invention of the bicycle in Germany by Karl von Drais in 1817 (which did not use pedals until the 1860s). Tricycles were not popular until 1876, when James Starley introduced the Coventry Lever Tricycle, a side-driven two-track, lever-driven machine, which started the tricycling craze in Great Britain. This was replaced with the bike boom of the 1890s as a result of the popular introduction of Starley's safety bicycle.

Human-powered quadracycles were invented in 1853 and enjoyed modest popularity. This was followed by quadricycles in 1896 which included a motor. Recumbent bicycles were invented in 1893. Velomobiles (essentially enclosed recumbents) were invented in 1927. Velocars were invented by Mochet in 1932. The first mass-produced electric velomobile was the Sinclair C5.

=== Rental ===
While micromobility vehicles have long been available for users to purchase, it was the servitization of these modes of transportation—enabling users to use the nearest micromobility vehicle without having to purchase or store it, and facilitating the flexibility of one-way trips—that led to growth in areas where it was available. The rise of the sharing economy resulted in a massive increase in access to micromobility in many cities, first with the introduction of public bikeshare systems, and then with privately funded and operated dockless bikeshare and electric kick scooter (e-scooter) fleets. Most early bikeshare services specified locations, or docks, where vehicles needed to be picked up and left. From 2022 on, the so-called hybrid model, locking systems that can be locked both with and without a dock at the same time, and compatible internet-of-things (IOT) platforms have been developed.

=== 21st century ===
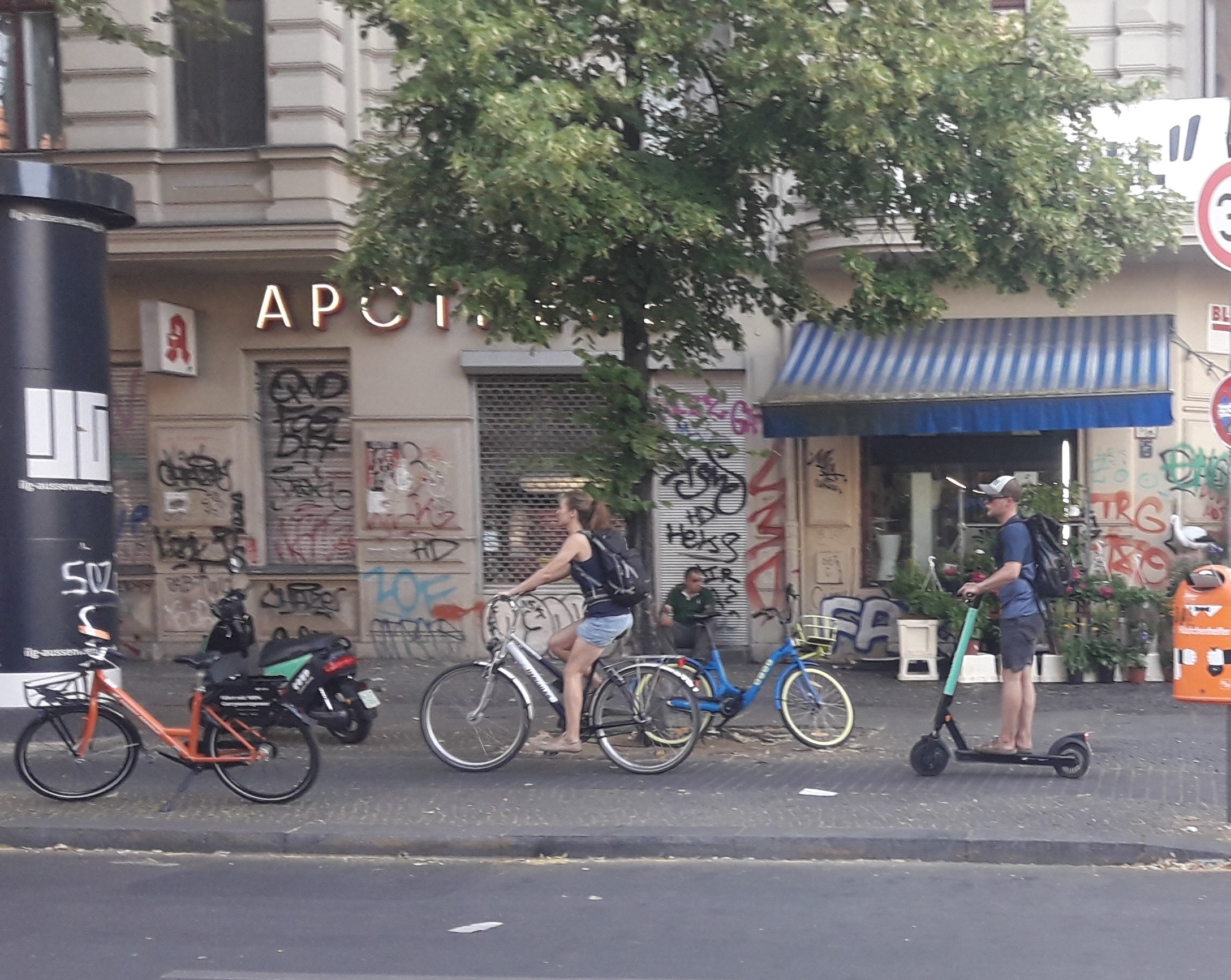
Personal and shared bicycles and Tier Mobility e-scooter-sharing system in Berlin, Germany, 2019.

The second generation was dockless bicycle-sharing, introduced in 2000; the third was dockless electric bicycle sharing, introduced in 2017.

The fourth generation of bicycle sharing services employed a dockless model which allows users to end their trip and leave the shared micromobility device anywhere or within a geo-fenced area. Dockless bikeshare first took off in Chinese megacities, and although it began with traditional, non-electric bicycles, it served as a template for what would be possible with electric and motorized bicycles, scooters, and other form factors. The availability of relatively inexpensive batteries, displays and GPS receivers, enabled by the smartphone supply chains, provided easily accessible components to facilitate dockless services worldwide. Outside of Chinese cities, non-electric dockless bikeshare has largely disappeared, with many companies switching from bicycles to electric kick scooters in 2019.

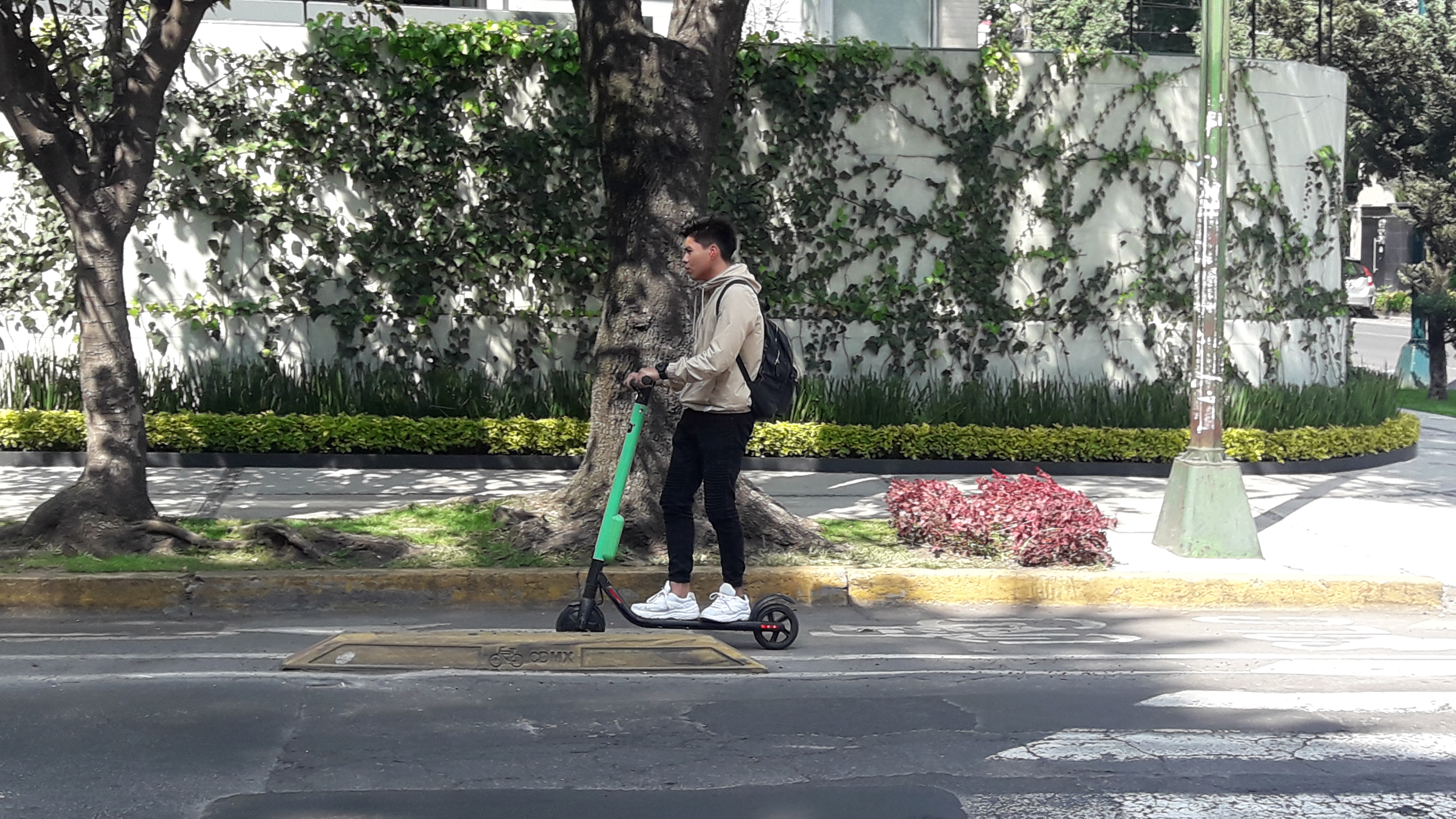
E-scooters, a form of micromobility, are popular in cities for short trips.

Shared electric kick scooters are considered to have one of the most rapid adoption rates in transport, nearly 4% in one year. Comparatively, it took bikeshare eight years to reach 13% adoption, and carshare 18 years to reach 16% in major United States cities.

== Popularity and reception ==
The speed of micromobility diffusion has not come without growing pains. Some cities were caught off guard with the sudden influx of shared dockless vehicles, especially after companies launched their fleets without municipal approval. In 2018, Seattle became the first US city to establish a permanent regulatory permit requiring shared dockless vehicle operators to meet certain requirements in order to provide service in the city. Many other cities followed suit, drafting regulatory frameworks that would permit these services and more seamlessly integrate them with existing transportation.

Operators, users and municipalities are moving toward an equilibrium where the benefits of micromobility have become apparent. Micromobility users have reported replacing between one-quarter and one-third of car trips with micromobility, and many users report being able to take trips they otherwise would not or could not have made if micromobility options were not available. The potential for micromobility to replace automobile trips, coupled with financial opportunities presented by the massive injection of venture capital into the industry, has led to global automakers such as Ford and General Motors to invest in micromobility services.

However, data shows that micromobility users also replace public transit (notably, bus) and walking trips. Concerns have also been raised about the life-cycle emissions of electric micromobility modes such as e-scooters, as well as the long-term financial viability of micromobility companies given minimal differences between product offerings and operating costs in the hundreds of millions of US dollars.

According to INRIX, the United States cities with the highest micromobility potential (in descending order) in 2019 were Honolulu, New Orleans, Nashville, Chicago, Charlotte, New York City, Portland, Pittsburg, Los Angeles, San Francisco.

=== Infrastructure ===
As micromobility vehicles are road vehicles, existing road infrastructure can be used without further investment. Infrastructure for micromobility can include cycle lanes, ramps and docking stations. Many cycle lanes only permit bicycles.

== Commercialization ==
=== Ownership model ===
The ownership segment of the market relies on consumers who have purchased their own micromobility vehicle, usually distributed through retailers. The global market for bike ownership is large in comparison to other business models, due to the fact that subscription and bike-sharing models were introduced much more recently. However, the growth of the ownership/retail market for micromobility vehicles has been minor in comparison to other faster growing options such as vehicle rental as of 2021.

=== Rental model ===
Mobility as a service (MaaS) in the context of micromobility, is the rental of vehicles as a service, allowing consumers to rent vehicles for a temporary period. Examples of companies that employ this model are Bird, Yulu (based in India), Dott, Lime, and Bolt. One mode of payment follows the pay-per-trip model, which consists of an unlock fee, as well as a per-minute rate which is charged to the user at the end of the trip (according to model used by Bird). The subscription model is an alternative method of payment, which consists of paying an often-monthly recurring fee, to have access to the vehicle service throughout the subscribed period. According to the Boston Consulting Group, subscription-based vehicle services are the fastest-growing option for micromobility usage, with the compound annual growth rate predicted to go up to 30% by 2030. Micromobility sharing and rental services have grown in the United States, with an approximately 60% increase in usage in 2019, compared to 2018. There were 136 million recorded micromobility service trips in 2019, of which 96 million used dockless vehicles, while the remaining 40 million used dock stationed vehicles.

== Issues ==
There are a lot of mechanical, electrical, and human factors hazards associated with micromobility products, which calls for aggressive policies in order to reduce injuries. The three major danger categories that apply to micromobility goods are mechanical, electrical, and human factors. Falls, collisions with objects, pedestrians, and moving cars are a few examples of mechanical risks, as are structural or frame breakdowns and braking problems. Electrical risks include issues with battery charging, fires caused by mechanical battery mounting problems (battery short-circuiting), and braking issues as a result of software faults. The risks mentioned above, as well as those related to user expectations and reasonably foreseen use cases, such as those involving user positioning (for example, probable forward body positioning due to handle placement and foot area width) and the location or operation of emergency controls (for example, brakes), which affect the user's capacity to react safely in an emergency, are all examples of human factors hazards.

=== Safety ===
Ridesharing and rental scooters have increased popularity and usage of micromobility products, resulting in being potentially used in more congested areas. This might increase the chance of accidents, especially because helmet use is limited.

There have been several injuries and deaths resulting from micro mobility products especially e-scooters, which calls for tighter personal safety regulations and policies. Between 2015 and 2019, there have been over 330 fire-related incidents concerned with micromobility products which led to more $9 million in property damage. Additionally, from 2015 through 2018 use of self balancing scooters have resulted in more than 70000 emergency room visits from falls.

Personal micromobility safety can be improved by raising awareness and training, making safety equipment mandatory for riders universally, enforcement of blood alcohol content (BAC) limits for riders, and a safer infrastructure.

Different regions have different laws regarding micromobility. While some states in the US allow riding without helmets, others have helmets as a legal requirement while commuting on micromobility products.

==== United Kingdom ====
Due to a clause in the Highways Act, these essential micromobility modes are currently prohibited in cycle lanes and on pedestrian walkways. In 2019 the Department of Transportation took steps to encourage legal change as part of the "Future of Transport" program to support micromobility options and has polled the public on the subject. E-scooters and other similar modes of transportation are the subject of numerous local trials analyzing the effects, advantages, and difficulties they provide. One example that has been successful is in Cambridge, where e-bikes have joined e-scooters on the streets.

==== European Union ====
Across the EU, different countries have their own legislations with respect to electric scooters and electric bikes. For example, Germany allowed e-scooters on roads with a maximum speed of 20 km/h (12.4 mph). In France, e-scooter parking on sidewalks is prohibited and carries a €135 fine. Additionally, e-scooters cannot technically travel at speeds greater than 25 km/h (15.5 mph) in Paris. Most countries in Europe have converged around the 25 km/h (15.5 mph) speed limit consensus.

==== United States ====
There has been a lack of focus surrounding the micromobility sector in the US, so different states have their own laws with respect to micromobility products. 10 states have banned the use of e-scooters in public, while 38 states permit their use. Hawaii recently incorporated electric scooters into traffic law.

===== Infrastructure in the United States =====
The 2022 Inflation Reduction Act provided opportunities for improving the micromobility infrastructure globally. Some of the infrastructure limitations include a lack of charging stations and lack of bike lanes for micromobility. A proposed solution is integration of a micromobility system into the pre-existing infrastructure in order to streamline the experience. Improving the micromobility infrastructure can lead to a reduction in emissions and contribute to the carbon neutrality goal.

== Gallery ==
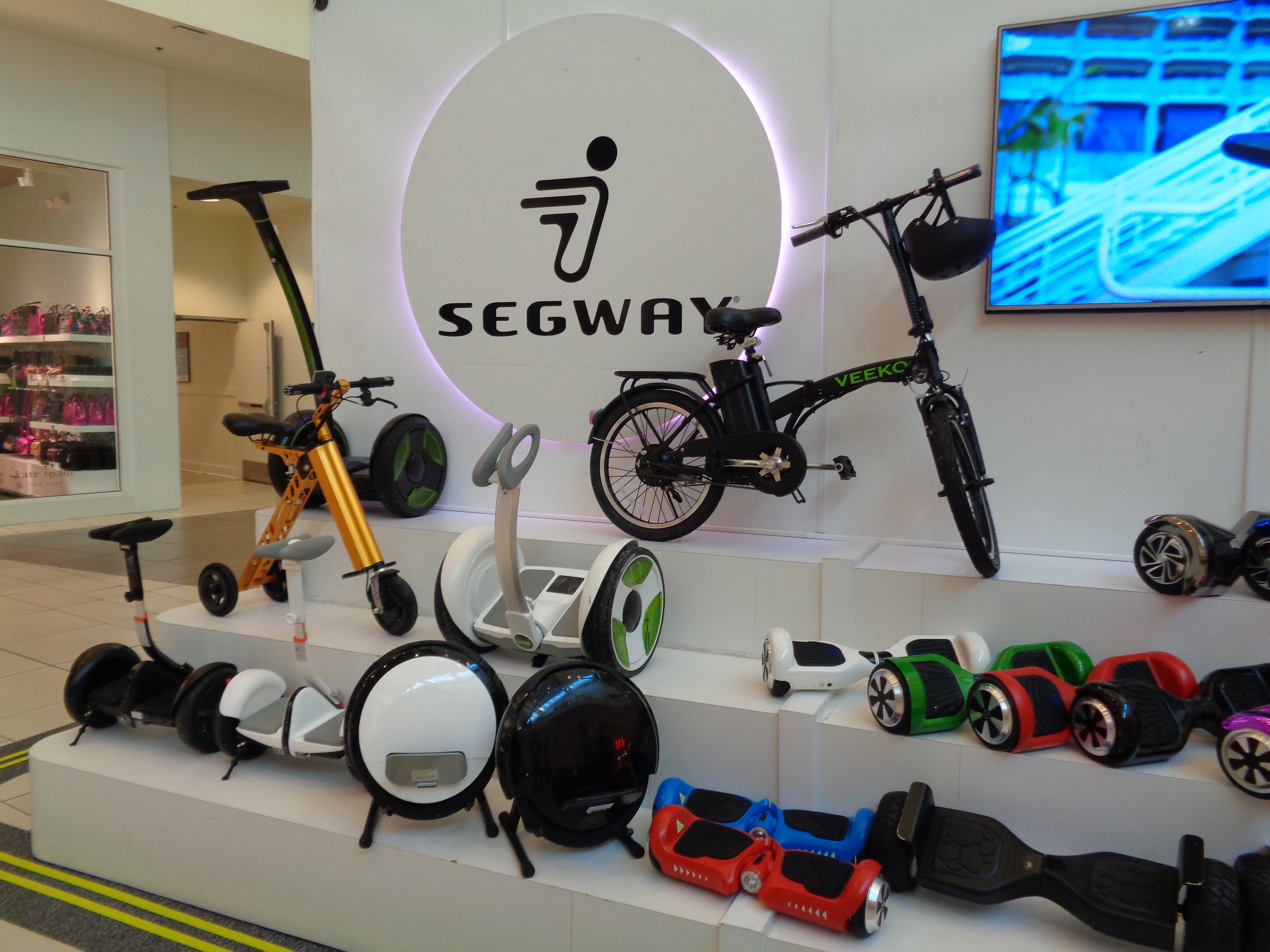
Segway, hoverboard, electric unicycle, a-bike, electric bicycle

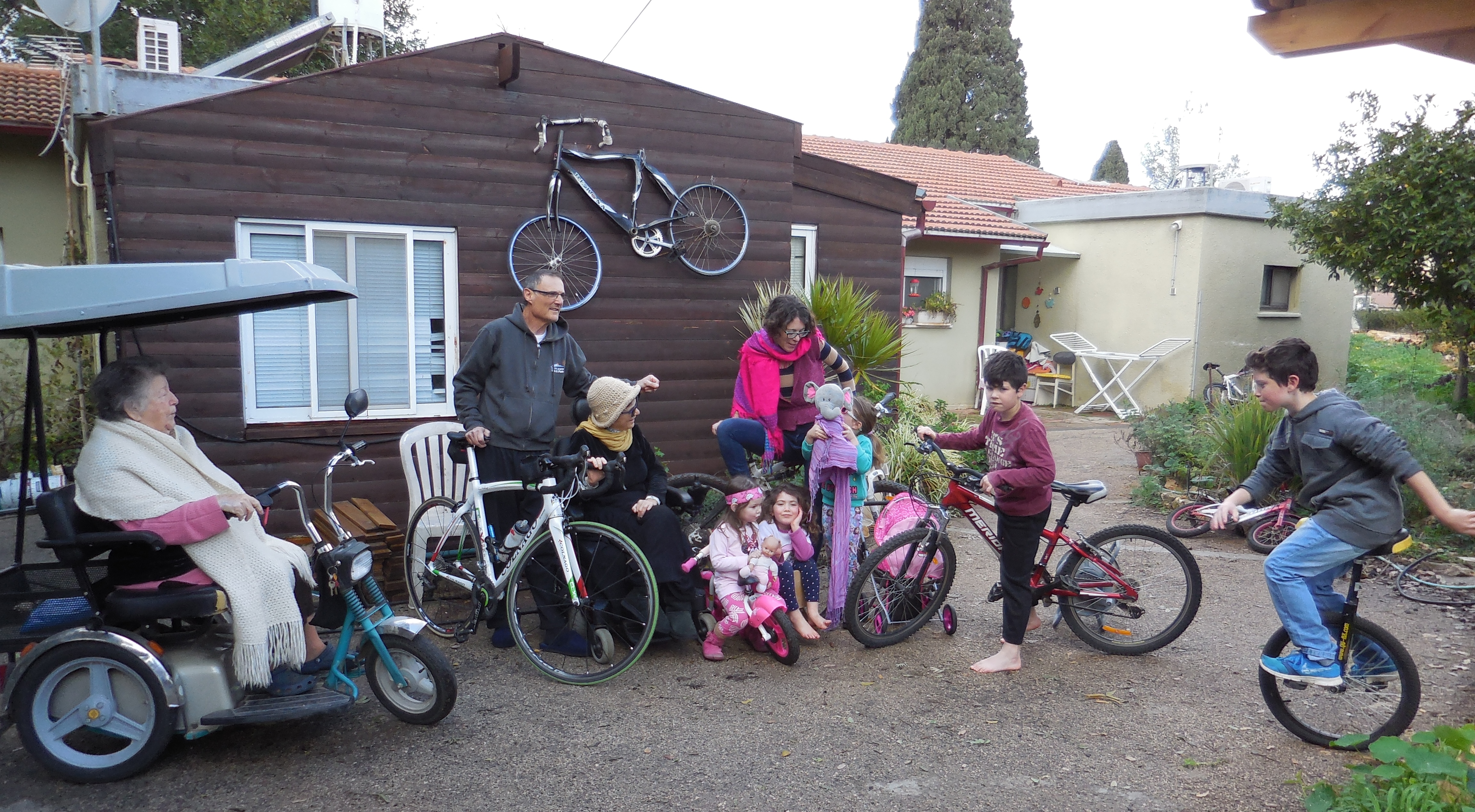
Various 20th century micromobility vehicles

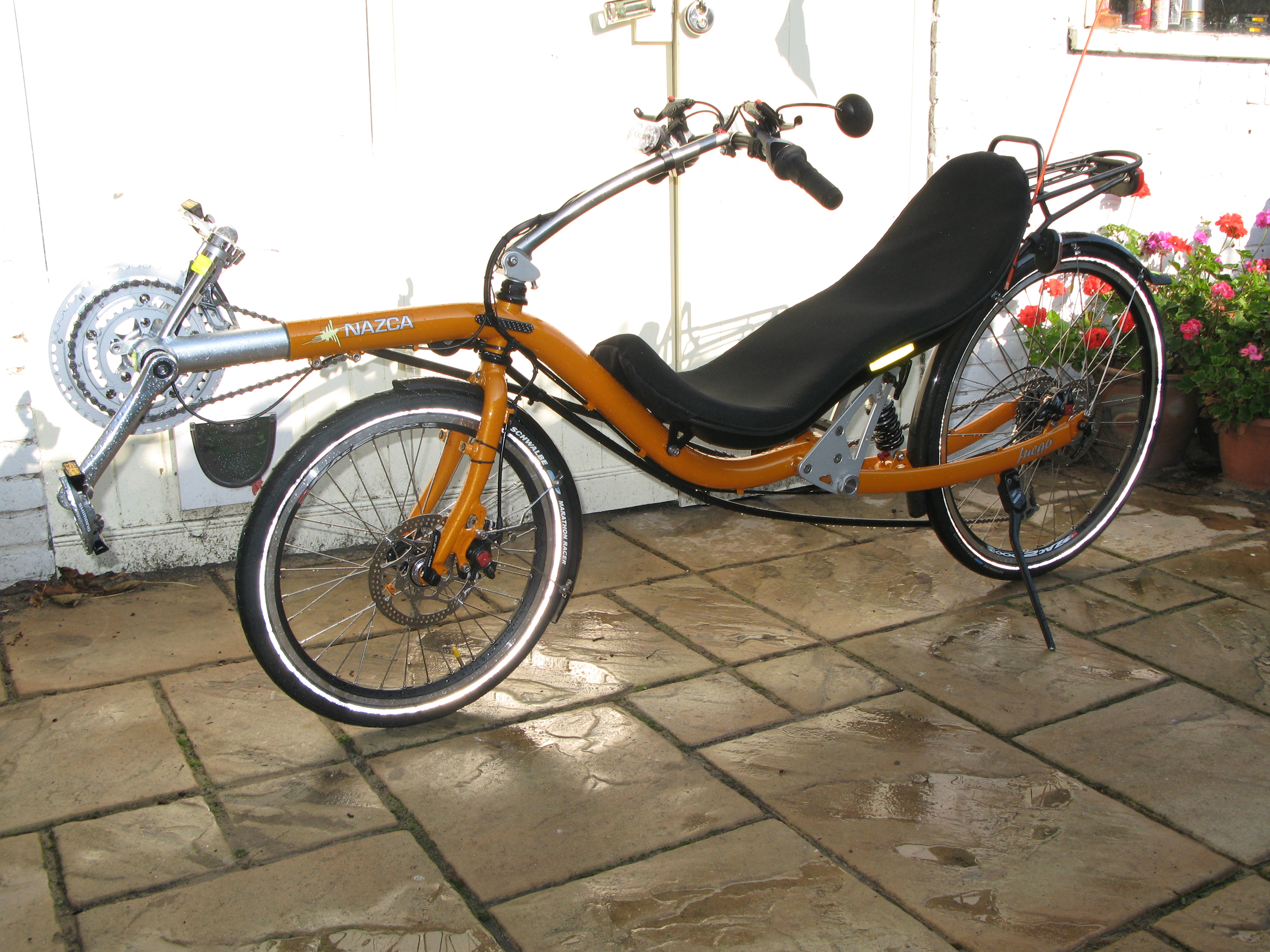
Recumbent bike

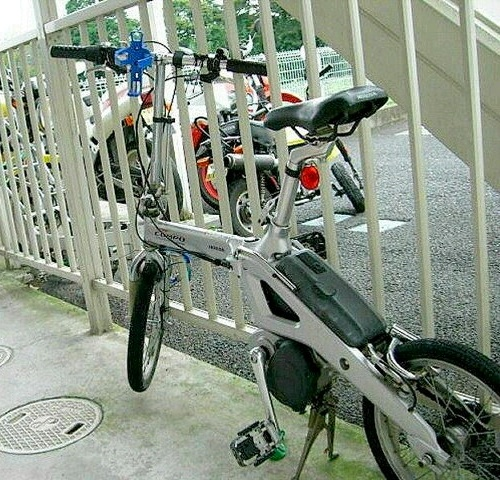
First folding electric bike Honda Step Compo

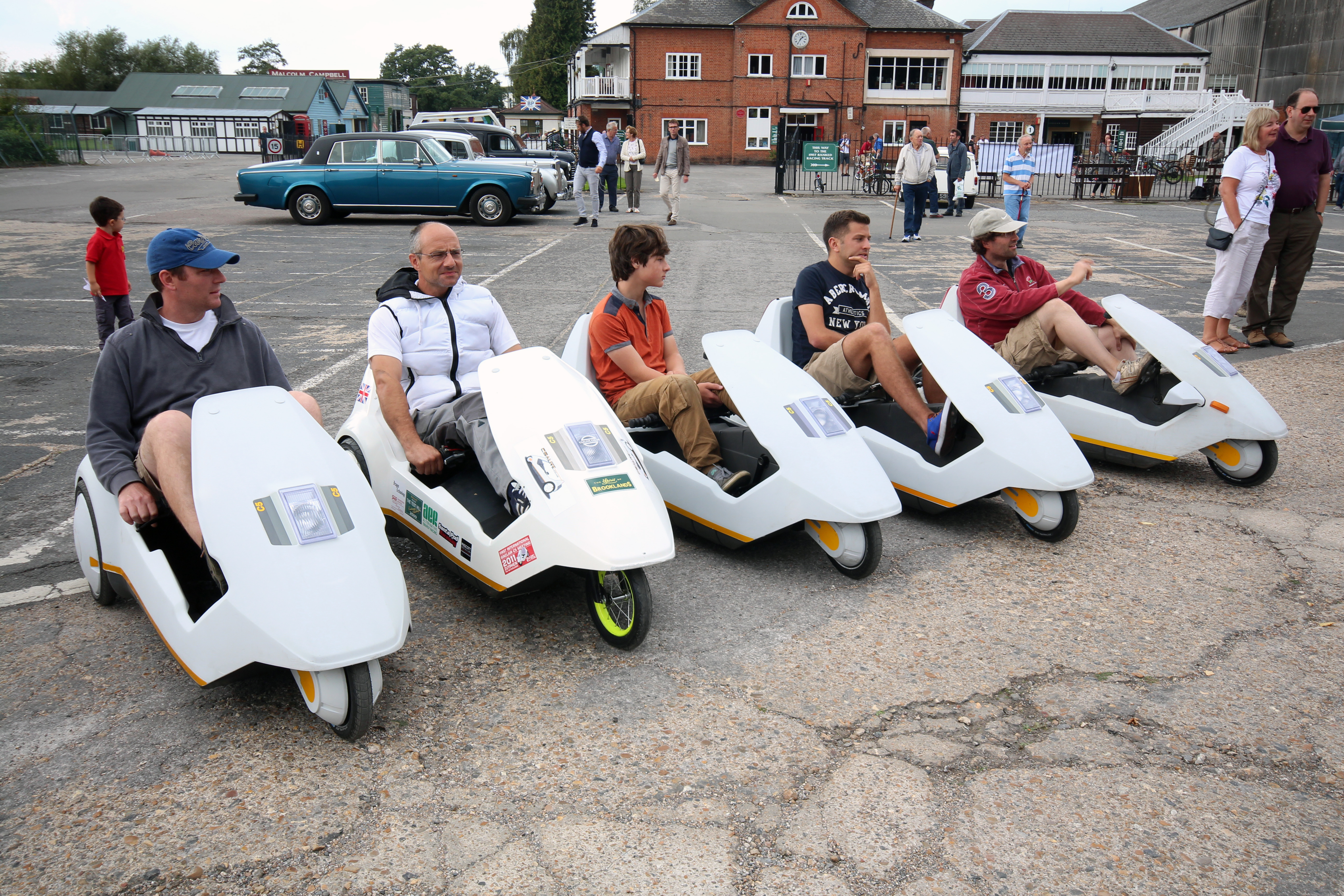
Sinclair C5, the first mass-produced electric velomobile

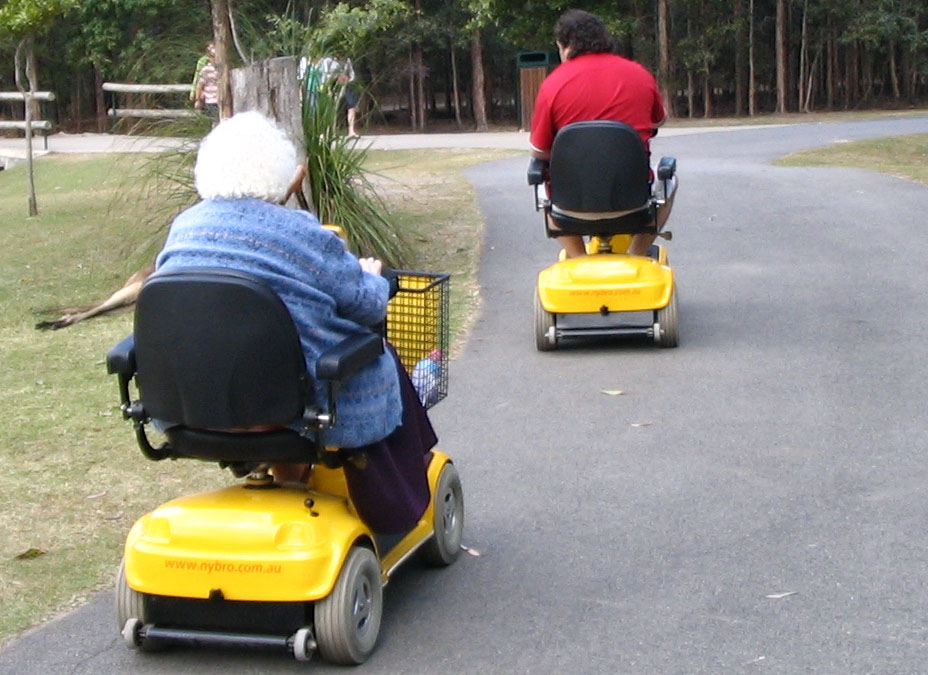
Mobility scooter

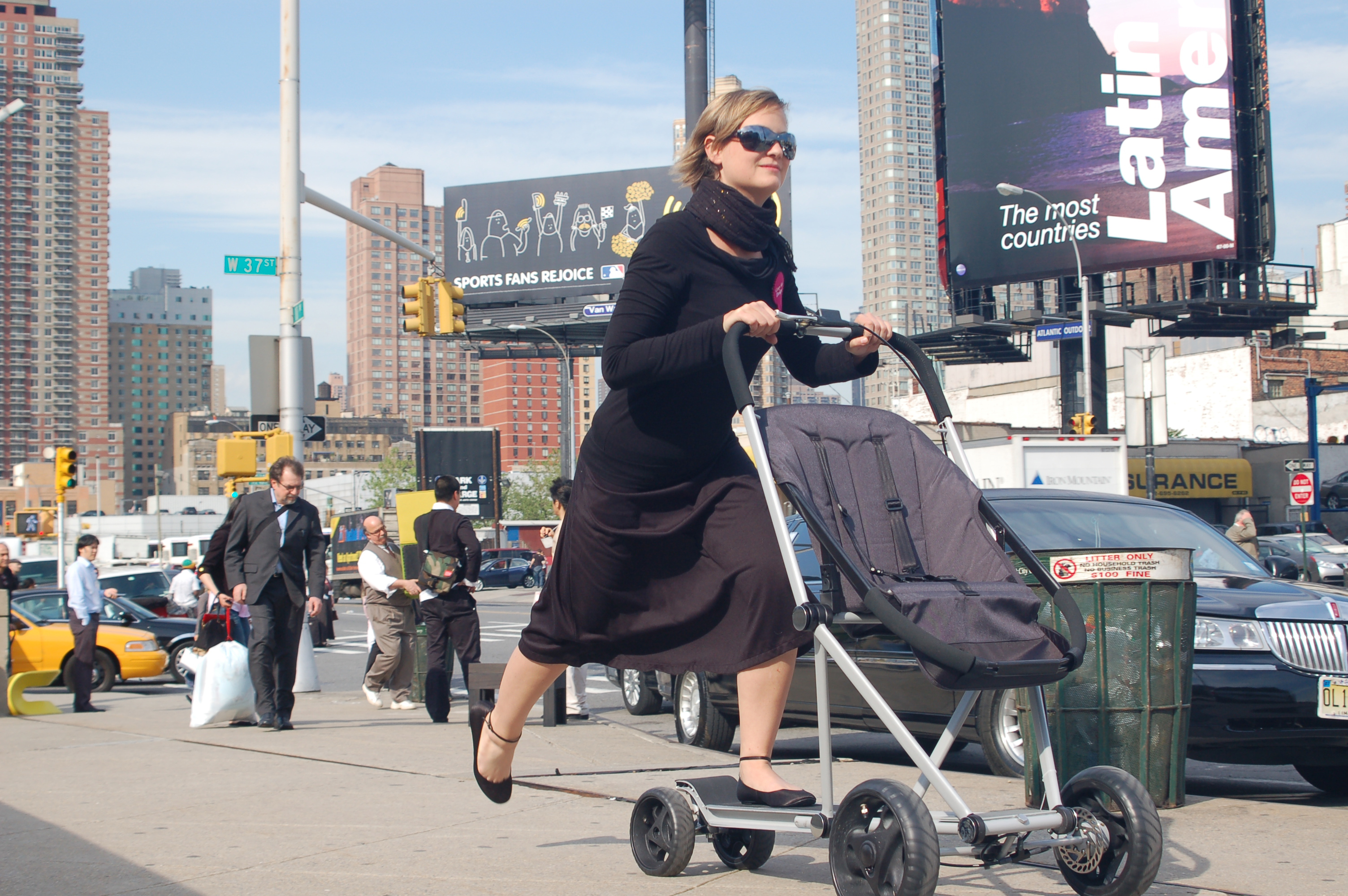
Roller Buggy baby stroller

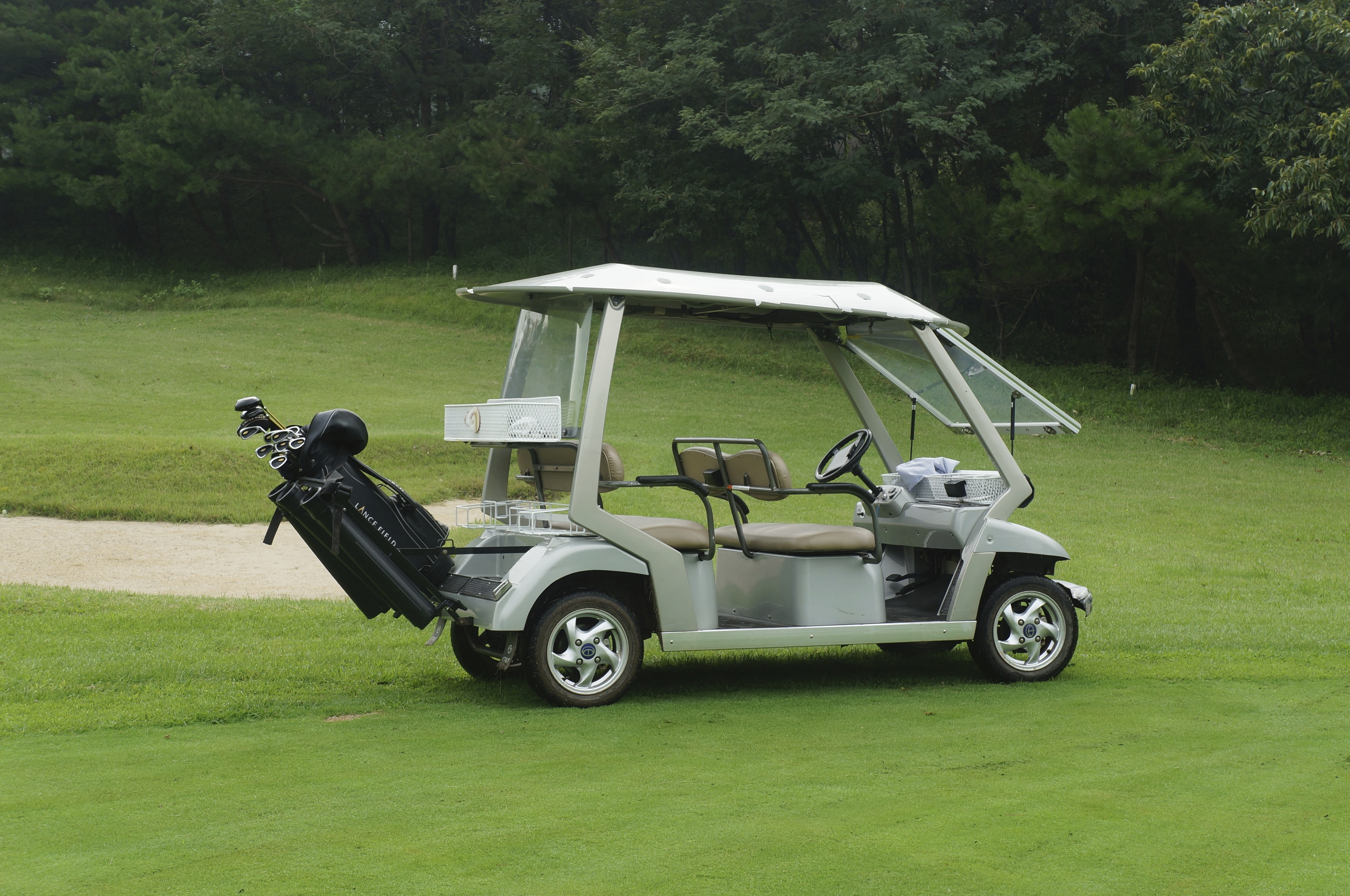
Electric golf cart

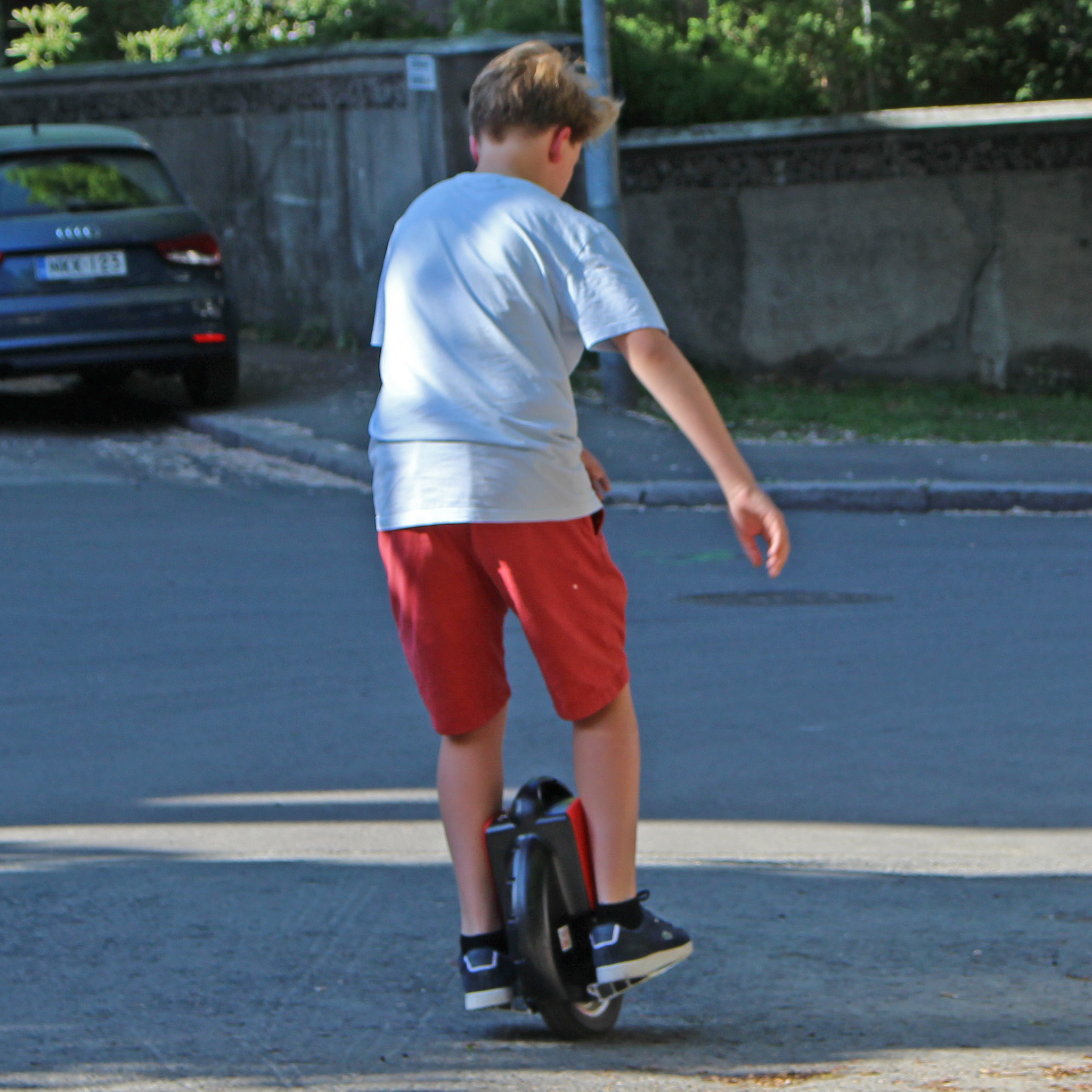
Solowheel

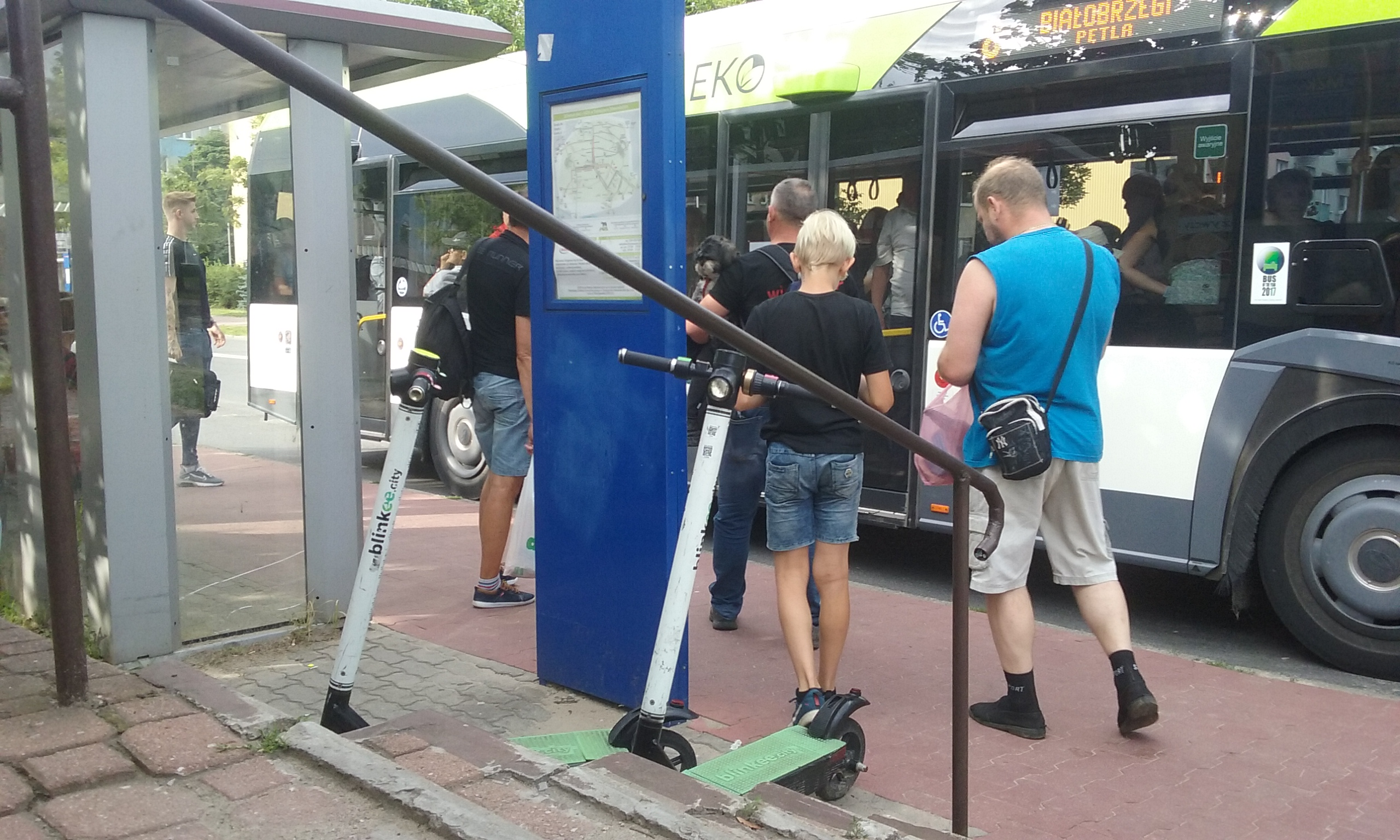
Shared electric scooters at the public transport stop in town in Poland

== See also ==
- Last mile (transportation)
