= George J. Augustine =

American neuroscientist

- Augustine in 2019
- Born: George James Augustine; 1955 (age 70–71)

Academic background
- Education: University of Maryland, Baltimore
- Academic advisors: Erwin Neher; Roger Eckert

Academic work
- Discipline: Biology
- Sub-discipline: Neuroscience
- Institutions: University of California, Los Angeles; Max Planck Society; Nanyang Technological University; Duke University
- Notable students: Sam Wang
- Main interests: Calcium signaling; optogenetics
- Notable works: Neuroscience (2017)
- Influenced: Karl Deisseroth

George James Augustine (born 1955) is an American neuroscientist known for his work on presynaptic mechanisms of neurotransmitter release and his contributions to the development of optogenetics, a tool to control neural activity using light. He was the editor-in-chief of the journal Brain Cell Biology when the journal had published the 2008 special issue on optogenetic applications to neurology. He is best known as the author of the popular neuroscience textbook published by Oxford University Press along with lead author Dale Purves.

He was previously the G.B. Geller Professor of Neurobiology at Duke University, US. He is currently Irene Tan Liang Kheng Chair Professor in Neuroscience at the Lee Kong Chian School of Medicine, Nanyang Technological University.

== Academic background ==
Augustine obtained his doctorate from the University of Maryland, Baltimore, and trained under Roger Eckert at University of California, Los Angeles, and Erwin Neher at Max Planck Institute for Biophysical Chemistry. He was an early receipt of the Grass Fellowship from the Marine Biological Laboratory and has held faculty positions at the University of Southern California, Duke University, and the Duke–NUS Medical School in Singapore.

== Research ==
Augustine has made seminal contributions to the understanding of neurotransmitter release, showing that it is triggered by a remarkably local calcium signal. He has been influential in discovering the role of several proteins involved in the release of neurotransmitters from nerve terminals. Augustine has played a key role in the use and spread of optogenetics, a tool for interrogating neural circuits in the brain. He has used the tool to investigate neural circuits involved in Parkinson's disease, Rett syndrome, and impulsive behaviour.

== Selected publications ==
=== Books ===
- Dale, Purves; Augustine, George J.; Fitzpatrick, David; Hall, William C.; LaMantia, Anthony-Samuel; Mooney, Richard D.; Platt, Michael L.; White, Leonard E., eds. (2017). Neuroscience (6th ed.). New York: Oxford University Press. ISBN 978-1-60535-380-7.

=== Articles ===
- Augustine, George J.; Charlton, Milton P.; Smith, Stephen J. (1987). "Calcium Action in Synaptic Transmitter Release". Annual Review of Neuroscience. 10: 633–693. doi:10.1146/annurev.ne.10.030187.003221. PMID 2436546.
- Smith, Stephen J.; Augustine, George J. (1988). "Calcium Ions, Active Zones and Synaptic Transmitter Release". Trends in Neurosciences. 11 (10): 458–464. doi:10.1016/0166-2236(88)90199-3. PMID 2469165.
- Augustine, George J.; Santamaria, Fidel; Tanaka, Keiko (2003). "Local Calcium Signaling in Neurons". Neuron. 40 (2): 311–346. doi:10.1016/S0896-6273(03)00639-1. PMID 14556712.
- Arenkiel, Benjamin R.; Peca, Joao; Davidson, Ian G.; Feliciano, Catia; Deisseroth, Karl; Augustine, George J.; Ehlers, Michael D.; Feng, Guopeng (2007). "In Vivo Light-Induced Activation of Neural Circuitry in Transgenic Mice Expressing Channelrhodopsin-2". Neuron. 54 (2): 205–218. doi:10.1016/j.neuron.2007.03.005. PMC 3634585. PMID 17442243.
