= Brain Cell Biology =

- Discipline: Brain; Cell biology
- Language: English

Publication details
- Former name: Journal of Neurocytology
- History: 2006-2008
- Publisher: Springer Nature

Standard abbreviations
- ISO 4: Brain Cell Biology

Indexing
- ISSN: 1559-7105 (print); 1559-7113 (web)
- OCLC no.: 163100873

Brain Cell Biology was a journal from 2006 to 2008 that published by Spring Nature. The journal was the successor to the earlier journal of the Journal of Neurocytology. With the inclusion the successor journal, the journal was first published on July 1,1972 and had existed until December 1, 2008.

In the last article of the publication, neuroscientist and Editor in Chief George J. Augustine wrote that the October 2008 special issue Optogenetic probes of neuronal function and circuitry "promises to be a landmark in this area of research". (Note: Opteogenetic probes are devices can either control or detect neuronal activity by light.) In the closing of the last issue of the publication, Augustine wrote:

The all-too-brief lifespan of BCB recalls a line from the classic Beatles song Hello, Goodbye: “You say goodbye and I say hello”. It seems that our journal is saying “goodbye” just at the moment it was really starting to say “hello” to its audience. December 1, 2008
