= Horace Dediu =

Romanian-American industry analyst

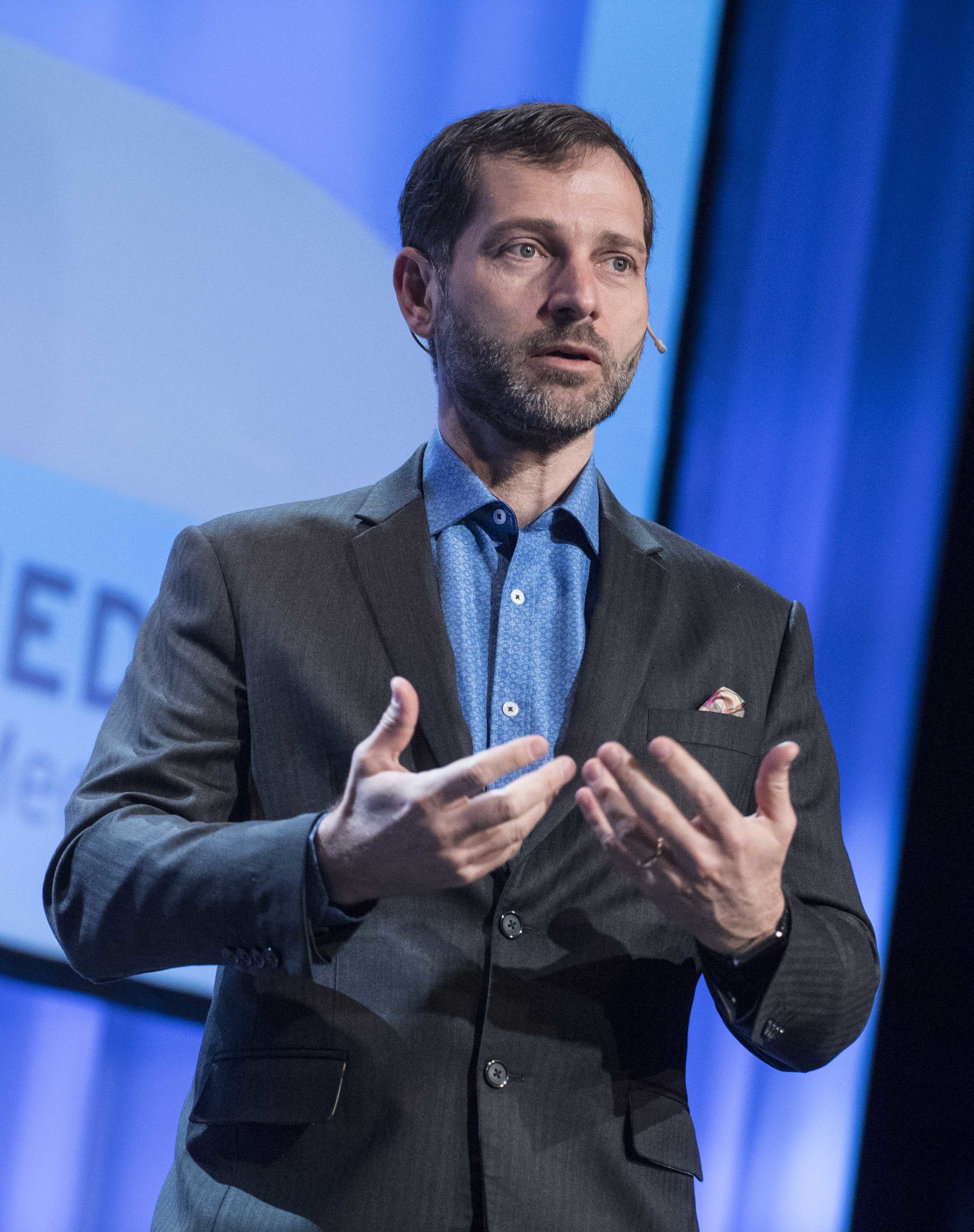
- Dediu in 2017
- Born: Horace H. Dediu; February 25, 1968 (age 58); Dumbrăveni, Romania
- Education: Tufts University (MS); Harvard University (MBA)
- Occupations: Author, journalist, mobile phone analyst
- Website: asymco.com

Horace H. Dediu (born February 25, 1968) is a Romanian-American industry analyst with a focus on mobile phones and especially Apple Inc., as well as micromobility.

He is known for his analysis of Apple's business strategy and predictions of their financials. He hosts the podcasts The Critical Path and Asymcar on 5by5 Studios, the podcast Significant Digits with Ben Bajarin, podcast Micromobility with Oliver Bruce and blogs at Asymco.

== Early life and education ==
Dediu was born in Romania, then went to high school in Medford, Massachusetts, after his parents emigrated to the United States.

After receiving a Master of Science degree in computer engineering from Tufts University, located in Medford, he received a Master of Business Administration degree from Harvard University, located in Cambridge, Massachusetts. He was a student of Clayton Christensen, and frequently cites Christensen in his podcasts and on his website.

== Career ==
Dediu was an analyst for Nokia in Helsinki, Finland, from February 2001 to April 2009 (with responsibility for Research in Motion and Microsoft).

He founded Asymco in April 2010.

Dediu also writes for the Harvard Business Review Blog, and is often interviewed by other news sources as an Apple expert.

== See also ==
- List of Harvard University people
- List of non-fiction writers
- List of people from Massachusetts
- List of Tufts University people
