= Journal of Neurocytology =

- Discipline: Neurology; Neurobiology
- Language: English

Publication details
- History: 1972-2005
- Frequency: Bi-monthly (1972-1990); Monthly (1990-2005)

Standard abbreviations
- ISO 4: Journal of Neurocytology

Indexing
- ISSN: 1573-7381 (print); 0300-4864 (web)
- LCCN: 2004233187
- OCLC no.: 37664303

The Journal of Neurocytology was a Kluwer Academic Press neurology/neurobiology journal from 1972 to 2005, addressing topics in neurocytology (the study of the nervous system at the cellular level of the neuron). It published articles mainly about the axon as well as the Schwann cell (neurolemmocytes), myelin, and synaptic vesicle. Its h-index (an author-level metric) is 79. The journal later merged into what was to become Brain Cell Biology (2006–2008). With the inclusion the successor journal, the journal was first published on July 1,1972 and had existed until December 1, 2008.
