= Analog Integrated Circuits and Signal Processing =

- Discipline: Analog integrated circuits
- Language: English
- Edited by: Mohammed Ismail

Publication details
- History: 1991–present
- Publisher: Springer Science+Business Media
- Frequency: Monthly
- Impact factor: 1.337 (2020)

Standard abbreviations
- ISO 4: Analog Integr. Circuits Signal Process.

Indexing
- CODEN: AICPEF
- ISSN: 0925-1030 (print); 1573-1979 (web)
- LCCN: 93640546
- OCLC no.: 38266453

Links
- Journal homepage; online access

Analog Integrated Circuits and Signal Processing is a monthly peer-reviewed scientific journal that is published by Springer Science+Business Media. It was established in 1991. The editor-in-chief is M. Ismail (Ohio State University). The journal covers original research, fundamental and applied, on integrated circuits used for signal processing. Publishing formats include original research, letters, and tutorials.

== Abstracting and indexing ==
The journal is abstracted and indexed in

- ACM Computing Reviews
- Astrophysics Data System
- Chemical Abstracts Service
- Current Contents/Engineering, Computing and Technology
- Earthquake Engineering Abstracts
- Ei-Compendex
- Engineered Materials Abstracts
- Inspec
- Science Citation Index Expanded
- Scopus
- VINITI Database RAS
