= Yulu (transportation company) =

Indian shared electric two-wheeler company

Yulu Bikes Pvt. Ltd.
- Industry: Mobility as a service
- Founded: August 2017; 9 years ago
- Founders: Amit Gupta, RK Misra, Naveen Dachuri, Anuj Tewari
- Headquarters: Bengaluru, India
- Products: 50,000 vehicles
- Revenue: ▲₹281 crore (US$29 million)
- Number of employees: 400
- Website: www.yulu.bike

Yulu Bikes Pvt. Ltd. (stylized as yulu) is an Indian company headquartered in Bengaluru. It provides shared low-speed two-wheeler electric vehicle (EV) services in Bengaluru, Mumbai, Navi Mumbai, Delhi, Gurugram, Noida and Hyderabad. It also has a presence in Indore, Kochi, Tirunelveli, Madurai, Kolkata, Coimbatore, Bhopal and Zirakpur through local partners. Yulu operates 50,000 dockless shared EVs and has over four million users. Riders using Yulu have travelled more than 2 billion km, helped curb 65 million kg of CO2 emissions and have made over 500 million green deliveries till date.

In 2022, Yulu partnered Canadian auto parts manufacturer Magna International to start a battery-as-a-service (BaaS) business, Yuma Energy. Yuma currently supports Yulu riders with battery swaps through its network of stations.

Yulu's investors include Bajaj Auto, Magna International, Wavemaker, Rocketship, 3One4, Blume and GEF Capital. Bajaj Auto is also the manufacturer of Yulu's third generation of vehicles. The company became India's largest EBITDA (earnings before interest, taxes, depreciation and amortisation) profitable shared electric mobility company in 2024.

== History ==
2017–2018

Yulu was founded in 2017 by Amit Gupta, RK Misra, and Naveen Dachuri. In November 2023, the company's CFO Anuj Tewari was elevated to the role of co-founder.

Yulu's CEO, Amit Gupta, had earlier co-founded InMobi. He decided to start Yulu to solve urban mobility challenges like congestion and pollution. The service was thus conceived as a ‘flexible, cheap, effective, and clean commuting’ alternative to internal combustion engine (ICE) vehicles.

In January 2018, the company began operations in Bangalore and Pune, followed by Mumbai and Bhubaneswar in the end of 2018.

2019–2021

In 2019, Yulu launched its first shared electric vehicle, the Miracle, in Bengaluru and later in New Delhi. The Miracle is a low speed EV with a 250 watt motor and a top speed of 25 km/h and is designated as a non-motorised vehicle under Indian traffic rules.

Yulu also launched its EV sharing service in Ahmedabad in 2020, but wound up its city operations in 2022, after the pandemic.

During the COVID-19 pandemic, Yulu noticed a surge in the number of delivery executives using its EVs for last-mile deliveries. To meet this demand, in 2022, the company launched its DeX model that is built for delivery professionals.

2022–Present

In 2022, the company focused on adding both size and scale. It expanded its presence in the battery as a service (BaaS) market through its associate, Yuma Energy, a joint venture company established by Yulu and Magna in 2022.

In 2023, Yulu also announced a franchise initiative, Yulu Business Partner (YBP) that empowers local entrepreneurs to launch shared EV services in the latter's own cities. Currently, Yulu has tied up with local entrepreneurs in cities like Indore, Kochi, Tirunelveli and Kolkata to bring leisure and goods mobility to these cities.

Yulu is also preparing to launch Yulu Express, a mid-speed electric scooter designed to carry higher payloads and intended for e-commerce logistics and bike-taxi services, with the launch planned for 2026.

== Business model ==
Yulu's business model involves renting low-speed (under 25 km/h), dockless EVs to users, typically for short-distance rides. In the same vein as global shared EV companies like Lime, Bolt and Dott, Yulu provides mobility as a service (MaaS) – a concept which envisages a shift from personally-owned transportation towards public and shared transport that can be accessed through a unified gateway.

After launching its services for shared people mobility in 2019, Yulu diversified into shared goods mobility in 2022. Yulu follows a cluster-based approach and has focused on high-demand pin-codes within its operational cities. In 2023, the company turned profitable at a “unit economics” level, and said that it would break-even as a business soon.

In an article, CEO Amit Gupta attributed this to the company's strong product-market fit and suitability for Indian road conditions. Gupta said that features that are unique to a developing market like India – lower vehicle ownership, shrinking road space in cities, and a need for affordable, accessible and pollution-free mobility – are driving demand for Yulu's services. The situation is different in the US, European cities like Paris, or Asian countries like Singapore which have seen micromobility players running into trouble with authorities due to reports of EV-riders becoming a nuisance.

To make the ridesharing service accessible and affordable for the price sensitive Indian market, Yulu tied up with city and Metro authorities in Bengaluru, Delhi and Mumbai to set up parking and EV pick-and-drop centres. These partners include the Delhi Metro Rail Corporation (DMRC), Bengaluru Metro (BMRCL), urban bodies like BBMP and DULT in Bengaluru, and the Mumbai Metropolitan Region Development Authority (MMRDA).

Yulu also supports quick commerce and last mile delivery companies to provide shared DeX EVs to the latter's delivery partners. These e-commerce and logistics platforms include Zomato, Swiggy, Amazon, Blinkit, Flipkart Minutes, and Zepto. The company also tied up with real estate company Prestige Group to provide on-location mobility services to users and Dayananda Sagar University in Bengaluru to provide sustainable and convenient mobility for students in the university campus. In July 2026, Yulu stated that its shared electric vehicle platform had been used by more than 12,000 women working in the on-demand home services sector across 12 Indian cities.

== Technology ==
Yulu's vehicle hardware, digital apps, and fleet management operations are built on an integrated technology platform developed by the company in-house.

The platform connects Yulu's users with its micromobility vehicles through a mobile application. It uses IoT, machine learning, and artificial intelligence for efficient demand-supply management and operations.

The company also built a battery charging and swapping system, which it launched in late 2021 under the brand of Yulu Max stations. This ‘energy’ business has since been spun off as a JV with Magna International and operates independently by the name of Yuma Energy.

In September 2022, Yulu obtained a process patent for developing an ‘Electric vehicle system for Shared Mobility’.

== Investments ==
In November 2019, Bajaj Auto invested $8 million in Yulu. In September 2022, Yulu received Series B funding of $82 million in a round led by Magna International and Bajaj. In November 2022, Yulu received a $9 million financing from the U.S. International Development Finance Corporation (DFC) to expand its electric two-wheeler rental fleet and support clean urban transportation in India. The company raised $93 million in a Series C round on 12 August 2026.
