= Critical value =

Critical value or threshold value can refer to:

- A quantitative threshold in medicine, chemistry and physics
- Critical value (statistics), boundary of the acceptance region while testing a statistical hypothesis
- Value of a function at a critical point (mathematics)
- Critical point (thermodynamics) of a statistical system.
