= Powered Scooter Share Permit Program =

The Powered Scooter Share Permit Program is a program devised by the San Francisco Municipal Transportation Agency for scooter sharing.

On April 17, 2018, the Board of Supervisors of the San Francisco Municipal Transportation Agency unanimously passed an ordinance that would require companies offering shared motorized scooters to have a permit from the SFMTA. Two weeks later the SFMTA's board of directors approved a permit system and pilot program for shared motorized scooters. This pilot program would last for 12 months and may grant up to five permits.

Starting in March 2018, several private transportation companies began operations in San Francisco, seeking to aid travelers on the last mile of their journey. Some of the many companies that trialed their scooters in San Francisco were Bird and Lime. They argue that these scooters are good for cities because they do not create emissions, are convenient, easy to use, and allow a commuter to ride a scooter the last half mile to work after taking the train or bus rather than walking.

On April 16, 2018, a day before the ordinance passed that required these companies to have a permit, a city attorney for San Francisco issued a cease-and-desist letter to Bird, Lime, and Spin for operating their shared electric scooter programs in San Francisco. Attorney Dennis Herrara stated that the companies were continuing to operate scooter rentals without permits, which create a public nuisance on the streets as well as endangering public health and safety.
