= Euwyn Poon =

Singapore-born entrepreneur (born 1984)

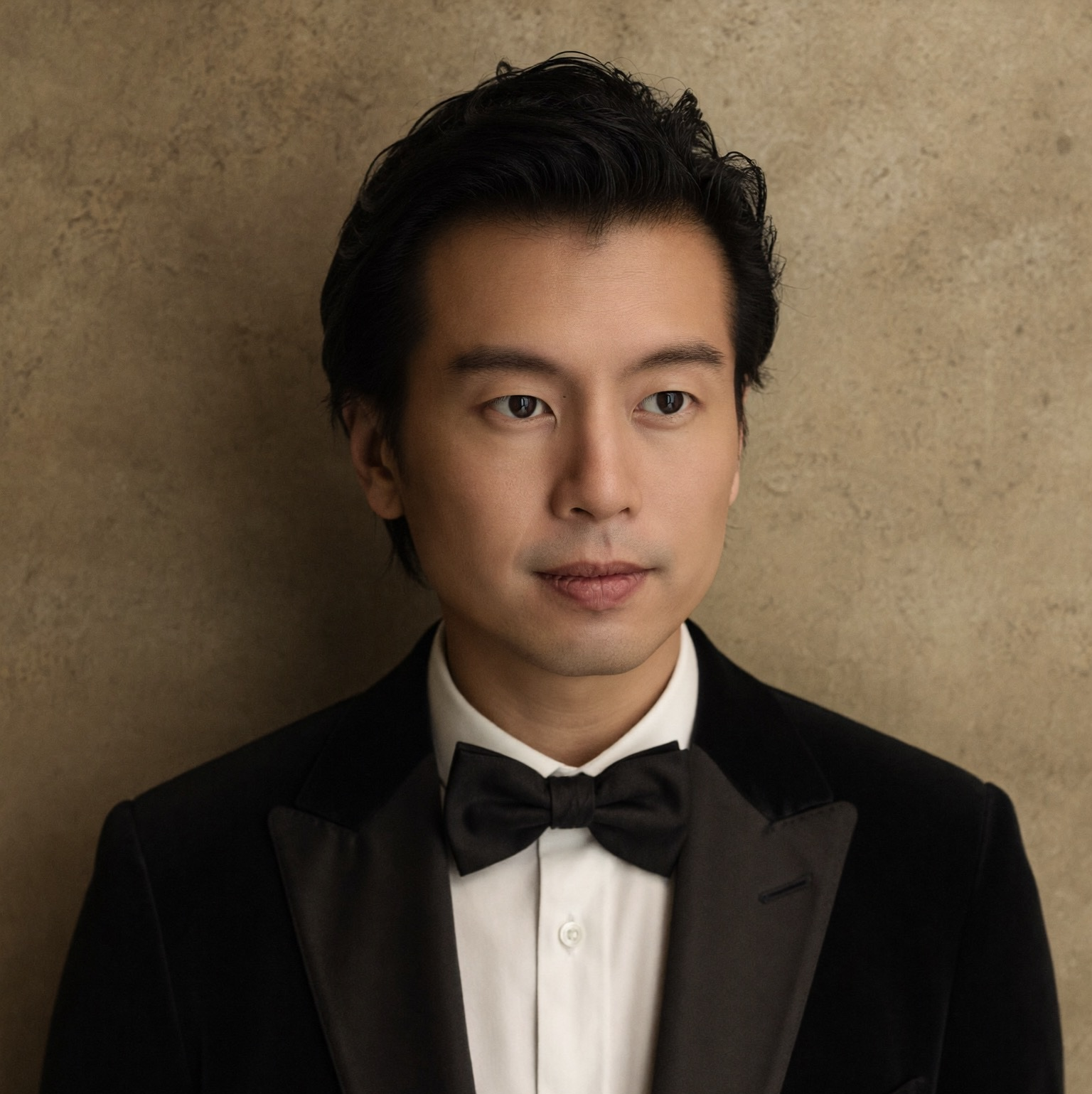
- Euwyn Poon, 2026
- Born: December 8, 1984 (age 41); Singapore
- Education: Cornell University, Cornell Law School
- Occupation: Entrepreneur
- Known for: Orbital, Spin
- Title: Founder and CEO

Euwyn Poon is a Singapore-born entrepreneur who founded Spin, a shared electric scooter company based in San Francisco that was acquired by Ford in 2018, and Orbital, a space technology company building data centers in low Earth orbit. Poon graduated from Cornell University in 2004 at the age of 18 with a degree in Computer Science and Cornell Law School in 2007. After earning a J.D. from Cornell Law School, he practiced M&A and securities law at Simpson Thacher & Bartlett from 2007 to 2009.

== Early Startups ==
In 2010, Poon founded Opzi which later became the software platform behind the First Round Network.

== Orbital ==
In 2026, Poon founded Orbital, a Los Angeles-based space technology company developing a constellation of satellite-based data centers in low Earth orbit to run artificial intelligence inference workloads. In April 2026, Orbital announced seed funding from Andreessen Horowitz's early-stage fund, a16z speedrun. The company plans to conduct its first test mission in 2027 via a SpaceX Falcon 9 launch.

== Spin ==
In 2017, Poon and co-founders Derrick Ko and Zaizhuang Cheng started Spin, which became the first company to launch a shared micro-mobility solution in the United States when it launched orange-colored bicycles with GPS-enabled locks in Seattle in July. In early 2018, Spin introduced electric scooters to its fleet of shared vehicles, which resulted in rapid growth of the business until its acquisition by Ford in November. Spin operated as the micro-mobility unit of Ford as part of Ford Smart Mobility until March 2022, when it was acquired by Berlin based TIER.
