= John Woodruff Simpson =

American lawyer

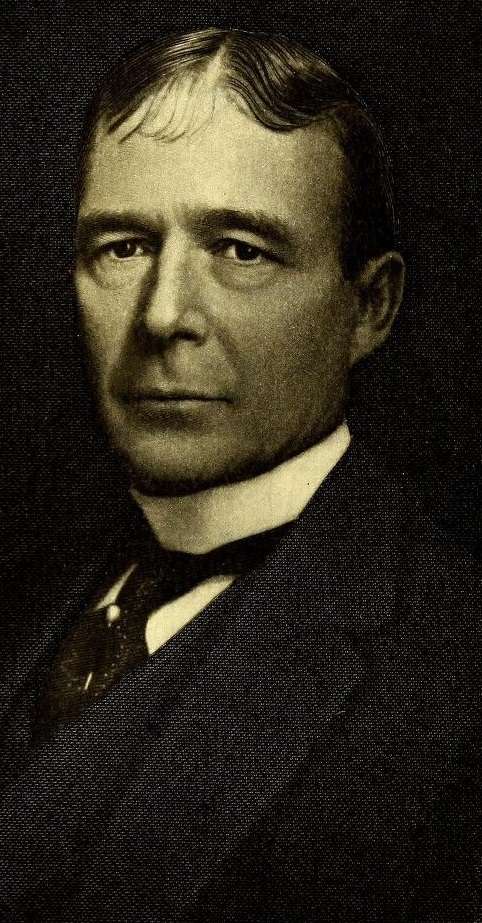
- From Volume 5 of 1923's Vermont, The Green Mountain State
- Born: John Woodruff Simpson; October 13, 1850; Craftsbury, Vermont, US
- Died: May 16, 1920 (aged 69); New York City, US
- Education: college or military academy, education in law, engineering
- Alma mater: Amherst College; Columbia Law School
- Occupation: Lawyer
- Title: Professor Simpson
- Spouse: Kate Seney Simpson
- Children: 1

John Woodruff Simpson (October 13, 1850 – May 16, 1920) was a founding member of law firm Simpson Thacher & Bartlett LLP, then titled Simpson, Thacher, & Barnum. He and his wife Katherine Seney Simpson were known as avid art collectors, with 44 pieces from their estate eventually going to the National Gallery of Art in Washington, D.C.

== Early life ==
Simpson was born and raised in East Craftsbury, Vermont, a son of James W. Simpson and Jean B. (née Walker) Simpson. He attended the State Normal School at Johnson, Vermont.

He attended Amherst College, and graduated from Columbia Law School in 1873. He served as a law clerk at the old-line firm Alexander & Green.

== Career ==
Along with his fellow former clerks Thomas Thacher and William M. Barnum, they organized their new law firm on January 1, 1884 known as Simpson Thacher & Barnum.

Simpson was one of the founding members of the "good government" organization the City Club of New York.

Simpson was a presidential elector in the 1904 presidential election.

== Personal life ==
On May 15, 1889, Simpson was married to Kate Seney (1868–1943), the youngest daughter of New York City banker, art collector, and benefactor, George I. Seney and Phoebe Augusta (née Moser) Seney. Together, they were the parents of:

- Jean Walker Simpson (1897–1980), who never married; she returned to his hometown, founded a library, and organized community Shakespeare productions.

Simpson died May 16, 1920. He left an estate appraised in 1922 at $2,665,894 (equivalent to $38.2 million in 2024). Simpson's widow Kate died in 1943.

=== Legacy ===
In the early 1900s Simpson commissioned a bronze sculpture by Moses Jacob Ezekiel in the likeness of the blind poet Homer (accompanied by a student guide), as a gift for Amherst College, his alma mater. For reasons unknown the gift was refused, and Thomas Nelson Page, a University of Virginia alumnus who was active in his college's Alumni Association, stepped in to secure the gift of the statue to the University of Virginia instead. The final sculpture, entitled Blind Homer With His Student Guide, was completed in 1907, and is currently installed on The Lawn, in the grass to the north of Old Cabell Hall.

Simpson's daughter, Jean, commemorated him by establishing the John Woodruff Simpson Memorial Library in East Craftsbury. The library opened in 1921 in the building that had formerly housed a general store operated by John Simpson's father, James Simpson.
