= Simpson Thacher & Bartlett =

Law firm based in New York City

Simpson Thacher & Bartlett LLP
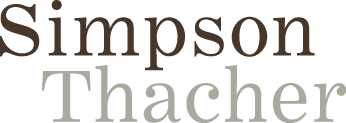
- Headquarters: 425 Lexington Avenue; New York City
- No. of offices: 13
- No. of attorneys: 1,500
- Major practice areas: Corporate law, litigation regulatory advice
- Key people: Alden Millard (chair)
- Revenue: ▲US$3.553 billion (2025)
- Date founded: 1884; 142 years ago
- Founder: John Simpson; Thomas Thacher; William M. Barnum
- Company type: Limited liability partnership
- Website: www.stblaw.com

Simpson Thacher & Bartlett LLP is a white-shoe law firm headquartered in New York City. The firm specializes in litigation and corporate practices, particularly mergers and acquisitions and private equity. The firm employs approximately 1,500 attorneys in 13 offices worldwide.

== History ==
John Woodruff Simpson, Thomas Thacher, and William Milo Barnum organized the firm as "Simpson, Thacher & Barnum" on January 1, 1884, with offices at 9 Pine Street. The three were formerly law clerks at the old-line firm Alexander & Green. In 1889, the name was changed to Reed Simpson Thacher & Barnum when former U.S. House Speaker Thomas Brackett Reed joined the firm. Reed died in 1902, and the firm name was soon renamed Simpson Thacher Barnum & Bartlett, with Philip Bartlett as the new name partner. The final change came with Barnum's retirement in 1904, when it was renamed Simpson Thacher & Bartlett.

From its original location at 9 Pine Street, the firm has operated from many offices throughout New York City, finally settling at its present location at 425 Lexington Avenue opposite Grand Central Terminal. The firm opened its Los Angeles office in 1996, Palo Alto in 1999, and Washington, D.C. in 2005. Simpson Thacher began its international expansion in the late 70s, beginning with its London office in 1978. Since then, Simpson Thacher has expanded to Tokyo (1990), Hong Kong (1993), Beijing (2007), São Paulo (2009), and Brussels (2021).

In 1974, Simpson Thacher named Conrad Harper, previously a civil rights attorney with the NAACP Legal Defense Fund, to its partnership. Harper was only the second Black partner at a major New York City law firm. Simpson Thacher has since established its Conrad Harper 2L Diversity Fellowship for qualified applicants from underrepresented backgrounds.

In November 2023, amid a wave of protests calling for a ceasefire in the Gaza war at elite U.S. law schools, Simpson Thacher & Bartlett was among a group of major law firms that sent a letter to top law school deans warning them that an escalation in such incidents, described by the letter as antisemitic, would have corporate hiring consequences. In 2021, the firm had also been among 17 global law firm signatories to a public statement denouncing growing antisemitic attacks in the U.S., published in The American Lawyer on May 27, 2021.

In May 2024, Simpson Thacher announced plans to open a new Boston office.

During the targeting of law firms and lawyers under the second Trump administration; in April 2025, the firm was among several that capitulated to the president's demands, agreeing to provide $125 million in pro bono legal work to causes backed by the administration. Two weeks later, long-time client Microsoft transferred its legal matters from Simpson Thacher & Bartlett to Jenner & Block. In July 2026, the Department of Justice subpoenaed Simpson Thacher in an investigation of the deal.

In May 2025, the firm signed a lease for office space formerly occupied by Google in San Francisco and announced plans to open a new San Francisco office in 2026.

== Notable cases ==
In 1988, Simpson Thacher, led by longtime chairman Richard Beattie, advised KKR's $25.1 billion acquisition of RJR Nabisco. Then the largest private-equity purchase in history; the details are memorialized in the book Barbarians at the Gate.

In 2004, Simpson Thacher represented the underwriters in Google's $2.7 billion IPO, then the largest technology IPO. In 2006, the firm represented Google in its $1.65 billion acquisition of YouTube.

In 2008, Simpson Thacher represented JPMorgan Chase in a loan repayment transaction that also unintentionally changed a different $1.5 billion secured loan into an unsecured loan, which caused JPMorgan Chase to suffer up to $1.5 billion of losses when the debtor General Motors declared bankruptcy in 2009. Although Simpson Thacher did not originate the error, it failed to catch the mistake—with one firm attorney praising debtor counsel Mayer Brown for a "nice job on the documents".

In 2010, the firm represented Tesla Motors in its IPO, the first IPO of a new U.S. car company since Ford Motor Co. in 1956.

In 2012, Simpson Thacher assisted the underwriters in Facebook's 2012 $16 billion IPO, then the largest technology offering, and third-largest IPO in U.S. history.

In 2014, the firm set a new record representing Alibaba Group Holding Limited in its initial public offering, the largest IPO ever conducted. The record-breaking IPO raised $25 billion, and ended its first day of trading with a market capitalization of $231 billion.

In 2016, the firm represented Microsoft in its $26.2 billion acquisition of LinkedIn.

In 2018, the firm represented Microsoft in its $7.5 billion acquisition of GitHub.

In January 2025, the firm represented Spindrift in its $650 million sale to Gryphon Investors.

In 2026, a merger between food service companies Aramark and Entier was blocked by the United Kingdom's Competition Appeal Tribunal (CMA) after Simpson Thacher & Bartlett missed a deadline to file an appeal due to what it called "misinterpretation of the rules", making it the first deal in over a year to be blocked by the CMA.

== Rankings ==
Simpson Thacher is annually ranked among the top tiers of the Vault Law 100, and AmLaw's global list of largest law firms by profits per partner, by The American Lawyer.

Simpson and Thacher ranked 21st in the National Law Journal's 2025 NLJ 500. Based on 2025 revenue, the firm ranked 10th on The American Lawyer's 2026 Am Law 200 and ranked 16th among the highest-grossing law firms worldwide on the 2025 Global 200 survey.

== Notable alumni ==
Simpson Thacher lawyers have included U.S. Senators, Solicitors General, a Speaker of the House of Representatives, a Secretary of State, a Secretary of the Army, Ambassadors, Judges on U.S. Circuit and District Courts and the New York State Court of Appeals, presidents of the American Bar Association, and presidents of the Association of the Bar of the City of New York.

=== Judiciary ===
- Guido Calabresi (Summer Associate) – Senior Circuit Court Judge, Court of Appeals for the Second Circuit.
- Thomas D. Thacher – Former District Court Judge, Southern District of New York.
- Dennis G. Jacobs – Circuit Court Judge and Former Chief Judge, Court of Appeals for the Second Circuit.
- Eric Vitaliano – District Court Judge, Eastern District of New York.
- Mary Kay Vyskocil, District Court Judge, Southern District of New York.

=== Government ===
- Cyrus Vance – Former United States Secretary of State, Secretary of the Army and the Deputy Secretary of Defense.
- Thomas D. Thacher – Former Solicitor General of the United States.
- Dwight Morrow – Former United States Senator, New Jersey.
- Thomas Brackett Reed – Former Speaker of the House, United States House of Representatives.
- Anne-Marie Slaughter – Former Director of Policy Planning, United States State Department.
- Keith Noreika – Acting U.S. Comptroller of the Currency
- Bim Afolami – MP for Hitchin and Harpenden

=== Business ===
- Suzanne Nora Johnson – Former Vice Chairmen, Goldman Sachs.
- Anne-Marie Slaughter – President and CEO, New America Foundation.
- Lynn Forester de Rothschild – CEO of E.L. Rothschild.
- Alan D. Schnitzer – chairman and CEO, The Travelers Companies, Inc.
- Euwyn Poon – President and Founder, Spin
- Michelle Jubelirer – chairperson and CEO of Capitol Music Group

=== Academia ===
- Guido Calabresi (Summer Associate) – Former Dean, Yale Law School
- Karenna Gore Schiff – Author, journalist and Director of the Union Theological Seminary.
- Eleanor M. Fox – Walter J. Derenberg Professor of Trade Regulation in the New York University School of Law
- Deborah N. Archer, Esq. – President of the American Civil Liberties Union
- Garry W. Jenkins – President of Bates College

=== Others ===
- Charlie Reiter (born 1988) – soccer player
- Val Ackerman – Commissioner of the Big East Conference, former president of the WNBA
- Whitney North Seymour – Former President, American Bar Association, Legal Aid Society, and New York City Bar Association.

== See also ==
- List of largest law firms by profits per partner
- Targeting of law firms and lawyers under the second Trump administration
