= Scoot Networks =

American electric scooter sharing company

Scoot Rides
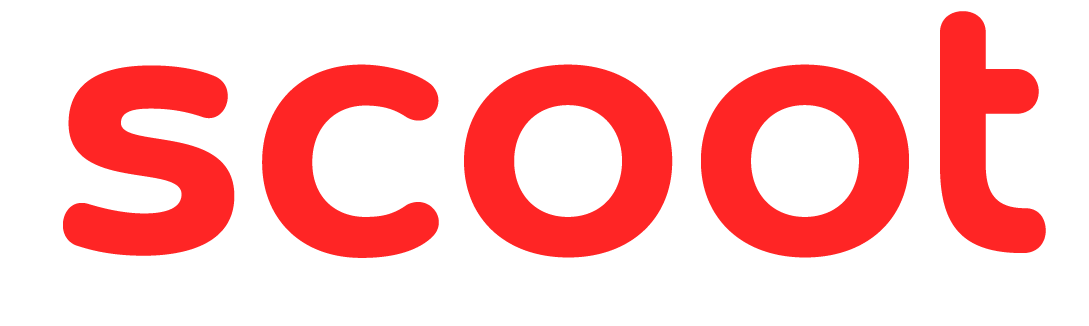

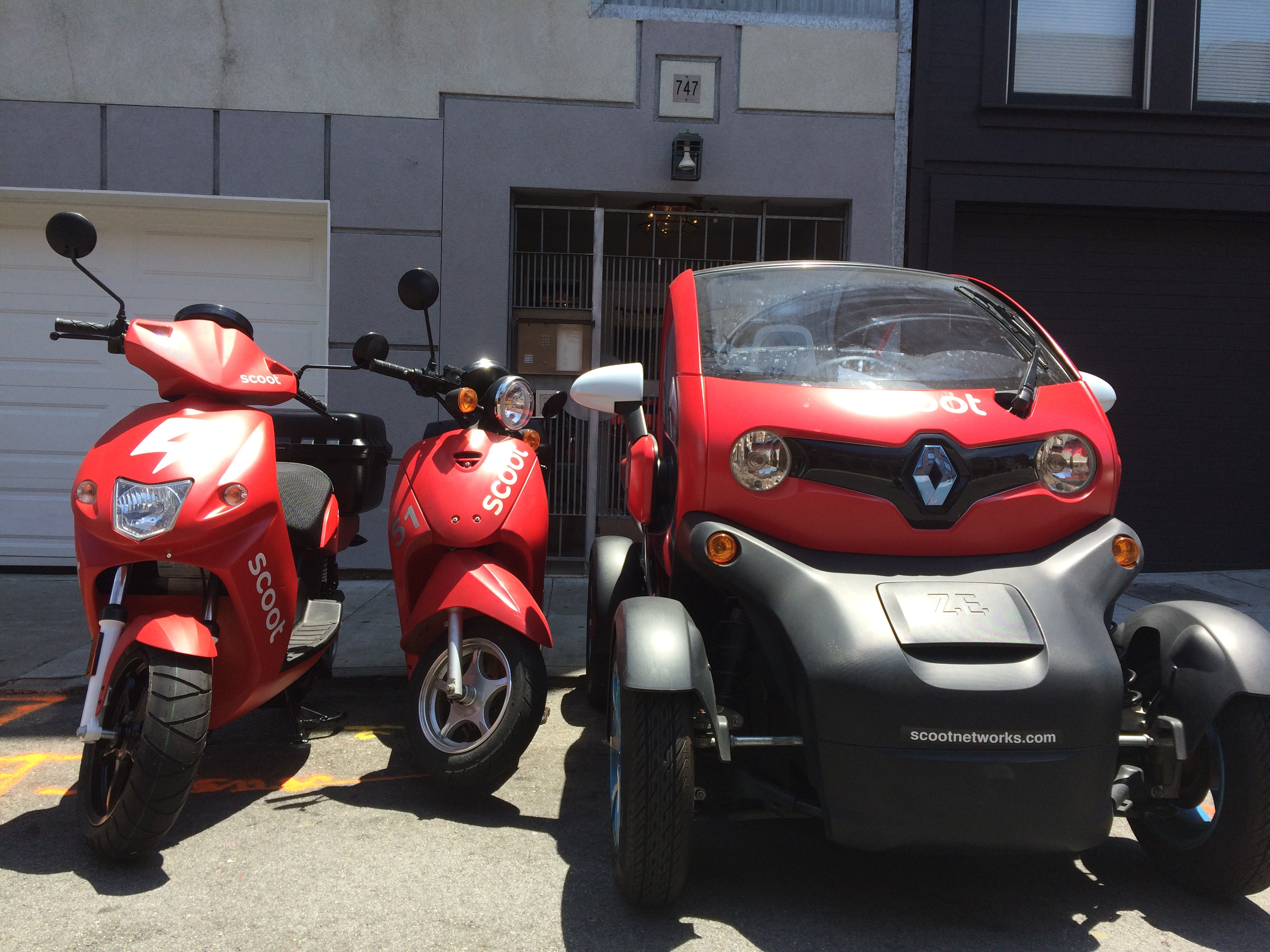
- Scoot Networks Cargo scooter, Classic scooter, and Quad electric car.
- Company type: Subsidiary
- Industry: Public transport
- Founded: 2011; 15 years ago
- Founder: Michael Keating, Matt Ewing and Dan Riegel
- Headquarters: San Francisco, California, United States
- Area served: San Francisco Bay Area, Santiago and Barcelona
- Key people: Michael Keating (former CEO & president)
- Services: Public electric scooter sharing systems
- Parent: Bird Global
- Website: scoot.co

Scoot Networks, also known as just Scoot or Scoot Rides, is an American company which provides public electric scooter and electric bicycle sharing systems. The company is based in San Francisco, California.

== History ==
Scoot was founded in 2011 by Michael Keating. In 2012 he was joined by co-founders Matt Ewing (CCO), and Dan Riegel (CTO). Keating, Scoot's CEO, had a background in transportation software and urban planning, Ewing previously worked with MoveOn advocacy group, and Riegel was a co-founder of EnergyHub.

The company was the first to offer electric vehicle rentals through a smartphone app.

By September 2012, the company had raised $775,000 from investors including Lisa Gansky and Greenstart.

The company opened its service to public beta in San Francisco on September 26, 2012, with 10 electric motor scooters. Their fleet expanded to 50 in late 2012.

In 2014 the company introduced motor scooters with batteries that could be swapped at the curb by a technician in order to recharge the scooters without plugging them in. This enabled customers to end their rental by parking the scooter at the curb rather than in a garage with a power outlet - so called "free floating" vehicle sharing. This began a process that led to SFMTA issuing the world's first on-street parking permit for free-floating electric two-wheelers.

In August 2015 Scoot expanded its fleet to more than 400 with the addition of cargo scooters from German manufacturer GOVECS. The larger vehicles were intended to accommodate larger riders and couriers who rented them to make deliveries.

In October 2015, Scoot added electric mini-cars to its sharing service in partnership with Nissan and Renault. Marketed as Scoot Quads, the cars were Renault Twizy heavy quadracycles available for the first time in the United States as a pilot project.

In 2016, the company received additional funding, primarily from Mahindra Partners and Vision Ridge Capital, for a new fleet of hundreds of electric motor scooters by GenZe. By July 7, 2016, Scoot motor scooters had collectively accumulated over 1,000,000 miles of riding.

In June 2017, the company added Kunal Bhasin on the executive team as CTO to scale technology and product.

In November 2017, indicated its intentions to expand and include additional cities beyond San Francisco.

The company expanded to Barcelona in May 2018 with 500 electric motorbikes and the addition of bike sharing to its services with 1,000 electric bikes.

The company expanded to Santiago, Chile in October 2018 with electric stand-on scooters and later electric bicycles.

In October 2018, Scoot and competitor Skip were the only two companies granted permits by the City of San Francisco to operate shared, electric stand-on scooters in the city.

In July, 2019, after serving hundreds of thousands of riders with millions of rides, Scoot and its 200 employees were acquired by Bird, a competitor, for an undisclosed value. Scoot Rides became a wholly owned subsidiary of Bird. In December 2023, Bird filed for Chapter 11 bankruptcy. The company has plans to restructure and sell some of its assets to some of its existing lenders.

== Services ==
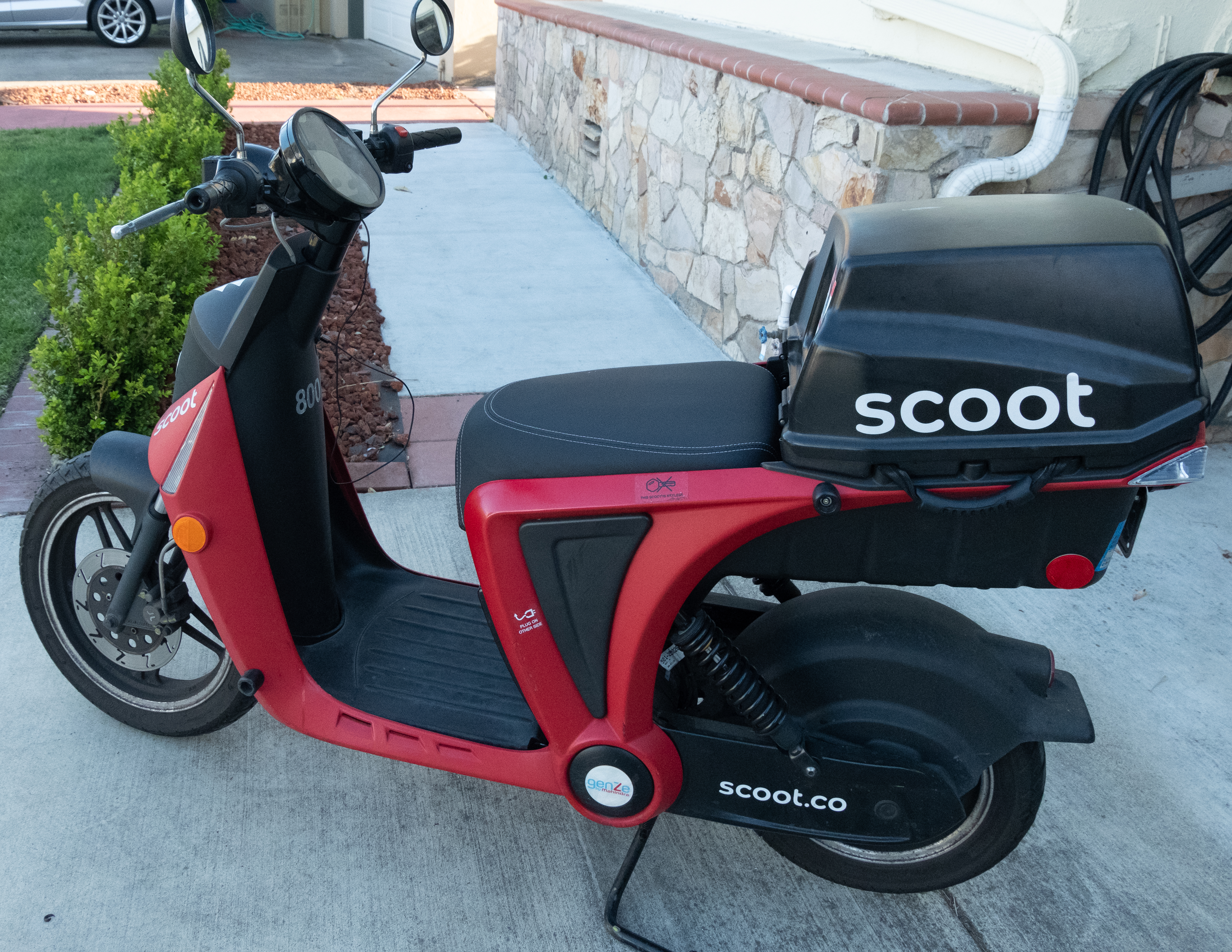
GenZe 2.0 Electric Scooter utilized by Scoot Network fleet.

Scoot provides an online network for sharing electric scooters, electric bikes, electric motorbikes, and electric cars, which are also owned and maintained by the company. The service has been referred to by the media as the "Zipcar for scooters". Unlike Zipcar, most Scoot vehicles are used for short, one-way trips within the city, typically under 20 minutes and under 4 miles in distance. They are usually parked on the street throughout the city rather than in specific garages, and are accessed through a smartphone app rather than an RFID card.

In August 2018, the company was also chosen as one of the providers of San Francisco's scooter-sharing system using dockless electric kick scooters.

In August 2019, Los Angeles Times criticized the company for not providing services to the residents of Tenderloin and Chinatown. The San Francisco Examiner reported that neighborhood residents had requested that Scoot not offer service on especially crowded blocks of their neighborhoods.

The service utilizes GPS to track the vehicles. Riders of scooters are required to have a valid driver's license, but not a motorcycle license. Riders are provided insurance by Scoot Networks. Each motor scooter has helmets stored in their cargo bin for the rider's usage.

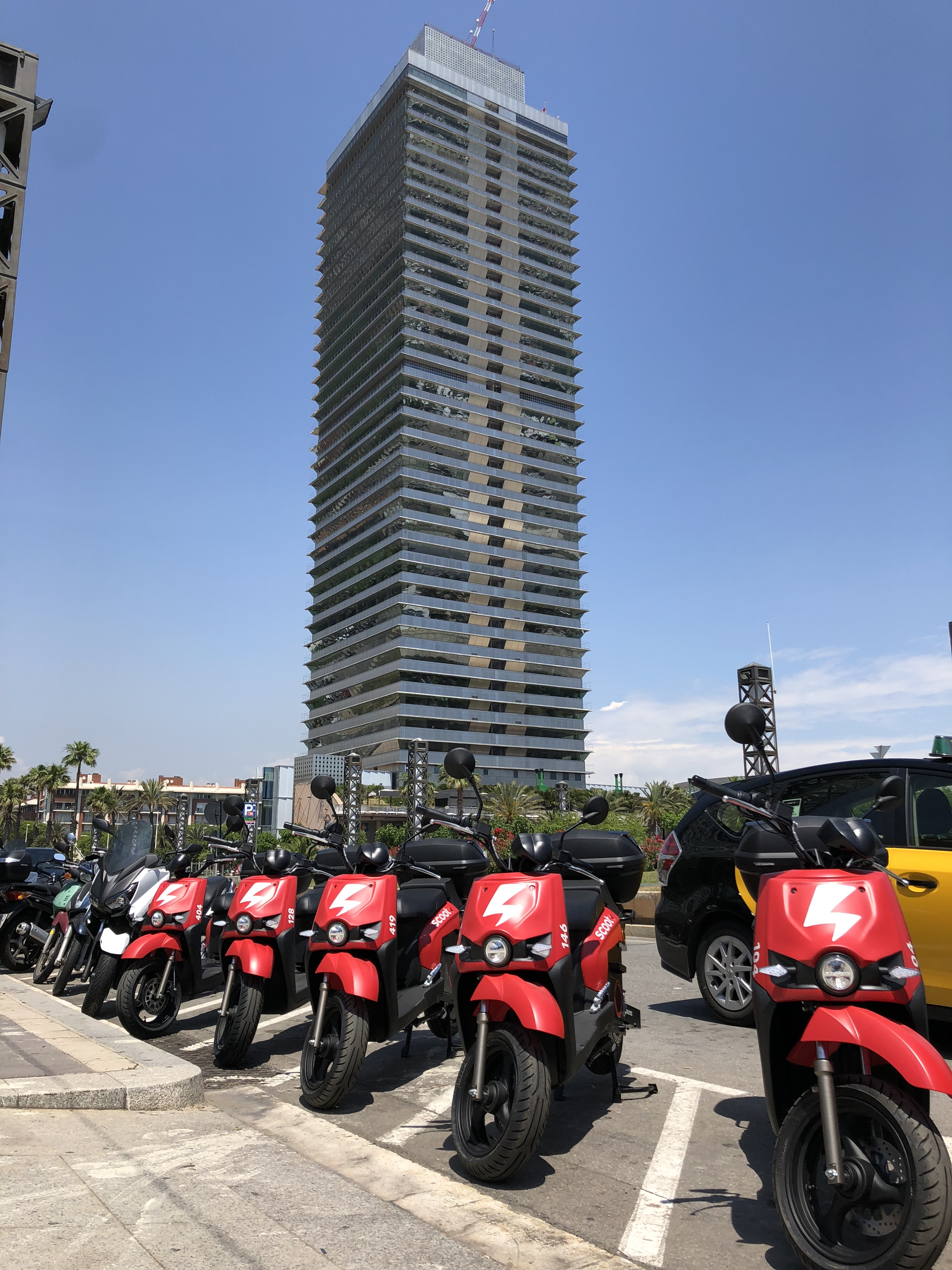
Scoot electric motorbikes in Barcelona.

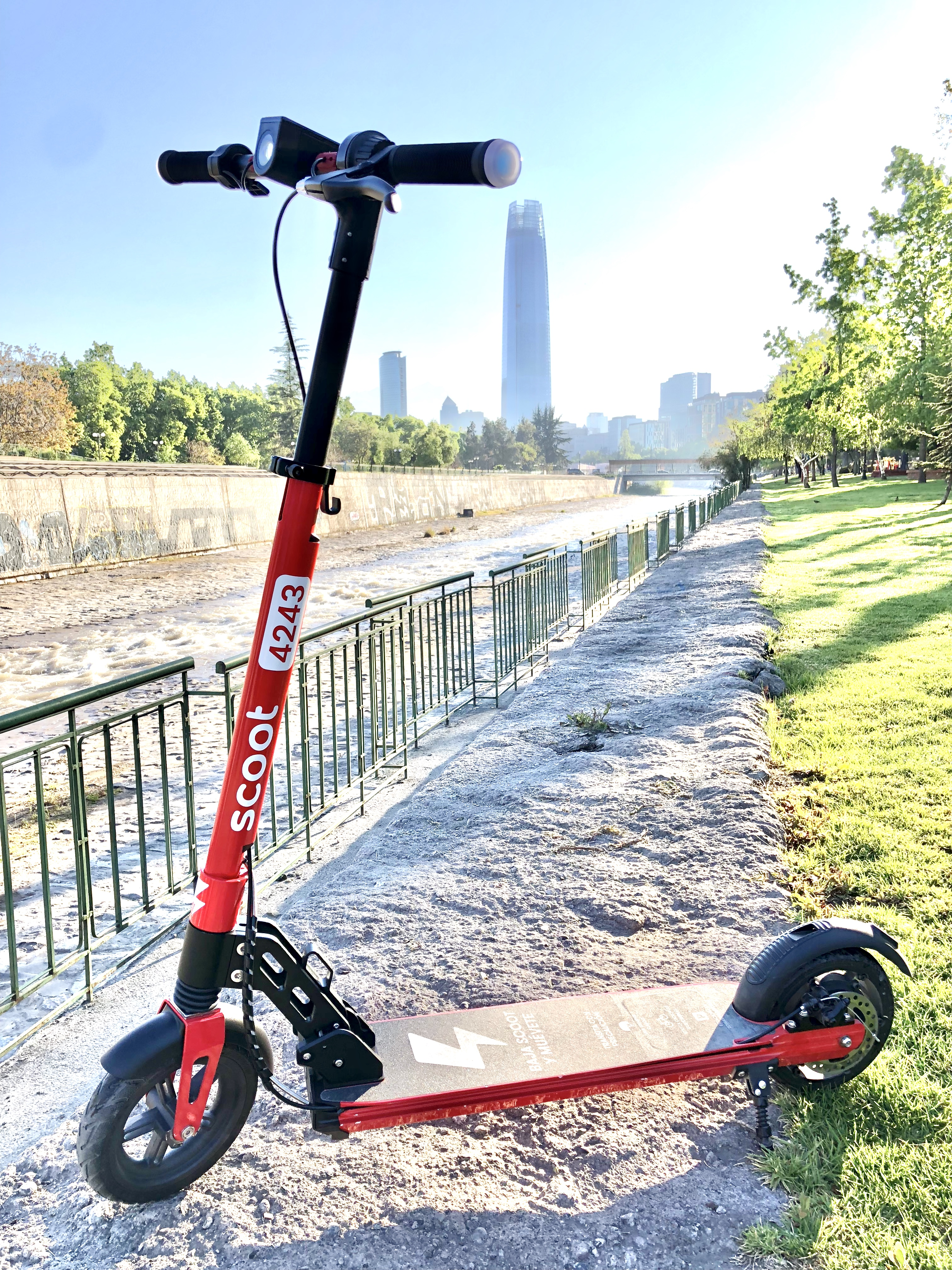
Scoot electric kick scooter in Santiago de Chile.

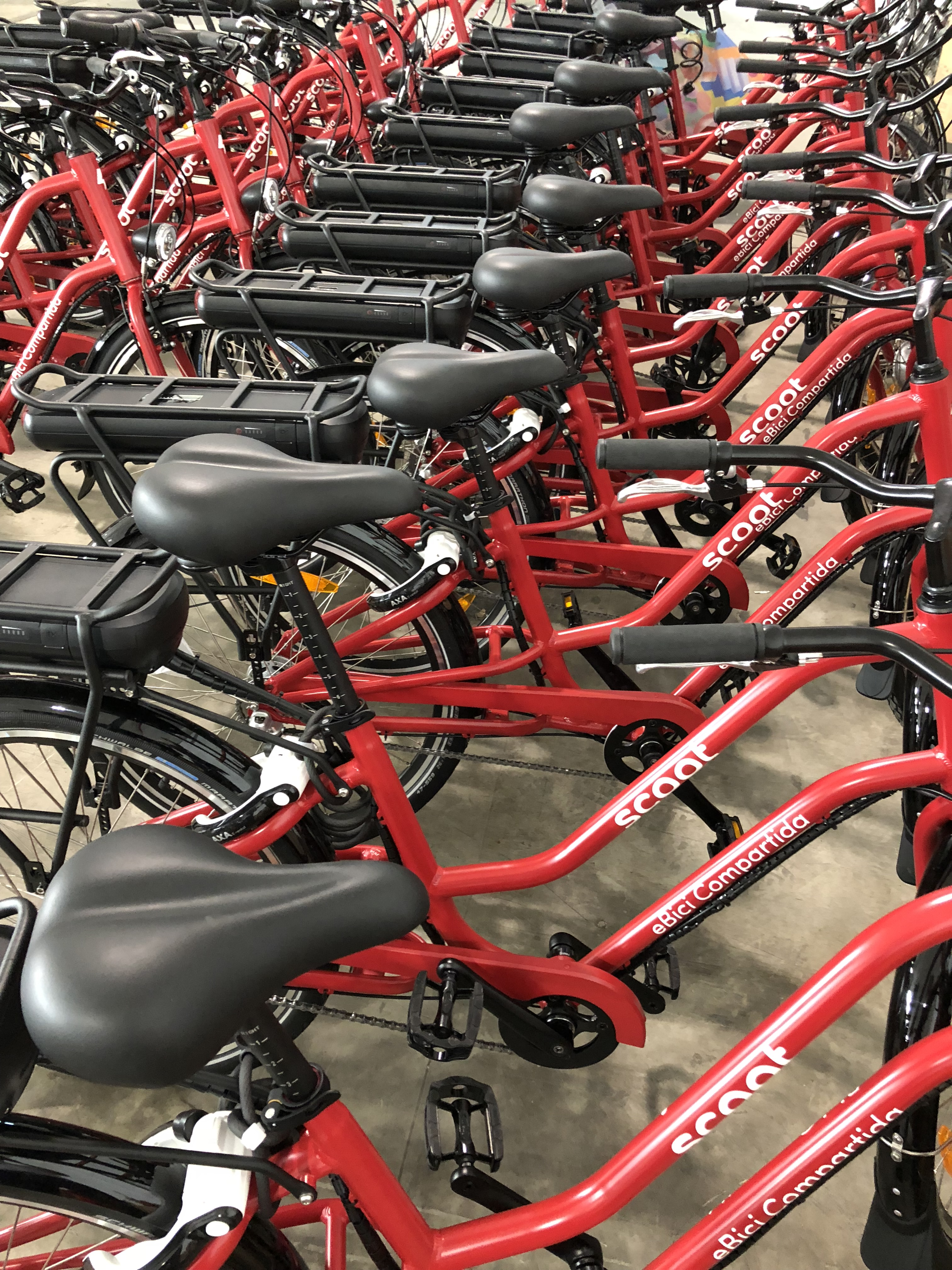
Scoot Networks e-bikes in Barcelona.

=== Pricing ===
The prices of the most popular products are as following, currently as of October 2018 (in US-Dollars):

- Scoots (electric mopeds): starting from $4
- Kicks (electric scooters): starting from $1

=== Target audience ===
The target audience is 18- 45-year-old users, who have access to the scoot mobile app via their smartphone.

== Operations ==
Scoot Rides' headquarters are located in San Francisco, California. Scoot directly employed over 100 people in San Francisco, including engineers, designers, mechanics, customer service staff, and managers. Scoot's European headquarters was in Barcelona where the company employed more than 50 managers, marketers, customer service staff, mechanics, and other technicians. Scoot's Latin America headquarters was in Santiago, Chile where the company employed more than 30 managers, marketers, customer service staff, and technicians.

== Fleet ==
In San Francisco, Scoot Rides utilized electric scooters made by several different manufactures including GOVECS and GenZe, a company owned by the Mahindra Group, whose private-equity business, Mahindra Partners, has invested in Scoot. The company also offered quadracycles from Renault and various electric stand-scooters before being acquired by Bird and switching to Bird's scooters.

In Barcelona, the company utilized electric scooters by Spanish company Silence and electric bicycles made for the company by Taioku.

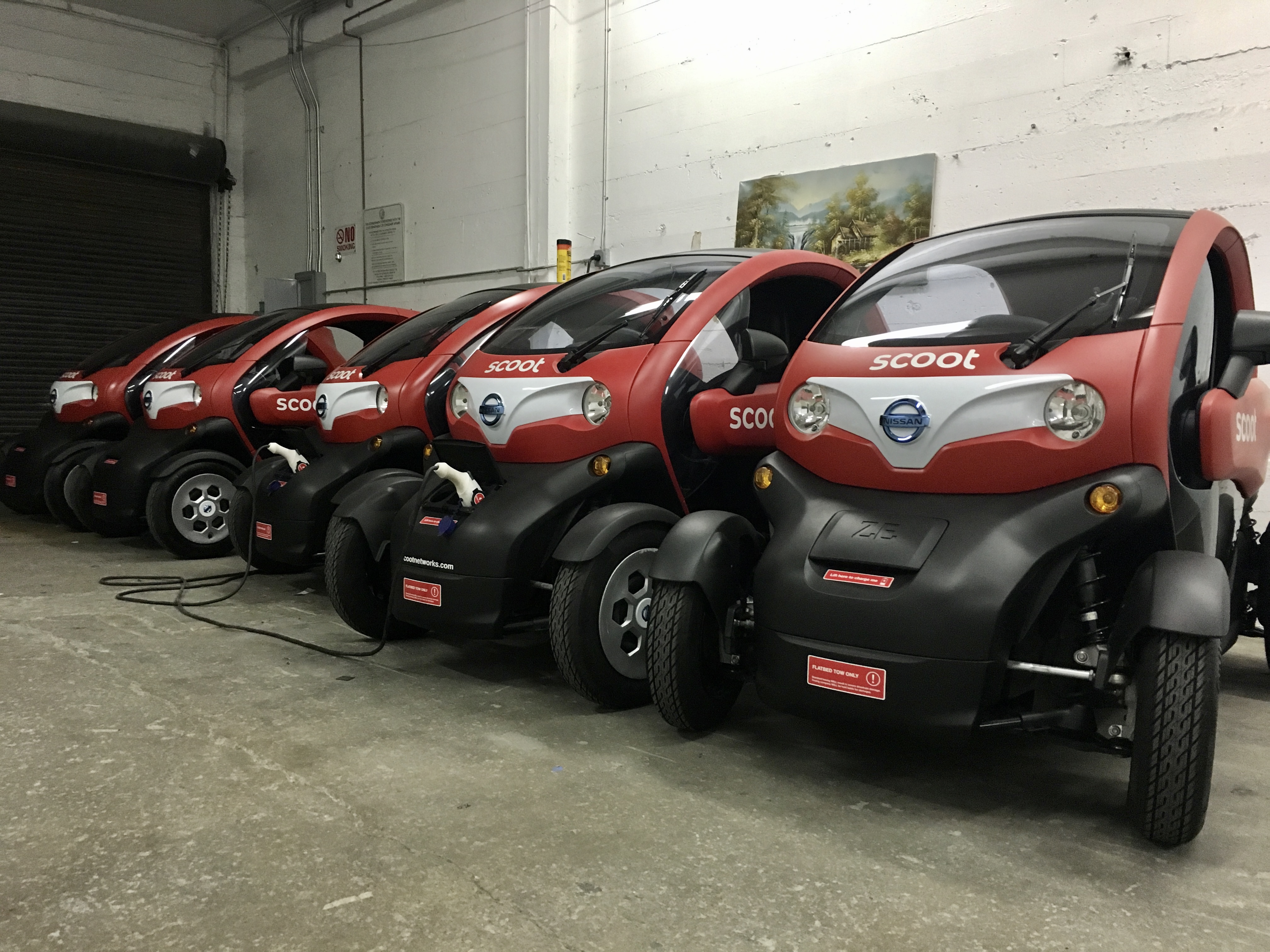
Scoot Quads charging.

In Santiago the company offered electric scooters and electric bicycles.
