= Bird Global =

Dockless scooter-sharing provider

Bird Global, Inc.

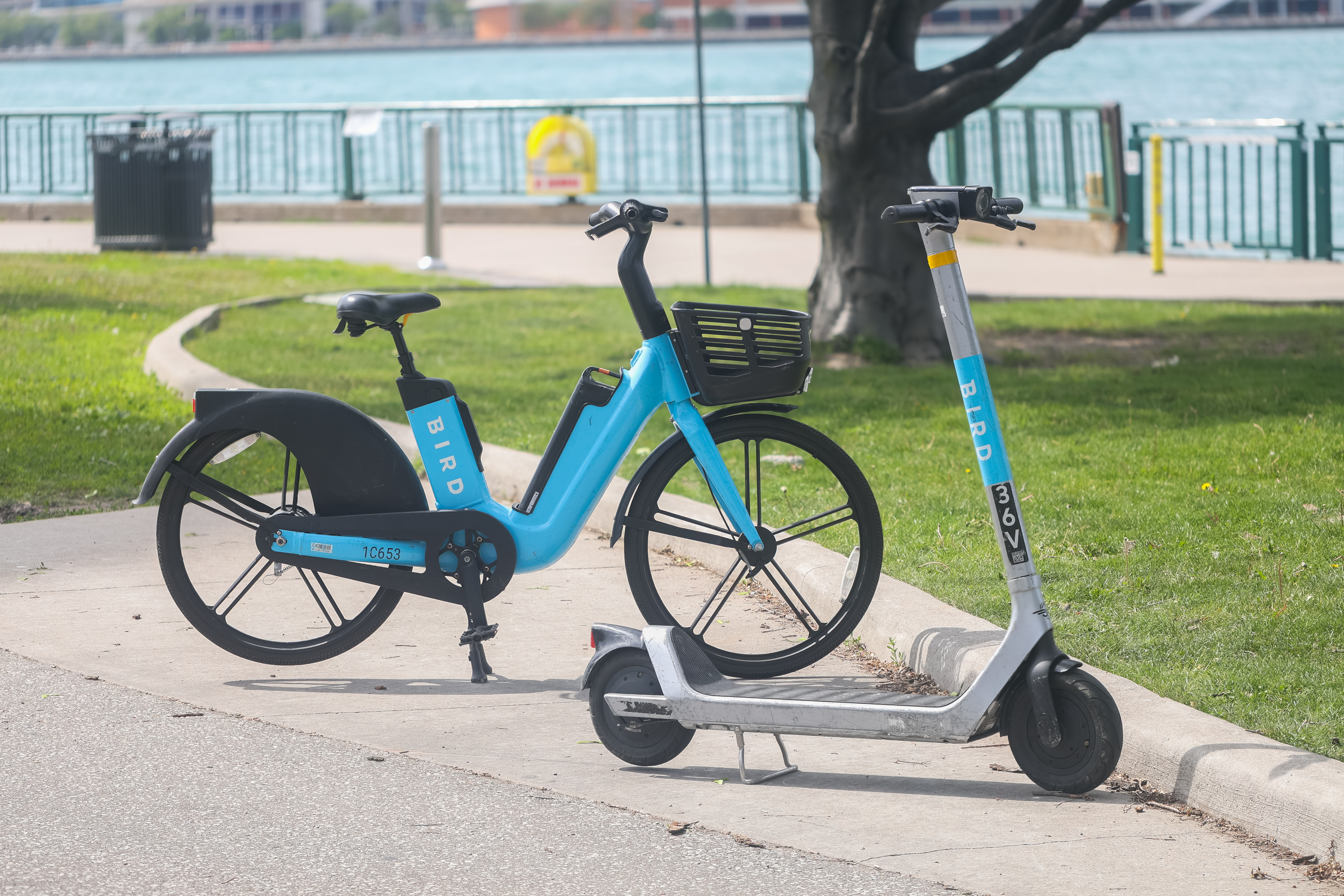
- Bird Global scooter and bicycle at riverfront, Windsor, Ontario, Canada. May 30, 2025
- Type: Private (2017-2021; 2024-present); Public (2021-2024)
- Traded as: OTC Pink: BRDSQ (2023-2024); NYSE: BRDS (2021-2023)
- Industry: Dockless electric scooter sharing
- Founded: September 1, 2017; 9 years ago in Santa Monica, California, US
- Headquarters: 392 NE 191st Street #20388 Miami, FL 33179, U.S. (25.950170, -80.193167)
- Area served: Europe; Middle East; North America
- Revenue: ▲US$205 million (2021)
- Operating income: ▼US$−220 million (2021)
- Net income: ▲US$−196 million (2021)
- Total assets: ▲US$597 million (2021)
- Total equity: ▲US$321 million (2021)
- Number of employees: 302 (December 2022)
- Parent: Third Lane Mobility Inc.
- Subsidiaries: Scoot

Bird Global, Inc., is a micromobility company based in Miami, Florida. Founded in September 2017, Bird has distributed electric scooters designed for short-term rental to over 350 cities. In April 2024, it was acquired by Third Lane Mobility to avoid bankruptcy.

== History ==
Bird was founded in September 2017 by Travis VanderZanden, formerly an executive at Lyft and at Uber. It had its Series A round of funding in February 2018, raising $15 million led by Craft Ventures; this was followed by a Series B round in March for $100 million, led by Index Ventures and Valor Equity Partners, and a venture round in May for $150 million from Sequoia Capital, becoming the fastest company to ever reach the $1 billion "unicorn" valuation. In June 2018, Bird raised an additional $300 million, valuing the company at $2 billion.

In September 2018, Bird claimed 10 million rides.

In October 2018, Bird announced its Bird Zero vehicle. The Bird Zero was designed for ride sharing with "more battery life for longer range, better lighting for increased visibility, and enhanced durability for a longer life-span."

In November 2018, Bird released the Bird Platform, a program based on the company's mobile app and Bird Zero vehicles that allowed independent operators to use Bird's infrastructure to run their own fleet of shared, branded electric scooters.

In January 2019 Axios reported that Bird was raising $300 million in new funding led by Fidelity as an extension of its C funding round.

On June 12, 2019, Scoot Networks was acquired for an undisclosed value as a wholly owned subsidiary of Bird. The deal was expected to be valued at around $25 million in a combination of cash and stock. The acquisition was to allow Bird to operate shared electric scooters in San Francisco.

In November 2019, Bird launched the "Helmet Selfie" safety feature to incentivize riders into wearing helmets when using Bird vehicles. Users can submit a self-portrait photo of themselves wearing a helmet through the app, and receive future ride credits.

Bird initially responded to the 2020 coronavirus pandemic by increasing cleaning and sanitizing efforts in March 2020. Later that month, Bird scaled down operations (reportedly even suspending them within all markets), and terminated around 40% of its then about 1060 employees in a group Zoom meeting. The company halted operations in six US cities (San Francisco, San Jose, Sacramento, Portland, Miami, and Coral Gables), as well as European markets, including Annecy, Antwerp, Barcelona, Berlin, Bordeaux, Cologne, Frankfurt, Hamburg, Krakow, Lisbon, Lyon, Madrid, Marseille, Munich, Paris, Rimini, Sevilla, Stockholm, Torino, Verona, and Vienna.

In September 2023, Bird acquired San Francisco-based competitor Spin from TIER for $19 million. Bird was also forced to delist from the New York Stock Exchange during this month due to its low stock price, having a total market capitalization of only $7 million.

In December 2023, Bird filed for Chapter 11 bankruptcy in the US. Its Canadian and European activities are not part of the bankruptcy. The company has plans to restructure and sell some of its assets to some of its existing lenders.

In 2024, Bird avoided the bankruptcy and restructured under a new parent company, Third Lane Mobility. The company is adopting a more sustainable approach by focusing on regulator-friendly operations and limiting its fleet size to avoid past expansion issues.

== User collaborations ==
=== Chargers ===
Bird scooters are charged by gig workers, private contractors who sign up to become Chargers. The company sends approved Chargers charging equipment and pays them to charge scooters overnight then place them at designated "nests" throughout the company's service area in the morning. Charging can become competitive, with Chargers in some markets using vans and other creative means to pick up scooters all over the city.

== Controversies ==
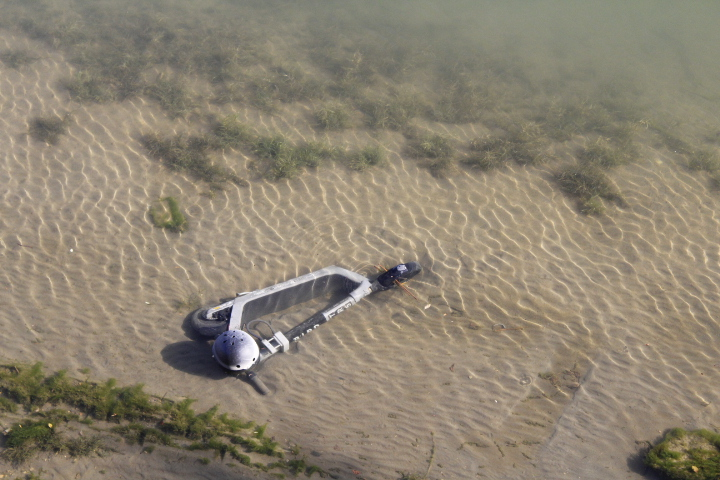
A Bird scooter, dumped in South Saskatchewan River in Saskatoon, Saskatchewan, Canada.

=== Putting franchisees into debt ===
When Bird began marketing its franchise opportunities to operations staff and fleet managers, it ended up putting some workers $40,000 in debt. The franchisees do not own the scooters they obtain from Bird and are liable for repayments even when scooters are lost or stolen.

=== Milwaukee, Wisconsin ===
Scooters were initially banned in Milwaukee when Bird Rides Inc. started their scooter business without government permission. Wisconsin's governor Tony Evers signed a bill on July 11, 2019, regulating scooters. The Milwaukee Common Council and Mayor Tom Barrett banned Bird Scooters from operating in the city and passed an ordinance giving law enforcement permission to impound scooters. They also sued the scooter company.

In May 2019 Bird reached a settlement with the city of Milwaukee regarding the lawsuit. The following August, Milwaukee's Department of Public Works announced it would allow Bird to operate in the city again.

=== San Francisco, California ===
In September 2019, the city of San Francisco announced the four permit holders that would be able to operate. Operators were able to submit an application and the city down-selected based on several criteria, including safety. Bird was one of the selected operators through its subsidiary Scoot.

=== Seattle, Washington ===
Seattle, Washington, initially banned scooter shares, and city law barred the use of motorized foot scooters on sidewalks and bicycle lanes. Mayor Jenny Durkan announced in May 2019 that her administration would soon begin crafting a pilot program for scooter sharing. In September 2020, the Seattle City Council approved legislation allowing free-floating rentable scooters, which riders may use in bike lanes and on roads, and the city's transportation department planned to issue permits to three companies for a total of 1,500 scooters, possibly growing to 6,000. In 2026, Lime became the only operator in the city's bike- and scooter-share program following the exit of competitors including Bird.

=== Accidents and deaths ===
Bird electric scooters have been involved in some accidents and deaths.

=== Overstating revenue ===
In November 2022, the company admitted to overstating the revenue it received from its shared electric scooters for more than two years. In an audit of financial statements, Bird found that it was recognizing unpaid customer rides from their preloaded "wallet" balances as revenue. The company pledged to correct its financial reports "as soon as practicable", and agreed that a broader review of its disclosure practices would be required.

== See also ==
- Bolt
- Lime
