= Travis VanderZanden =

American businessman

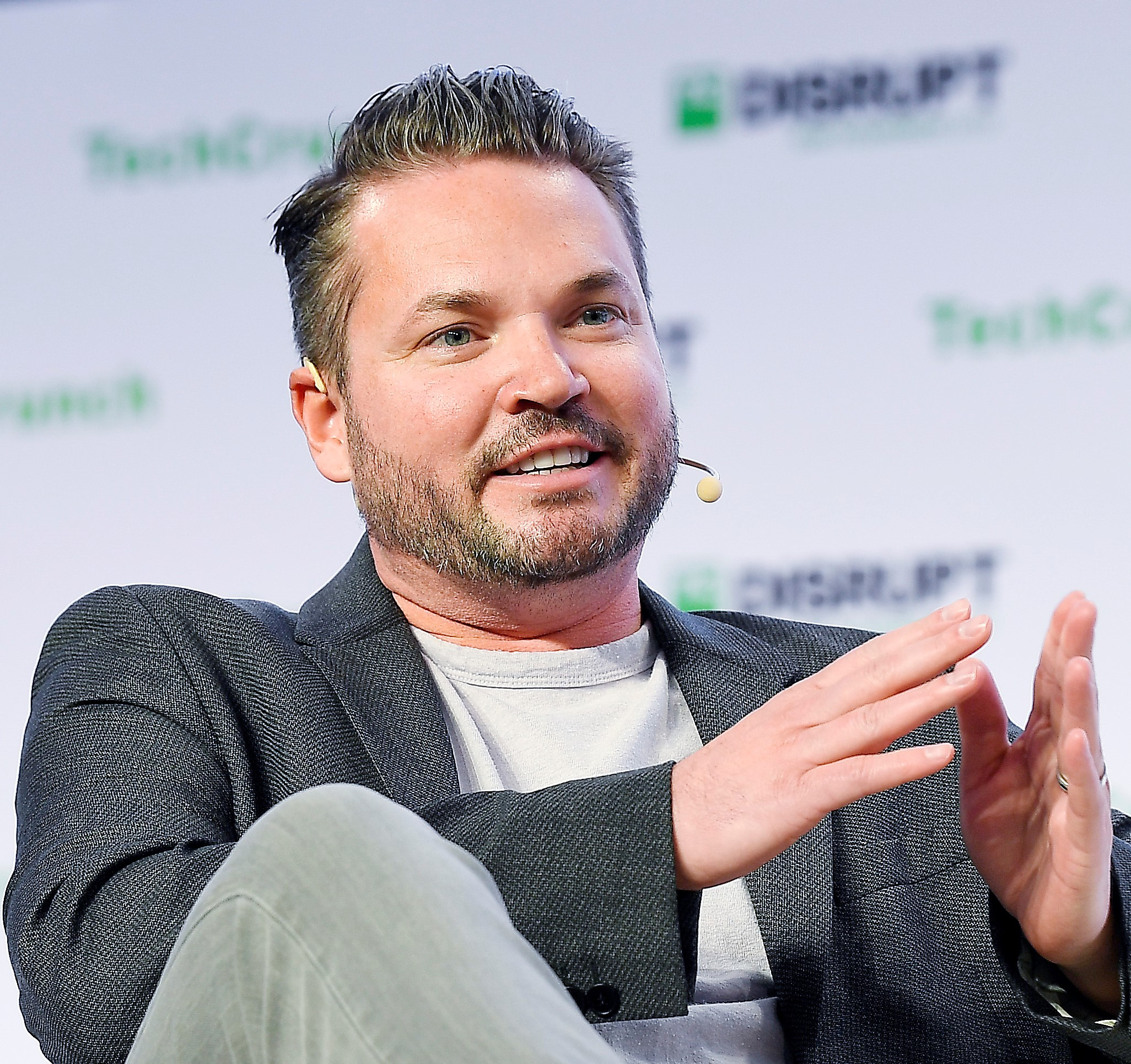
- VanderZanden speaking in 2019
- Born: 1979 (age 46–47); Appleton, Wisconsin, US
- Education: University of Wisconsin–Eau Claire (BBA); University of Southern California (MBA)
- Occupation: Entrepreneur
- Known for: Founder of Bird

Travis VanderZanden (born 1979) is an American businessman and the founder and former CEO of Bird, a scooter sharing service owned by Third Lane Mobility. Before founding Bird, VanderZanden was Chief Operating Officer at Lyft, then VP of International Growth at Uber.

== Education ==
VanderZanden graduated from Appleton North High School in 1997, he later attended University of Wisconsin–Eau Claire from 1997 to 2002, receiving a Bachelor of Business Administration. He earned a Master of Business Administration from the USC Marshall School of Business in 2007.

== Career ==
=== Early career ===
VanderZanden worked as a product manager at Qualcomm. After leaving Qualcomm, he was Chief Revenue Officer for Yammer from 2009 to 2011, then left to co-found Cherry, an on-demand car-wash service. He was CEO of Cherry until 2013, when the company was acquired by Lyft, and he was brought on as Chief Operating Officer. He left Lyft for Uber in October 2014. Lyft later sued him for allegedly breaking his confidentiality agreement, and the lawsuit was settled for undisclosed terms, with VanderZanden denying any wrongdoing. VanderZanden then left Uber in October 2016.

=== Bird ===
VanderZanden founded Bird in the summer of 2017. The company deployed its first scooters that September, before raising a $15 million Series A round of financing in February, 2018. In October 2018, Bird released its latest edition of the scooter, Bird Zero, which was designed and built in partnership with Okai. As of 2019, the company is now in 120 cities across the globe. The company has taken in $415 million in funding. To date, Bird has provided more than 10 million rides. The company currently receives $1.27 on every Bird ride taken, which is inclusive of all costs. VanderZanden was a speaker at TechCrunch's Disrupt SF in October 2019.

During the COVID-19 mass layoff of Bird employees, VanderZanden was criticized for not informing employees in person about their dismissal, rather, delegating the task to the company's Chief Communications Officer.

In September 2023, Bird was delisted from the New York Stock Exchange because of its low stock price. Its $7 million market capitalization is less than the value of the $22 million Miami mansion that VanderZanden bought in 2021. In 2024, Bird was acquired by Third Lane Mobility to avoid bankruptcy.

== Personal life ==
In 2020, VanderZanden purchased a home in Bel Air formerly owned by Trevor Noah.
