= Blind Homer with His Student Guide =

Bronze sculpture by Moses Jacob Ezekiel

Homer
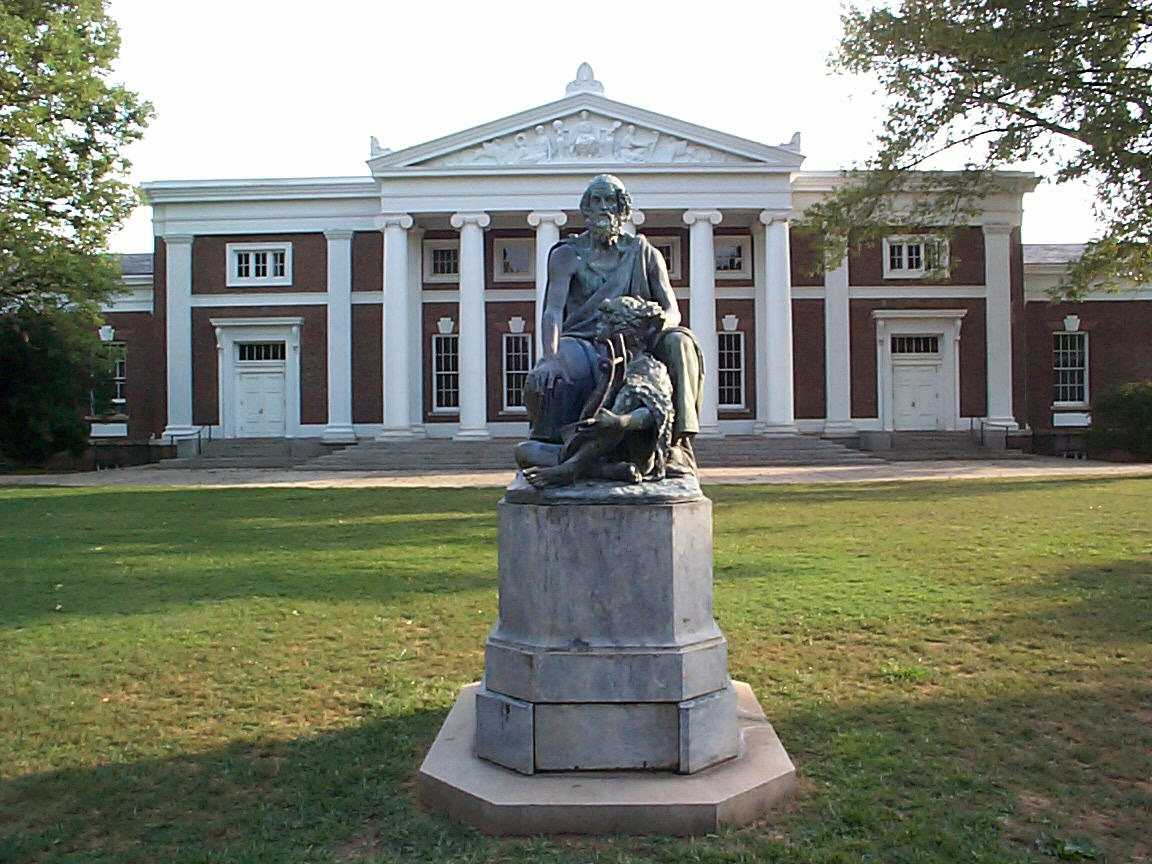
- Artist: Moses Jacob Ezekiel
- Year: 1907
- Type: Bronze
- Dimensions: 170 cm × 90 cm × 140 cm (67 in × 35 in × 55 in)
- Location: Charlottesville; 38°2′00″N 78°30′27″W
- Owner: University of Virginia

Blind Homer With His Student Guide is a bronze sculpture by Moses Jacob Ezekiel in the likeness of the blind poet Homer, author of the Iliad, accompanied by a student guide. Ezekiel completed the statue in 1907 on a commission from John Woodruff Simpson as a gift for Amherst College, his alma mater. For reasons unknown the gift was refused, and Thomas Nelson Page, a Virginia alumnus who was active in the UVA Alumni Association, stepped in to secure the gift of the statue to UVA instead. Ezekiel completed the work in his Rome studio and donated a five foot tall black marble pedestal upon which the statue was originally installed.

The statue is installed on The Lawn, in the grass to the north of Old Cabell Hall.

== Damage and restoration ==
In January 2019, the statue was damaged and the lyre held by the "student guide" was apparently stolen. Subsequent investigation found the lyre on the ground next to the statue. Charles McCance, the university associate Vice President for communications, said that "the original mounts were severely corroded … It would not have taken much force to remove the lyre.". The statue was restored in October 2019, returning the lyre to its original position, replacing its missing strings, reinforcing a hand that had become "wobbly," and adding a layer of protective wax to the statue.
