= GenZe (company) =

Brand of electric bicycles and scooters

Mahindra GenZe
- Trade name: GenZe
- Company type: Subsidiary
- Industry: Electric bicycles and scooters
- Defunct: June 2020
- Headquarters: Fremont, California, U.S.
- Parent: Mahindra Group
- Website: www.genze.com

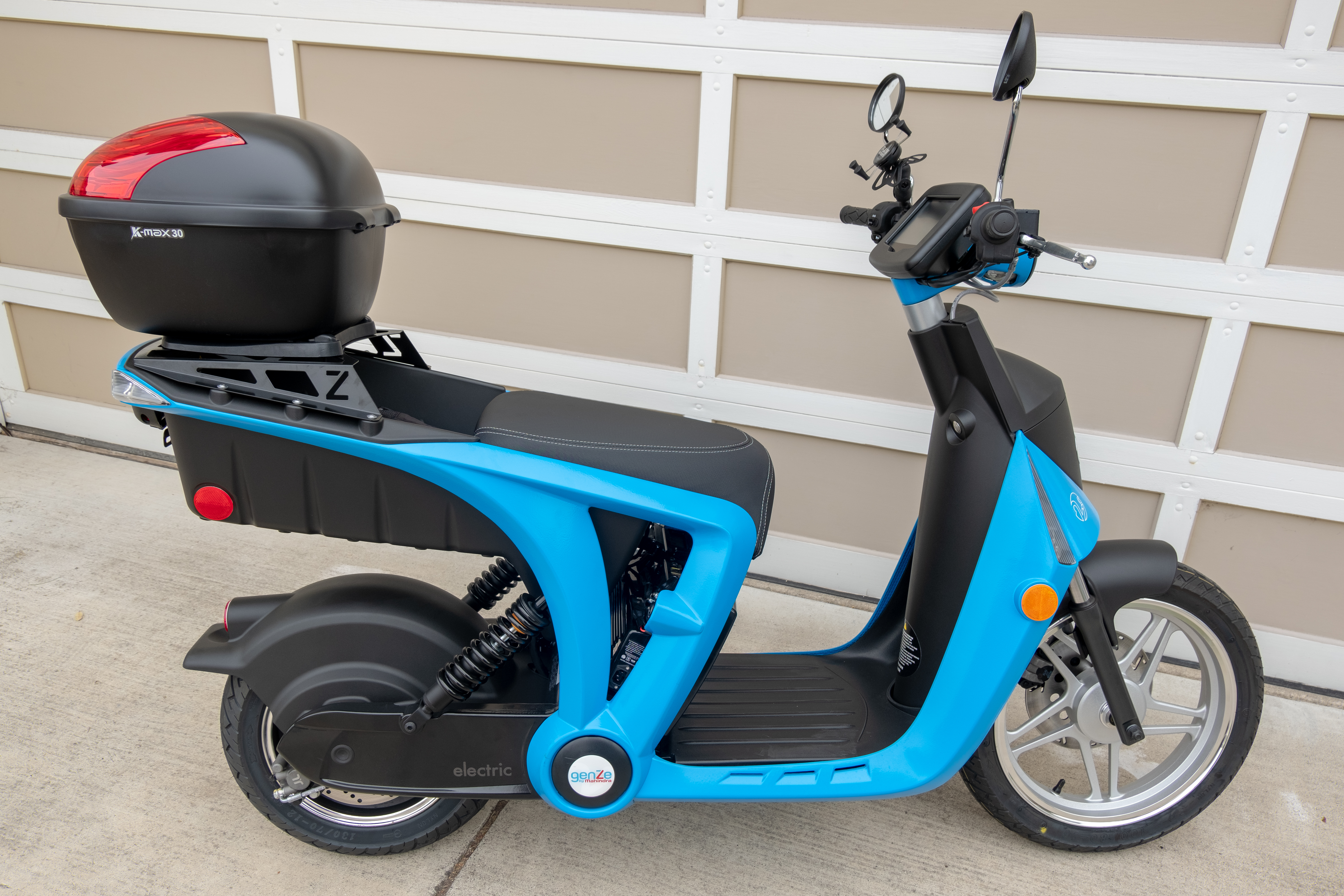
GenZe 2.0s Electric Scooter sold to consumers with a K-Max 30 top-box

Mahindra GenZe, doing business as GenZe and also known as GenZe by Mahindra, was a brand of electric bicycles and scooters. It was a subsidiary of the Mahindra Group of India.

== History ==
In 2013, GenZe introduced their first electric bicycle and electric scooter. The name GenZe was short for Generation Zero Emissions, which was a reference to their products being zero-emissions vehicles.

== Operations ==
GenZe operated as a subsidiary of the Mahindra Group. Its headquarters were located in Fremont, California. GenZe's products were manufactured, hand-assembled, and road-tested in Ann Arbor, Michigan.

In June 2020, it was announced that GenZe would be closing down its operations.

== Products ==
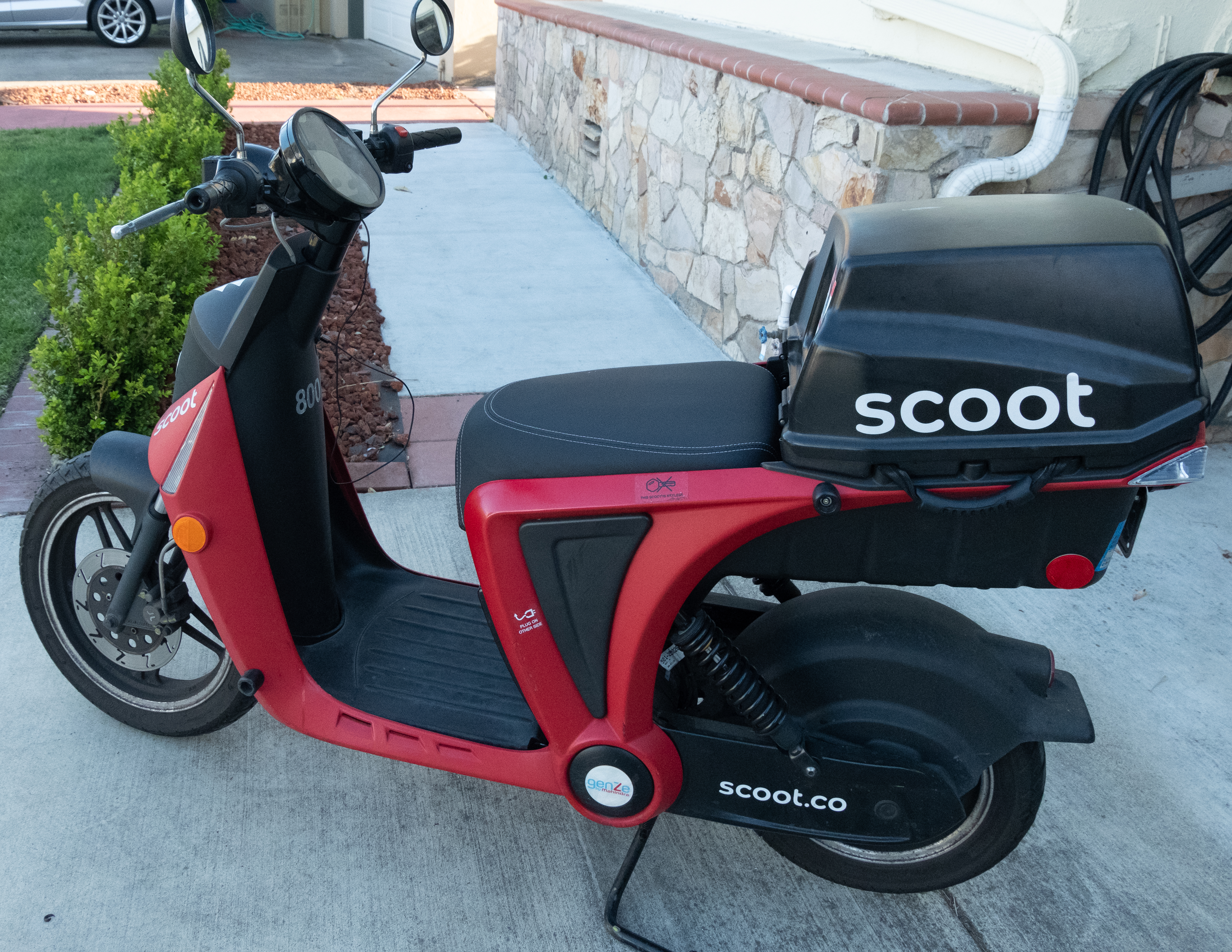
GenZe 2.0 Electric Scooter utilized by Scoot Network fleet

GenZe designed and manufactured electric bicycles and electric scooters intended for consumers and corporate fleets.

=== Electric bicycles ===
Their electric bicycles were available through the Ford GoBike public bicycle-sharing system, and the Bike Solar Oakland program in Oakland, California.

=== Electric scooters ===
The GenZe electric scooters were introduced in 2015, and were delivered to consumers in December 2015. They were utilized by Postmates delivery service. They were also available through the Scoot Networks public scooter sharing system, which the Mahindra Group's private-equity business had invested in.

== See also ==
- List of electric bicycle brands and manufacturers
- Outline of cycling
- Mahindra Two Wheelers
