= Eleanor M. Fox =

American legal scholar

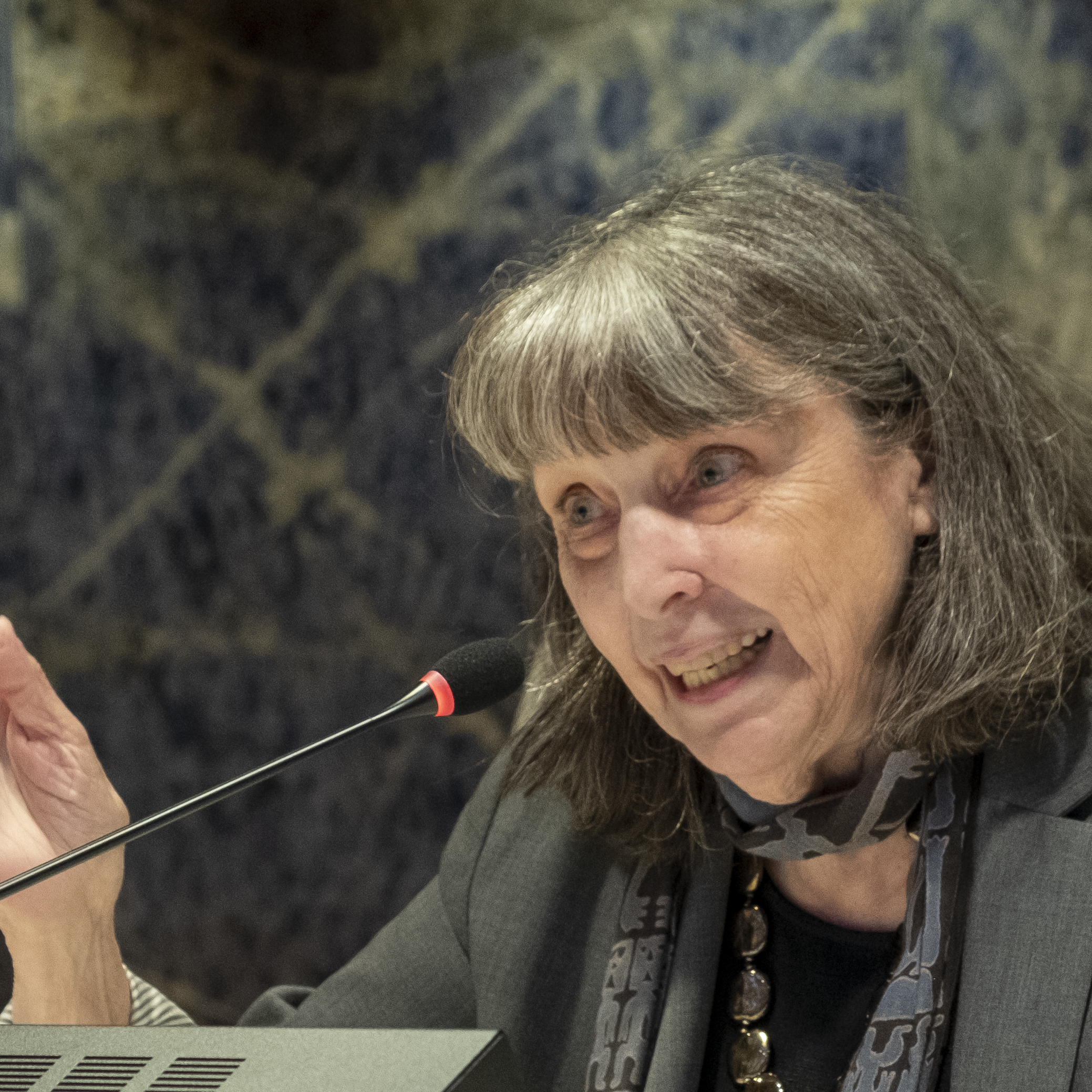
Professor Eleanor Fox, July 2019

Eleanor M. Fox (born 1936) is an American legal scholar and professor emerita at New York University School of Law, known for her work on antitrust and economic development and the special needs of developing countries for economic law attuned to the nations' contexts. She is also a scholar on antitrust and competition law globally, including US antitrust, European Union competition law, the competition law of South Africa, the emerging competition law for continental Africa, globalization, the interface of trade law and competition law, and the connection between markets, inequalities, and poverty. Fox is the Walter J. Derenberg Professor of Trade Regulation Emerita at the New York University School of Law.

== Education and career ==
Fox graduated from Vassar College in 1956, and earned an LLB in 1961 from the New York University School of Law.

Before joining the NYU Law School faculty, she worked as a litigator and advisor in the New York law firm Simpson Thacher & Bartlett. In 1970, she became the first female partner at Simpson Thacher & Bartlett, and was one of the first female partners in the big New York (Wall Street) law firms. In 1976 she joined the faculty of New York University School of Law. In 1978–1979 she served on President Carter's National Commission for the Review of Antitrust Laws and Procedures, and from 1997 to 2000 she served on President Clinton's International Competition Policy Advisory Committee of the US Department of Justice.

Fox acted as the lawyer for the New York-based Heresies Collective during their period of publication activity (1977-1993).

== Publications ==
=== Selected books ===
- Cases and Materials on U.S. Antitrust in Global Context (with Daniel A. Crane and Sean P. Sullivan, West Academic Publishing 5th ed., 2024, 4th ed., 2020, 3d ed., 2012. 2d ed., 2004)
- EU Competition Law: Cases, Text and Context (with Damien Gerard, Edward Elgar Publishing 2nd ed., 2023; 1st ed., 2017)
- Making Markets Work for Africa: Markets, Development, and Competition Law in Sub-Saharan Africa (with Mor Bakhoum, Oxford University Press, 2019)
- Global Issues in Antitrust and Competition Law (with Daniel A. Crane, West Academic Publishing 2nd ed., 2017; 1st ed., 2010)
- Antitrust Stories (ed. with Daniel A. Crane, Foundation Press, 2007)
- Competition Policy and the Transformation of Central Europe (with John Fingleton et al, Centre for Economic Policy Research, 1996)

She also wrote the novel W. L. Esquire (1977), a satire concerning a female lawyer in an all-male corporate environment.

=== Selected articles ===
- "Competition and Inequality, Background Note," for OECD Forum on Competition, held December 2024
- "The Rise of the Antitrust Consensus Against Neoliberalism," ProMarket, Chicago Booth, Stigler Center for the Study of the Economy and the State (2024)
- "Blind Spot: Trade and Competition Law—the Space Between the Silos," 24 German Law Journal 269 (2023)
- Mergers, Antitrust and the China Card, in Research Handbook on Global Merger Control 367 (Ionannis Kokkoris and Nicholas Levy, eds., Edward Elgar Publishing, 2023)
- "Integrating Africa by Competition and Market Policy," 60 Review of Industrial Organization 305 (2022)
- State Restraints in China: A Different Case?, in Wang Xiaoye: The Pioneer of Competition Law in China, Liber Amicorum 187 (Adrian Emch and Wendy Ng, eds., Institute of Competition Law, 2019) (with Deborah Healey)
- "Monopolization and Abuse of Dominance: Why Europe Is Different," 59 Antitrust Bulletin 129 (2014)
- "When the State Harms Competition—The Role for Competition Law," 79 Antitrust Law Journal 769 (2014) (with Deborah Healey)
- "The Battle for the Soul of Antitrust," 75 California Law Review 917 (1987)
- "The Modernization of Antitrust: A New Equilibrium," 66 Cornell Law Review 1140 (1981)

== Recognition ==
Fox was the inaugural Alumna of the Year of NYU's alumnae group Law Women in 2006. She was given an honorary doctorate by Paris Dauphine University in 2009. In 2011 Global Competition Review gave Fox a lifetime achievement award for "substantial, lasting and transformational impact on competition policy and/or practice". In 2017 the Association of American Law Schools gave Fox their Antitrust Lifetime Achievement Award.

Other awards include:

- 2015 – Antitrust Writing Awards: Academic, General Antitrust, Concurrences
- 2014 – Antitrust Law Section Public Service Award, New York State Bar Association
- 2009 – Achievement Award (now Alfred E. Kahn award), American Antitrust Institute
