= Monticello and the University of Virginia in Charlottesville =

UNESCO World Heritage Site
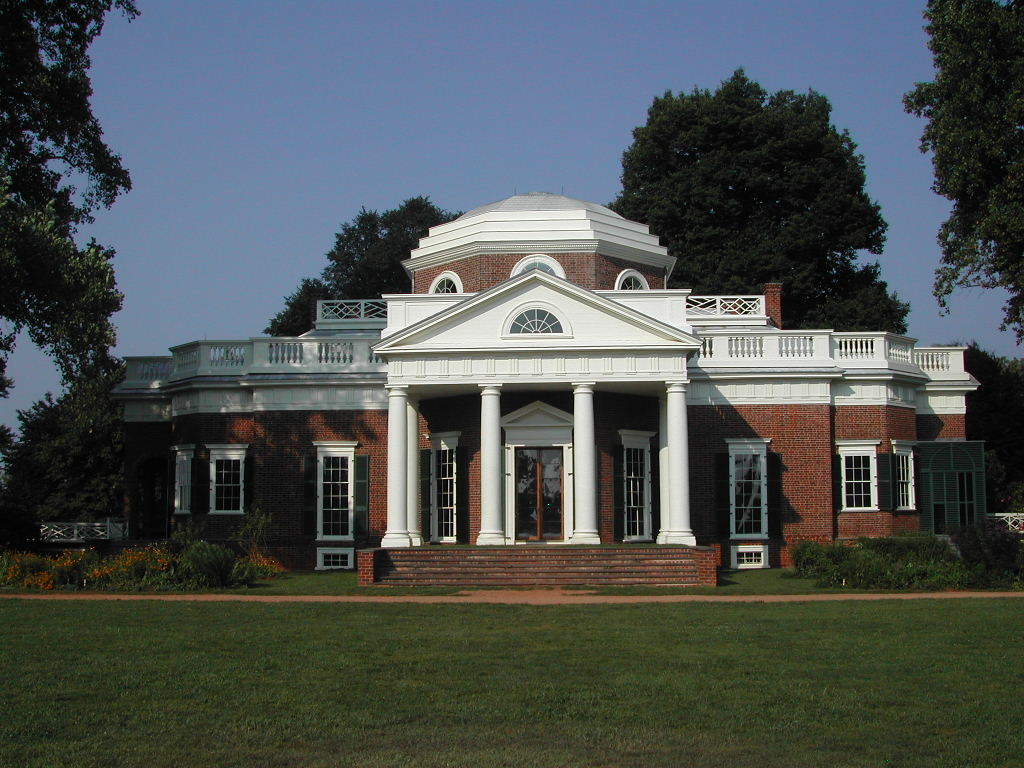
- Location: United States
- Includes: Monticello; Academical Village
- Criteria: (i)(iv)(vi)
- Reference: 442
- Inscription: 1987 (11th Session)
- Area: 795.96 ha (1,966.9 acres)

Monticello and the University of Virginia in Charlottesville is a UNESCO World Heritage Site in the U.S. state of Virginia.

Thomas Jefferson (1743–1826), author of the American Declaration of Independence and third President of the United States, was also a talented architect of neoclassical buildings. He designed Monticello (1769–1809), his plantation home, and his ideal "academical village" (1817–26) situated eight kilometres away in Charlottesville, in central Virginia. The Academical Village still forms the heart of the University of Virginia, and exhibits a unique U-shaped plan dominated by the Rotunda with pavilions, hotels, student rooms, and gardens arrayed in rows to its south. The buildings are excellent and highly personalized examples of Neoclassicism, shown in their relationship to the natural setting and their blending of functionalism and symbolism. Jefferson's use of an architectural vocabulary based upon classical antiquity symbolizes both the aspirations of the new American republic as the inheritor of European tradition and the cultural experimentation that could be expected as the country matured. Both works have drawn international attention from the time of their construction.

== Outstanding Universal Value ==
Jefferson’s Monticello and his Academical Village precinct are notable for the originality of their plans and designs and for the refinement of their proportions and décor. His house at Monticello, with its dome, porticos supported by Doric columns, and cornices and friezes derived from classical Roman buildings, and his Academical Village, with its Rotunda modeled on the Pantheon and its ten pavilions each offering a different lesson in the classical orders and architecture as drawn from published classical models, together invoke the ideals of ancient Rome regarding freedom, nobility, self-determination, and prosperity linked to education and agricultural values. The property satisfies the following criteria of World Heritage Convention:

- Criterion (i): Both Monticello and the University of Virginia reflect Jefferson’s wide reading of classical and later works on architecture and design and also his careful study of the architecture of late 18th-century Europe. As such they illustrate his wide diversity of interests.
- Criterion (iv): With these buildings Thomas Jefferson made a significant contribution to Neoclassicism, the 18th-century movement that adapted the forms and details of classical architecture to contemporary buildings.
- Criterion (vi): Monticello and the key buildings of the University of Virginia are directly and materially associated with the ideas and ideals of Thomas Jefferson. Both the University buildings and Monticello were directly inspired by principles derived from his deep knowledge of classical architecture and philosophy.

== History ==
In 1809, Jefferson finished the rebuilding of Monticello begun in 1796. He transformed the original eight room Palladian villa, with its tall two-story portico, into a 21-room house designed in the fashionable Neoclassical style he saw in France. The front elevation was a deceptively low horizontal composition centered on a pavilion dominated by a columned portico and a low dome. The renovation kept most of the rooms of the original house, but more than doubled its depth. The integration of the buildings into the natural landscape, the originality of the plan and design, and the refined proportions and decor make Monticello an outstanding example of a neoclassical work of art. Jefferson, an avid horticulturist, also created the gardens at Monticello, which were a botanic showpiece, a source of food, and an experimental laboratory of ornamental and useful plants from around the world.

The University of Virginia was Jefferson's most ambitious and last architectural undertaking. This project departs from preexisting British or American college planning schemes. Jefferson intended that the university design express educational ideals both encyclopedic and democratic, a fitting legacy for his beloved Virginia and the new United States of America. Jefferson founded the University of Virginia in 1819 as the first nonsectarian university in the United States. He intended the institution to produce leaders well-versed in public service and practical affairs. The University of Virginia is considered one of Jefferson’s greatest achievements, both for its architecture and innovative nature. The first university to use an elective course system, its most recognizable physical symbol is the Rotunda, which Jefferson designed to contain the library and be the heart of the campus. Standing at the north end of the University’s Lawn with its flanking faculty pavilions and student rooms, the Rotunda is based on the Pantheon in Rome. Its Lawn continues to serve as a model for centralized green areas on university campuses. Reconstructed in 1899, after being severely damaged in a fire, the Rotunda retains many of its original Jeffersonian design elements and remains a physical embodiment of his illustrious legacy.

== See also ==
- Thomas Jefferson
- University of Virginia
- Charlottesville, VA
