= Spin (company) =

American bike and scooter sharing company

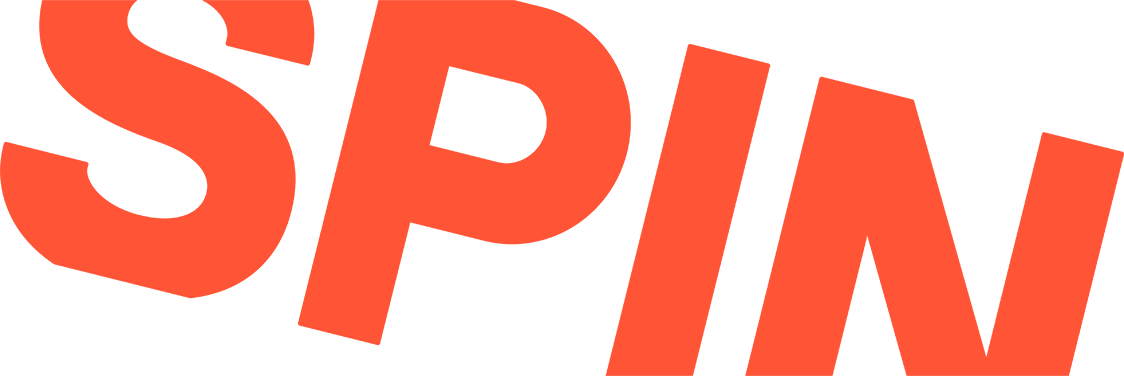

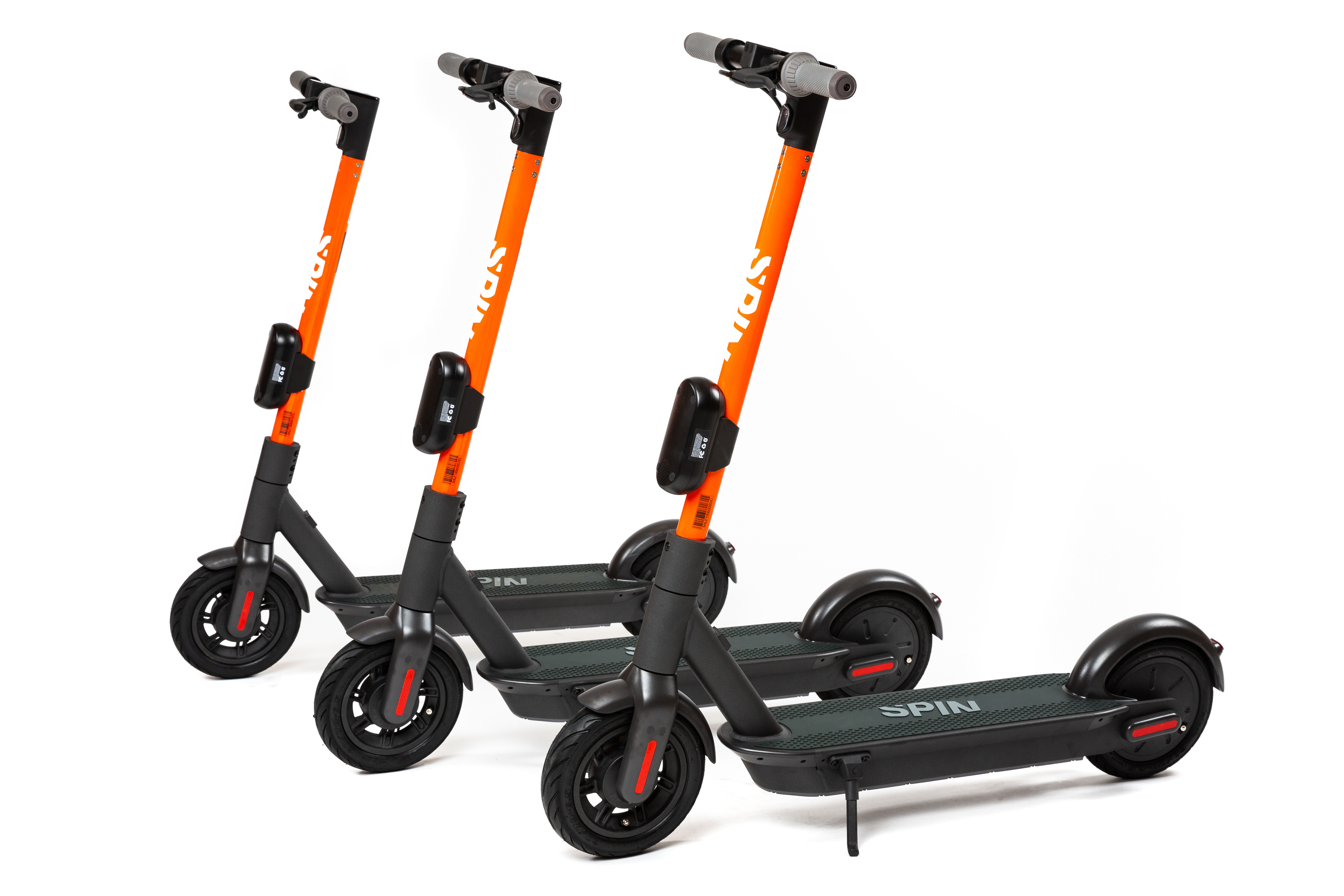
- Spin Scooters (2020)
- Formerly: Skinny Labs, Inc.
- Industry: Bicycle-sharing and scooter-sharing
- Founded: October 2016; 9 years ago
- Founders: Euwyn Poon; Derrick Ko; Zaizhuang Cheng
- Headquarters: San Francisco, California, US
- Key people: Philip Reinckens (CEO)
- Parent: Ford Motor Company (2018–2022); TIER (2022–2023); Bird (2023–present)
- Website: spin.pm

Spin is an electric bicycle-sharing and electric scooter-sharing company. It is based in San Francisco and was founded as a start-up in 2017, launching as a dockless bicycle-sharing system controlled by a mobile app for reservations.

== History ==
Spin was founded in 2016 as Skinny Labs, Inc. and announced in January 2017, hoping to bring Chinese-style dock-less bicycle sharing to the United States. Spin raised $8 million in Series A venture capital financing led by Grishin Robotics in May, during preparation for a wider rollout in other cities. Spin launched in Seattle, Washington, on July 17, 2017, becoming the city's first dock-less bicycle-sharing system under new regulations from the city government. Spin debuted with 500 bicycles in Seattle, and exceeded 5,000 rides during its first week in operation, surpassing the city's former bicycle-sharing system, Pronto Cycle Share. In late July, Spin announced plans to expand to South San Francisco, California, as part of a larger national rollout. The New York City Department of Transportation, however, ordered the closure of operations in Rockaway, Queens.

In February 2018, Spin rolled out scooter sharing, starting in San Francisco. The scooters were initially priced at $1 to unlock, plus fifteen cents a minute. On April 12, 2018, San Francisco's Public Works department seized several dozen Spin bikes after pedestrians objected to the bikes blocking sidewalks. The company launched in Austin, Texas, during South by Southwest in March 2017. The service was suspended by Spin within a day of launch, due to a dispute with the city government over permits and regulations.

With the expiration of Seattle's bikeshare pilot program permit, Spin decided not to seek a new permit with the city and ceased its operations there in September 2018. On November 7, 2018, the Ford Motor Company announced that it had acquired Spin and aims to expand its service to more cities. The Wall Street Journal reported that Spin was valued at $80 to 90 million at the time of the purchase. Spin announced in 2019 that in August that year it would deploy 15,000 scooters in Portland, Los Angeles, Denver, Washington, DC, Kansas City, Memphis, and Minneapolis. In September 2019, San Francisco Municipal Transportation Agency announced that it has picked 4 operators, including Spin, to each bring 1,000 scooters to San Francisco effective in mid-October, thus doubling the current number allowed.

In August 2020, Spin announced it would begin to offer its services in Germany, starting with Cologne. In late August 2020, the company continued international expansion by launching in the United Kingdom, starting with Milton Keynes followed by Essex. In early 2021, the company entered three additional countries: Canada, Spain, and Portugal. In the meantime, the company also added a new CEO, Ben Bear, to the mix which is only their second since inception.

In August 2021, the company announced its scooters would be integrated into Google Maps. Users will be able to see the nearest scooter, distance to it and how long it would take to reach the vehicle. However, Google Maps users will not have the option to rent the scooter while in the app, being redirected to Spin's own application instead.

In January 2022, Spin announced its closure of all operations across Germany, Spain, France and Portugal as well as select North American markets due to low profitability. Spin remains active in all limited markets where it was selected as a micromobility operator by city officials.

On March 2, 2022, it was announced that Berlin-based TIER had acquired Spin. Spin's UK subsidiary will be transferred into Tier operations but the brand will keep operating in the United States and Canada.

In September 2023, San Francisco-based competitor Bird acquired Spin from TIER for $19 million. In December 2023, Bird filed for Chapter 11 bankruptcy. The company has plans to restructure and sell some of its assets to some of its existing lenders.

== Equipment and usage ==
Spin uses orange-colored, single speed, pedal assist bicycles equipped with onboard GPS units and cellular modems. Bicycles are unlocked using a mobile app that scans a QR code on the bicycle. When it operated in Seattle, bicycles had to be parked in designated landscape/furniture zones on sidewalks.

By disassembling abandoned scooters in Seattle, hobbyists found out that they are powered by a Raspberry Pi 4B single board computer.
