= The Lawn =

Grassy court at University of Virginia

- University of Virginia Historic District
- U.S. National Register of Historic Places
- U.S. National Historic Landmark District
- Virginia Landmarks Register
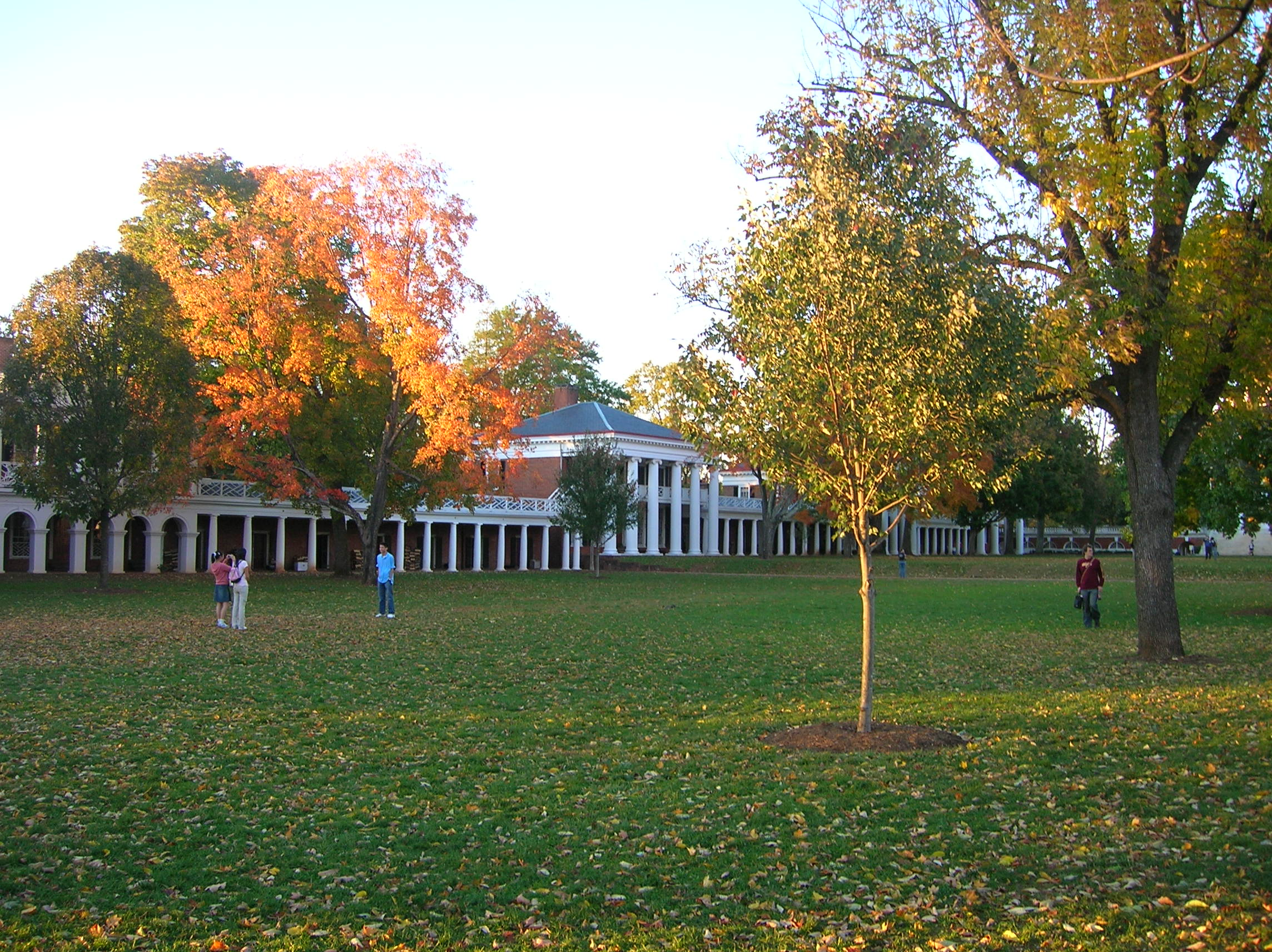
- The Lawn in October 2006

- Location within Virginia
- Location: Bounded by University and Jefferson Park Aves., and Hospital and McCormick Rds., Charlottesville, Virginia
- Coordinates: 38°2′5″N 78°30′15″W
- Area: 35 acres (14 ha)
- Built: 1817
- Architect: Thomas Jefferson; Stanford White
- Architectural style: Early Republic
- NRHP reference No.: 70000865
- VLR No.: 002-5161

Significant dates
- Added to NRHP: November 20, 1970
- Designated NHLD: November 11, 1971
- Designated VLR: October 6, 1970

UNESCO World Heritage Site
- Type: Cultural
- Criteria: i, iv, vi
- Designated: 1987 (11th session)
- Part of: Monticello and the University of Virginia in Charlottesville
- Reference no.: 442
- Region: Europe and North America

The Lawn, a part of Thomas Jefferson's Academical Village, is a large, terraced grassy court at the historic center of Jefferson's academic community at the University of Virginia. The Lawn and its surrounding buildings, designed by Jefferson, demonstrate Jefferson's mastery of Palladian and Neoclassical architecture, and the site has been recognized as an architectural masterpiece in itself, as a National Historic Landmark District and as part of a UNESCO World Heritage Site.

Jefferson originally designed the Lawn to be the center of the university, and as such it is surrounded by housing for students and faculty. Its most famous building is the Rotunda, which sits at the north end of the site, opposite Old Cabell Hall. Framing the other two sides of the Lawn are ten pavilions, where faculty reside in the upper two floors and teach on the first, as well as 54 Lawn rooms, where carefully selected undergraduates reside in their final year. Being selected as a Lawn Resident in a student's fourth year is considered one of the university's most prestigious honors.

Opposite the Pavilions and Lawn rooms are ten gardens, and similar to the Pavilions, each garden is designed in a distinct way; no two gardens are the same. The outermost row of buildings on either side constitute the edge of the Academical Village; these are known as the Range and house graduate students.

The Lawn has served as the University of Virginia's symbolic center since the university was founded in 1819. It annually serves as the site of the university's graduation ceremonies, as well as various events throughout the year.

== Description ==
The Lawn is used to refer either to the original grounds designed by Thomas Jefferson for the University of Virginia, or specifically to the grassy field around which the original university buildings are arrayed. The Lawn consists of four rows of colonnades on which alternate student rooms and larger buildings. The inner rank of colonnades, facing the central Lawn proper, contains ten Pavilions (which provided both classrooms and housing for the university's original professors) and 54 student rooms, while the outer rank, facing outward, contain six Hotels (typically service buildings and dining establishments) and another 54 student rooms. At the head of the colonnades, facing south down the Lawn is the Rotunda, a one-half scale copy of the Pantheon in brick with white columns, that originally held the university's library.

There are a total of 206 columns surrounding the Lawn: 16 on The Rotunda, 38 on the Pavilions, and 152 on the walkways. The columns are of varying orders according to the formality and usage of the space, with Corinthian columns on the exterior of the Rotunda giving way to Doric, Ionic, and Composite orders inside; Doric, Ionic, or Corinthian on each of the pavilions; and a relatively humble Tuscan colonnade along the Lawn walkways.

== History ==
=== Jefferson's design ===
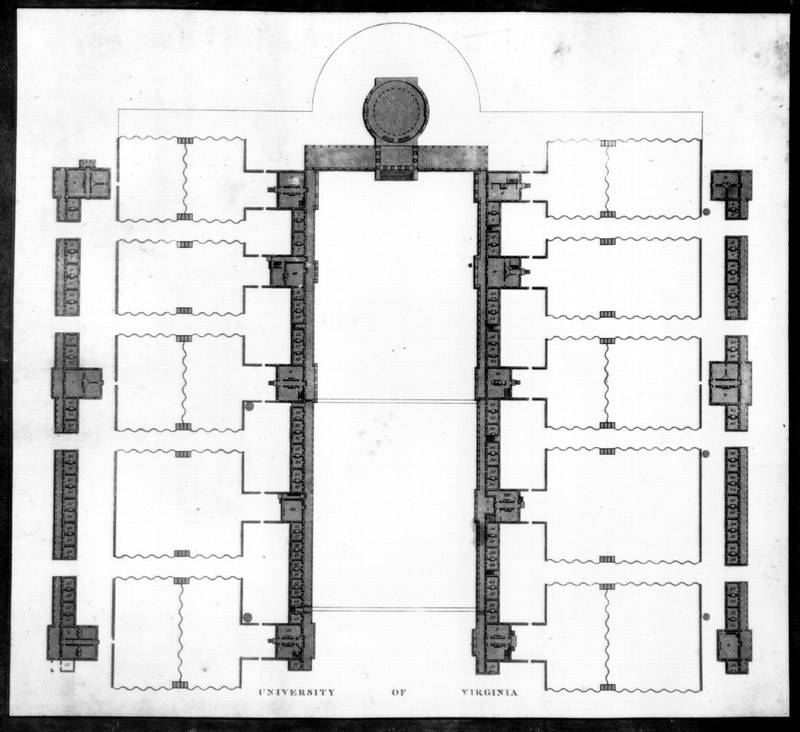
Engraving by Peter Maverick of the plan of the University of Virginia, after Jefferson's drawing, 1826.

Jefferson's design for the Lawn sought to find an alternative to traditional single-building college architecture, such as that he experienced as a student at the College of William and Mary, due to its being "noisy, unhealthy, vulnerable to fires, and affording little privacy." The overall model for the Lawn (the U-shaped plan with a central dome) is similar to, and may have been influenced by, Joseph Jacques Ramée's design for Union College and Benjamin Latrobe's design for a military academy, as well as by the designs of Palladio and by his own house, Monticello. Along the legs of the U, the colonnades provide sheltered, but outdoor, communication between the pavilions and the student rooms, and while everything in the Lawn communicates with the Lawn or the outside world, there is privacy afforded by the walled gardens.

Jefferson separated the buildings of the lawn into ten units, or Pavilions, to reflect his classification of the branches of learning, and designed the relationship between them and the rest of the Lawn. Each of the ten Pavilions has a unique design, intended to give individual dignity to each branch of study, and the whole was intended to serve as a sort of outdoor classroom for architectural study, as he wrote to William Thornton, architect of the United States Capitol:

What we wish is that these pavilions, as they will show themselves above the dormitories, shall be models of taste and good architecture, and of a variety of appearance, no two alike, so as to serve as specimens for the architectural lecturer. Will you set your imagination to work, and sketch some designs for us, no matter how loosely with the pen, without the trouble of referring to scale or rule, for we want nothing but the outline of the architecture, as the internal must be arranged according to local convenience? A few sketches, such as may not take you a minute, will greatly oblige us.

— Thomas Jefferson, Letter to William Thornton, 1817

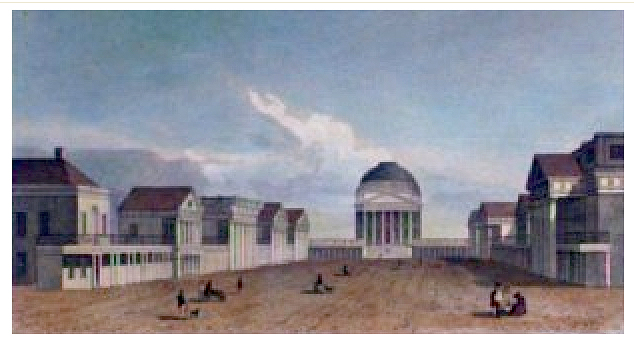
Steel engraving, 1831

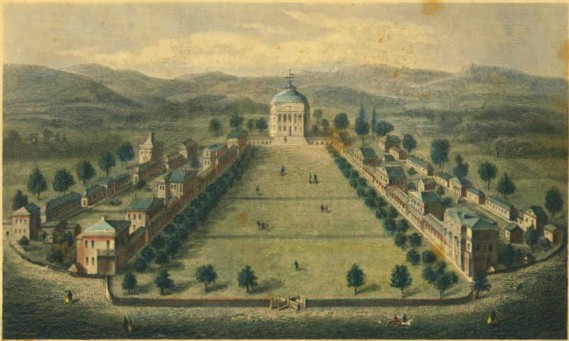
1856 engraving of the Lawn, looking north

Thornton obliged with designs for two pavilions, one of which was adapted for the design of Pavilion VII, the first to be built. Jefferson also solicited designs from Benjamin Latrobe, who had worked with Jefferson on the chambers for the United States House of Representatives. Latrobe responded with a sketch showing the plan of the university, with a domed structure resembling Palladio's Villa Capra "La Rotonda", and sent a second large drawing in October 1817 showing at least five Pavilion elevations, and maybe ten (while he had promised Jefferson "seven or eight" Pavilions, the actual drawing has been lost). It is believed that Latrobe's drawings were used for the designs of Pavilions III, V, IX and X. Further, it is speculated that many of the eastern Pavilions were based on Latrobe's designs, as Jefferson prepared the drawings for all five buildings in a mere three weeks. Throughout the process, Jefferson adapted the designs to fit the site, adjusting the width, specifying the entablature, and providing the detailed design of the interior of the Rotunda.

The area between the Pavilions and the Ranges was designated as garden space in Thomas Jefferson's original plans. The current design of the gardens is a result of an initiative begun by University president Colgate Darden to return them to something approximating the original Jeffersonian design.

The overall effect of the different portions of the Lawn, the Rotunda, Pavilions, student rooms, and the physical site, is, in the words of Garry Wills, "paradoxical ... regimentation and individual expression ... hierarchical order and relaxed improvising. ... But it is the reconciliation of these apparent irreconcilables that is the genius of the system."

=== Early inhabitants of the Lawn: Students, professors, and slaves ===
The original 108 student rooms (54 on the Lawn, and 27 on each of the adjacent Ranges) were doubles, permitting the housing of up to 216 students. In practice, with enrollment at the university considerably lower during the first sessions, the dormitory rooms adjacent to the Pavilions were used in some cases by the professors until 1854. As the university's enrollment grew, from 128 students in 1842–1843 to 604 in 1861, students began to seek lodging in University-approved boarding houses in addition to the Lawn. Additional changes to the makeup of the residents included the use of Lawn rooms as barracks for officer candidates during World War II, a shift from double to single occupancy in 1959, and the arrival of the first women undergraduates on the Lawn in 1972.

The Pavilions were designed as both housing for professors and as classroom space. The original plan for the university described the Pavilions as "a distinct pavilion or building for each separate professorship; these to be arranged around a square; each pavilion to contain a school-room and two apartments for the accommodation of the professor's family, and other reasonable conveniences." However, due to a combination of practical concerns over the ability of the first-floor lecture rooms to accommodate enough students for large lectures, and objections from the families of the professors that the space was required for entertaining, students rarely had access to the rooms.

In addition to the professors and their families, in the pre-Civil War days the Pavilions also housed the slaves of the professors. While University students were prohibited by the University's Enactments from bringing their personal slaves with them, professors could and did own slaves, who were quartered in Pavilion or Hotel cellars or in outbuildings. In one case, Lewis Commodore, a slave owned by the university, was granted accommodations within the Rotunda itself, only to be turned out by the Board of Visitors two years later.

=== The Rotunda annex and fire of 1895 ===
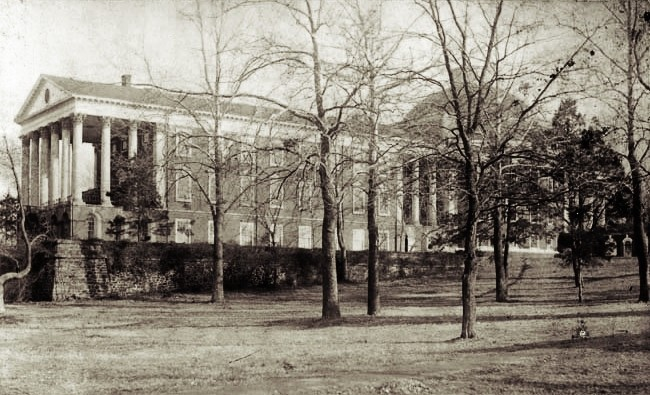
University of Virginia Rotunda Annex (1895)

As the size of the student body increased, the Rotunda was extended with a structure called the Annex, also known as "New Hall," on its north side in 1853. The Annex, which extended 100 feet (30 m) from the original north façade of the Rotunda, added about 10,000 square feet (930 m^{2}) of classroom and meeting space, including a Public Hall that seated 1200 people.

In 1895, the Rotunda was entirely gutted by a fire that started in faulty electrical wiring in the Public Hall of the Annex. University students saved what was, for them, the most important item within the Rotunda—a life-size likeness of Mr. Jefferson carved from marble that was given to the University by Alexander Galt in 1861; the students also rescued a portion of the books of the university library from the Dome Room, as well as various scientific instruments from the classrooms in the Annex. Shortly after the fire, the faculty drew up a recommendation to the Board of Visitors, recommending a program of rebuilding that called for the reconstruction of the Rotunda and the replacement of the lost classroom space of the Annex with a set of buildings at the south end of the Lawn.

=== After the Rotunda fire: Stanford White buildings ===
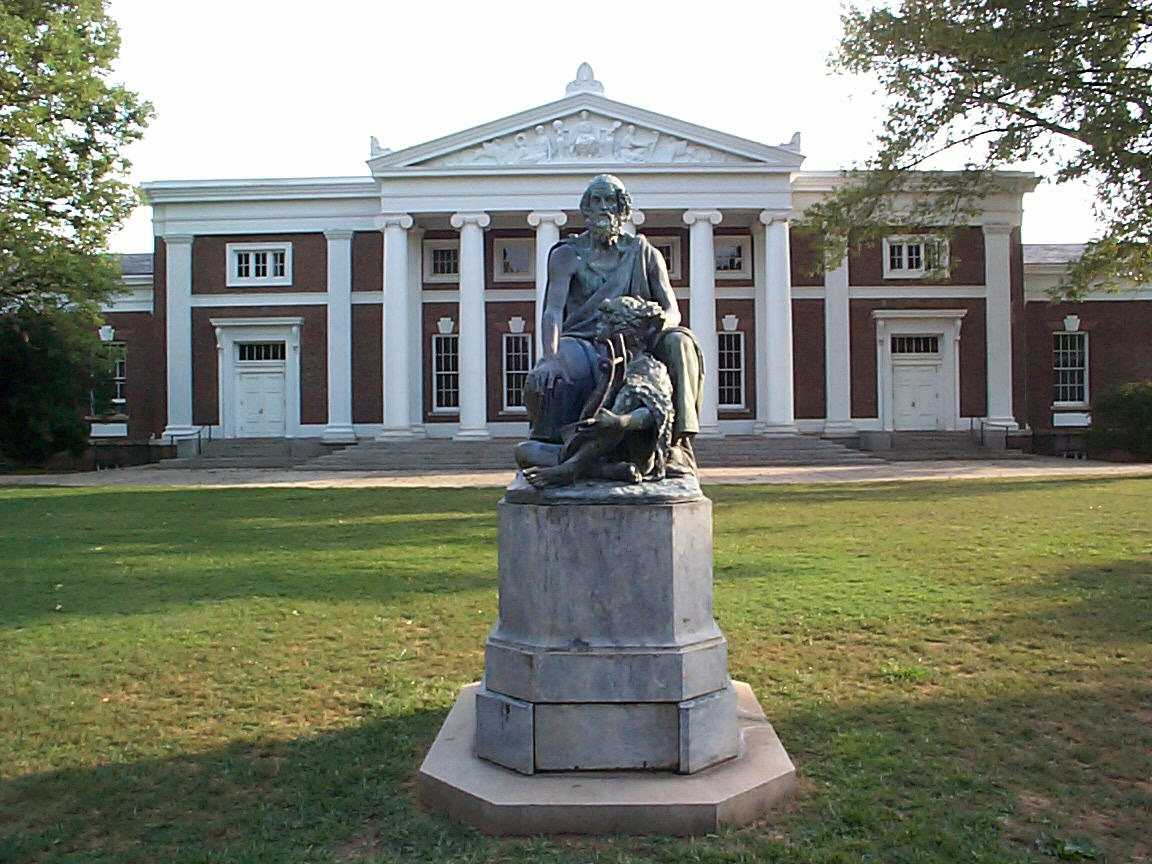
Old Cabell Hall and Homer, University of Virginia

Following the burning of the Rotunda in 1895, the firm of McKim, Mead, and White and its architect Stanford White was hired to rebuild the Rotunda and to create new academic buildings to compensate for the loss of the Rotunda annex. White created three academic buildings, Cocke Hall, Rouss Hall, and Cabell Hall (now Old Cabell Hall) at the base of the Lawn, enclosing the southern view which had previously been open to the Blue Ridge Mountains. The creation of this building group enclosed the Lawn and set its dimensions permanently; subsequent development of the university has happened outside of the boundaries of the Academical Village.

After the new academic buildings were erected, a statue of Homer by sculptor and Virginia native Moses Jacob Ezekiel was given to the university in 1907 and placed in the quadrangle in front of Old Cabell Hall. Ezekiel also created the bronze statue of Jefferson on a bell-shaped pedestal that stands in front of the north stairs of the Rotunda. During the same period, statues of Jefferson and George Washington were added to the south of Pavilions IX and X, facing each other across the Lawn to the north of the Rouss/Cabell/Cocke quadrangle. The Jefferson statue, a replica of the Karl Bitter sculpture made for the Louisiana Purchase Exhibition, was added in 1915, and the replica of Houdon's statue of George Washington was added later.

== Uses ==
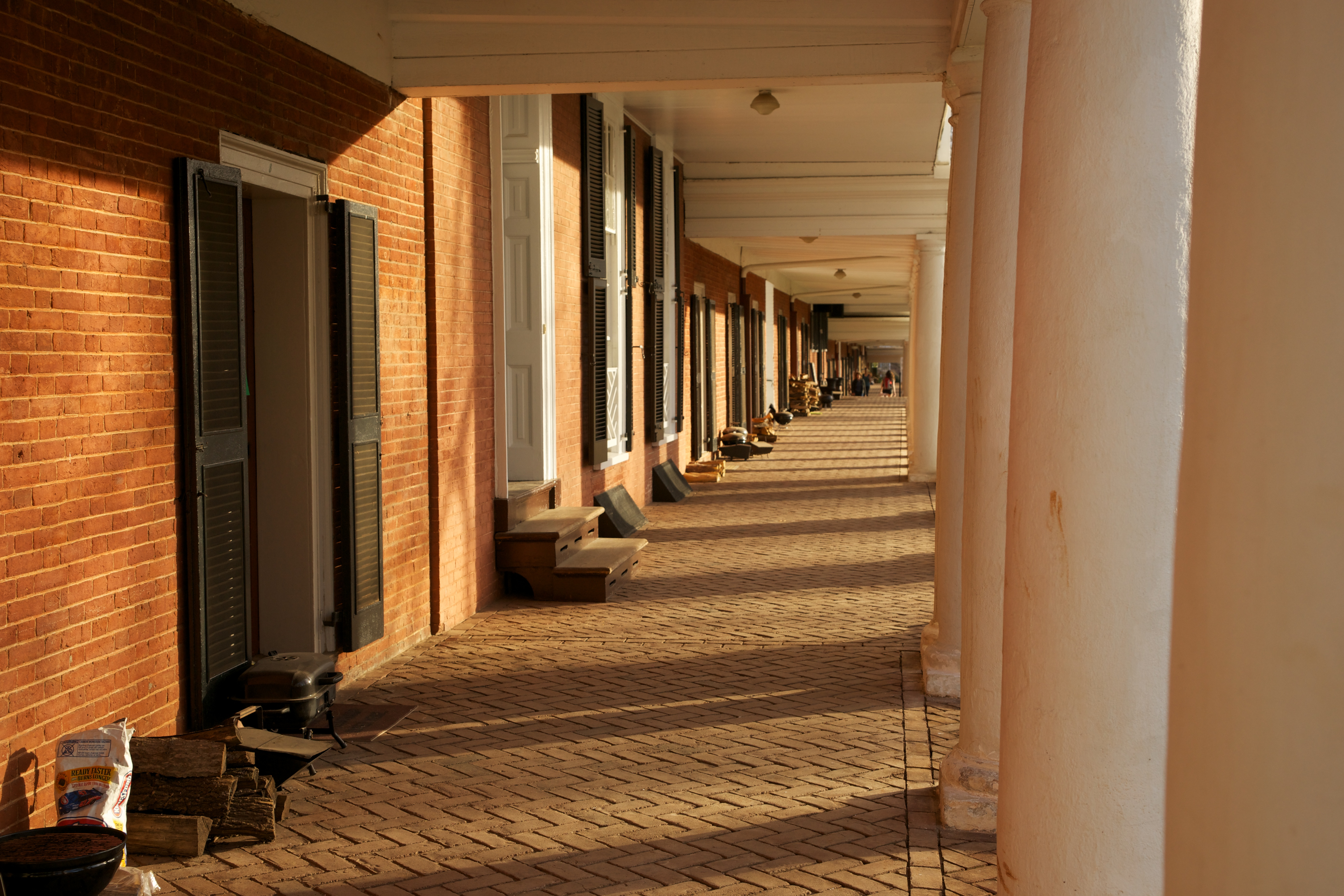
Student rooms on the East Lawn

Graduation exercises at the University of Virginia are held on the Lawn every May, and it is considered one of the institution's major traditions.

Being chosen for residence on the Lawn is one of the university's highest honors and is very prestigious. All undergraduate students who will graduate at the end of their year of residency are eligible to apply to live in one of the 47, out of 54 rooms open to the general student body. Applications – which vary from year to year, but generally include a résumé, personal statement and responses to several questions – are reviewed by a reading committee and the top vote-getters are offered Lawn residency, with several alternates also given notice of potential residency. Five of the remaining seven rooms are "endowed" by organizations on Grounds: the Jefferson Literary and Debating Society (room 7; founded there on July 14, 1825), Trigon Engineering Society (room 17; founded on November 3, 1924), Residence Staff (room 26), the Honor Committee (room 37) and the Kappa Sigma fraternity (room 46; founded there on December 10, 1869). These groups have their own selection process for choosing who will live in their Lawn room although the Dean of Students renders final approval. The Gus Blagden "Good Guy" room (15) resident is chosen from a host of nominees and does not necessarily belong to any particular group. Residency in the John K. Crispell memorial pre-med room (1) is usually granted to an outstanding pre-med student from among the group of 47 offered regular Lawn residency. Residence in the pavilions is also desirable. However, only nine of the pavilions have faculty residents, as Pavilion VII is the Colonnade Club. The University's Board of Visitors has final approval over which faculty members may live in a pavilion. Pavilion residency is typically offered as a three- or five-year contract with the option to renew. Pavilion residents are expected to interact with their younger "Lawnie" neighbors, as Jefferson intended.

Early each December since 2001, the university celebrates winter with the "Lighting of the Lawn", where some 22,000 small white light bulbs are draped around the various buildings of the Lawn and lit up at once with great ceremony, immediately following the reading of a student-composed holiday-themed poem. The lights are turned on each nightfall until the end of the semester, usually about two weeks later. Thousands of students turn out for the opening event.

== The South Lawn Project ==
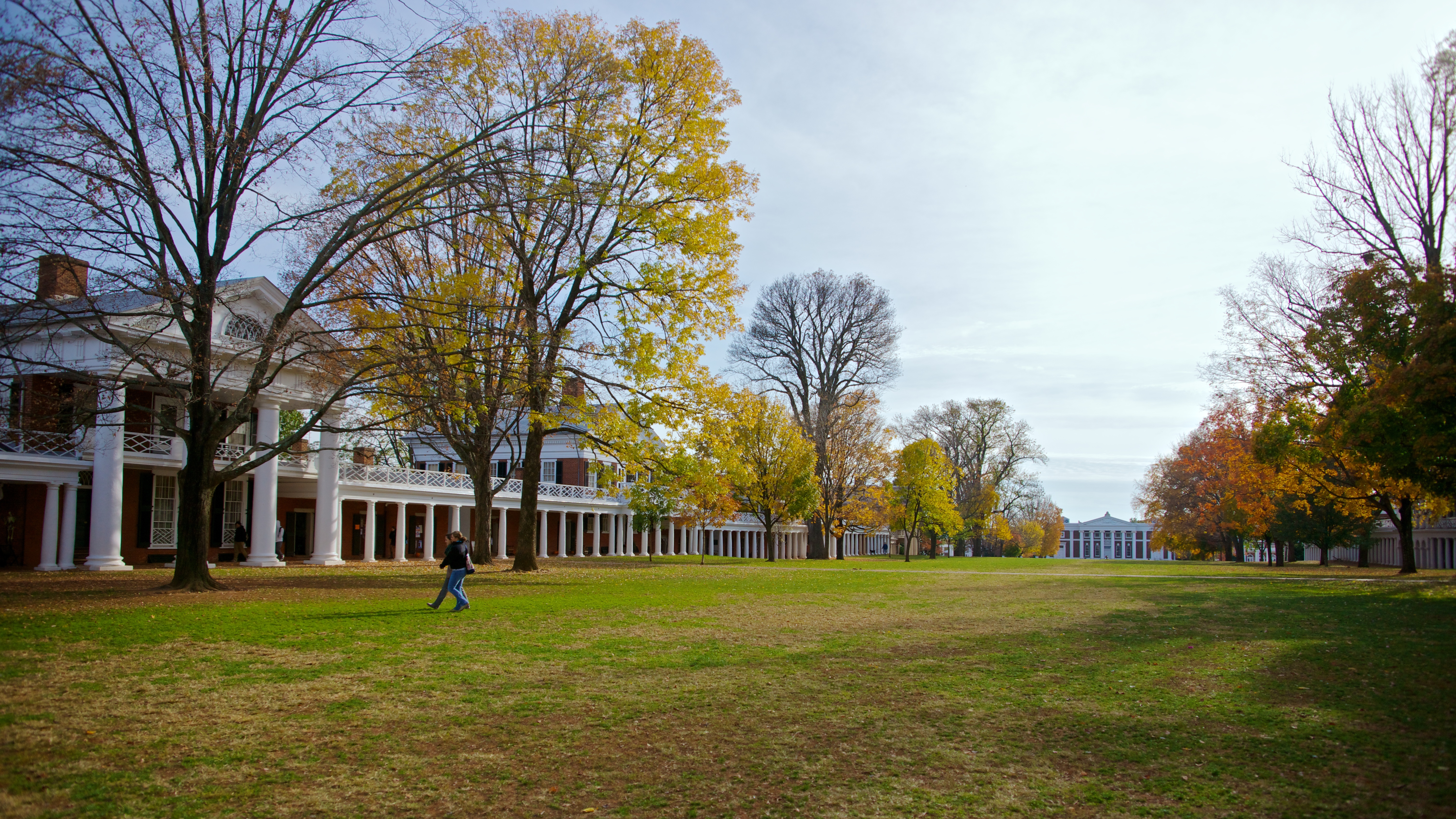
Today's view of the Lawn, looking south toward Old Cabell Hall; the East Lawn is to the left.

In recent years, the Lawn changed considerably as a consequence of the South Lawn Project. The McIntire School of Commerce moved to a newly renovated Rouss Hall, formerly home of the college's Economics department. Monroe Hall (former home of the McIntire School) became part of the college. As part of the project, New Cabell Hall was renovated (though it was originally planned for demolition), and the Lawn was extended via a bridge over Jefferson Park Avenue to the space across and "above" the street – where before there was a faculty parking lot. The overall project added over 100,000 square feet (9,300 m^{2}) of classroom and office space.

Originally awarded to modernist New York architecture firm Polshek Partnership, the final architects, Moore Ruble Yudell, chose a neoclassicist approach for the project. Criticism arose over the allegedly derivative architectural nature of the project. It aped certain aspects of The Lawn, leading UVA professor Jason Johnson to call it a "theme park".

This tension, common on college campuses around America and elsewhere, illustrated the broader conundrum of how to expand an architectural icon, taking advantage of modern building techniques and related cost advantages, without being obviously derivative in style. Other critics take the point of view that the neoclassicist approach is more appropriate in the context of the University of Virginia, contrasting the plans to other UVA projects like the modernist Hereford College and the revivalist Darden School. There has been open feuding over the neoclassical architectural approach ultimately chosen, with both sides writing letters or taking out ad space in the university's student newspaper, The Cavalier Daily.

UVA had the South Lawn Project LEED certified. The South Lawn Project was completed in the fall of 2010.

== Landmark designations and awards ==
The Lawn has been designated a U.S. National Historic Landmark District, and is part of a UNESCO World Heritage Site along with the original buildings of the University of Virginia and Monticello, Jefferson's nearby residence; this designation is due to the site's architectural and cultural significance. In 2026, Architectural Record magazine included the University of Virginia campus on its list of "the most significant works of American architecture". The historian Paul Goldberger wrote that the campus "brings together architectural form and symbol with more serene grace than any other building in the United States".

== See also ==
- Jeffersonian architecture
- List of National Historic Landmarks in Virginia
- National Register of Historic Places listings in Albemarle County, Virginia

== Sources ==
- Bruce, Philip Alexander (1921). History of the University of Virginia: The Lengthening Shadow of One Man. New York: Macmillan.
- Dabney, Virginius (1981). Mr. Jefferson's University: A History. Charlottesville: University of Virginia Press. ISBN 0-8139-0904-X.
- Patton, John S. (1906). Jefferson, Cabell, and the University of Virginia. New York: Neale Publishing Company. p. 235. "jefferson society cabell patton."
- Wills, Garry (2002). Mr. Jefferson's University. Washington, DC: National Geographic Directions. ISBN 0-7922-6531-9. "editions."
