= Dott (transportation company) =

Electric scooter and bicycle rental company

Tier Mobility SE

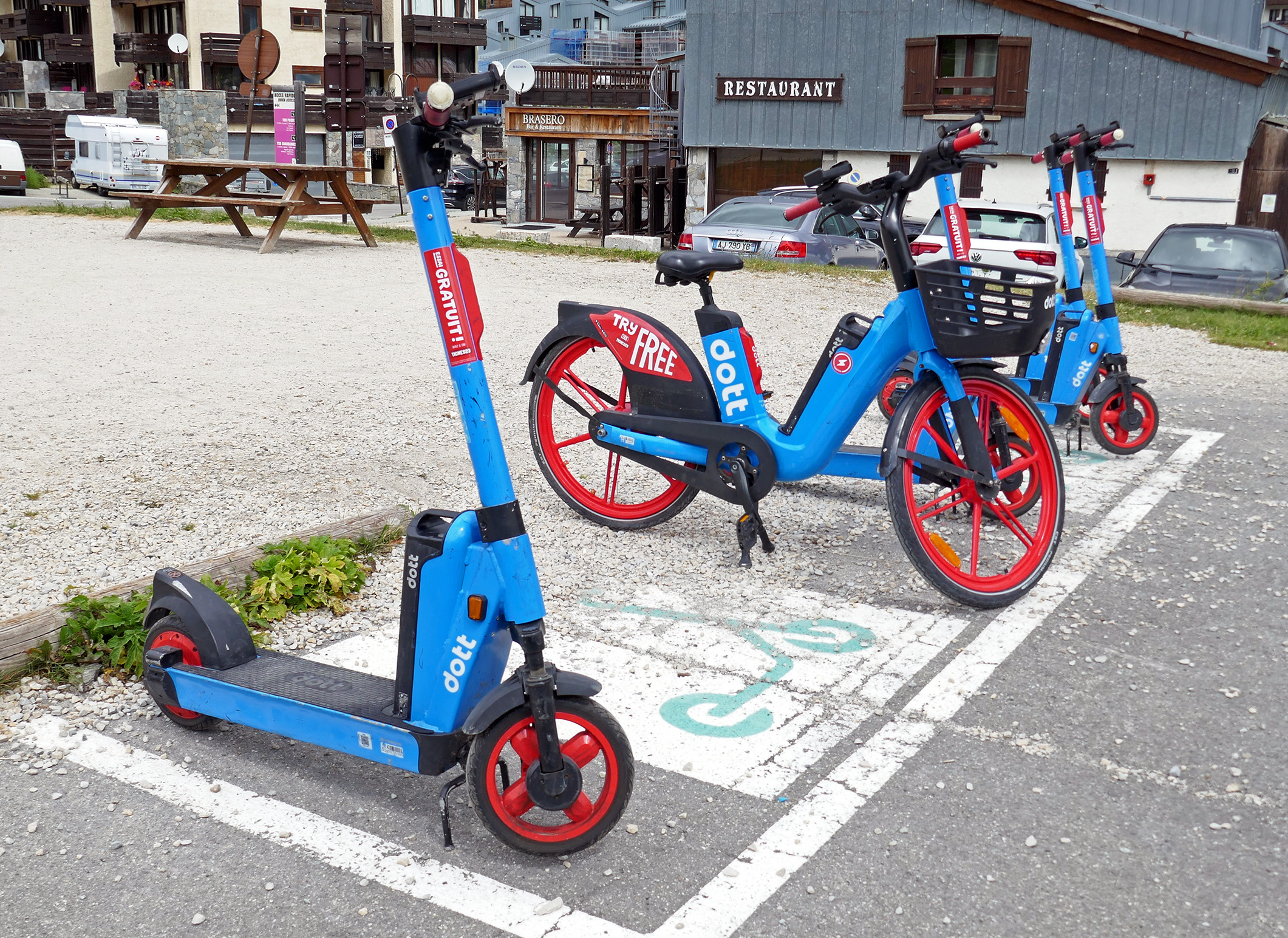
- Trade name: dott
- Formerly: TIER
- Company type: Private
- Industry: Micromobility
- Incorporated: Germany
- Founded: 24 July 2018; 7 years ago in Berlin, Germany
- Founder: Julian Blessin, Lawrence Leuschner
- Headquarters: Berlin, Germany
- Area served: Europe, Middle East
- Number of employees: 1677 (2024)
- Website: ridedott.com

Dott (formally Tier Mobility SE) is a German company based in Berlin, Germany which was founded in July 2018. In January 2024, TIER and Dott announced the closing of a financial transaction to merge the two companies. With revenues of €250m, the company is supporting over 125M trips a year in more than 20 countries. Dott is one of the three companies that are authorized to operate rentals of electric scooters in London during a one-year trial of the use of e-scooters.

== History ==
The company had been selected along with Lime and the then operator of the dott brand to participate in a year-long trial of the use of e-scooters as a method of transportation in London.

In March 2024 the company acquired emTransit B.V., which was then operating under the dott brand name. emTransit had been founded in September 2019 by the French Henri Moissinac and Maxim Romain. It had its Series A round of funding in 2019, raising €30 million led by EQT Ventures and Naspers; this was followed by a Series B round in April for $85 million, led by Sofina.
