= Thacher =

Thacher may refer to:

== People ==
- Ebby Thacher (1896–1966), early member of the sobriety movement that later became Alcoholics Anonymous
- George Thacher (1817–1878), an American academic
- James Thacher (1754–1844), an American physician
- Jeff Thacher (born 1967), an American musician
  - James Kingsley Thacher (1847–1891), his son, an American professor of medicine
- John Boyd Thacher (1847–1909), mayor of Albany, New York, like his father George Thacher
  - John Boyd Thacher II, his nephew, mayor of Albany, New York
- Joseph S. B. Thacher (1812–1867), American lawyer and state judge
- Nicholas G. Thacher (1915–2002), an American diplomat
- Peter Thacher (1752–1802), an American congregationalist minister
- Russell Thacher (c. 1919 – 1990), an American author and film producer
- Ryan Thacher (born 1989), an American tennis player
- Samuel Cooper Thacher (1785–1818), an American clergyman and librarian
- Solon O. Thacher (1830-1895), American politician, judge, and lawyer
- Thomas Thacher (minister) (1620–1678), English clergyman and settler in New England
  - Thomas Anthony Thacher (1815–1886), a descendant, an American classicist and college administrator
    - Sherman Day Thacher, his son, founder of the Thacher School
    - Thomas Thacher (1850–1919), his son, an American lawyer
      - Thomas D. Thacher, his son and Solicitor General of the United States
    - Elizabeth Thacher Kent (1868–1952), his daughter, an environmentalist and women's rights activist
- Thomas Chandler Thacher (1858–1945), American politician
- William Thacher (1866–1953), an American tennis player

== Places ==
- Thacher, Ohio, U.S.
- Thatcher, Nebraska, U.S., also known as Thacher
- Thachers Hill, New Jersey, U.S.
- Thacher Island, off Cape Ann, Massachusetts, U.S.
- Thacher River, in Massachusetts, U.S.

== Other uses ==
- The Thacher School, Ojai, California, U.S.

== See also ==
- Thacker (disambiguation)
- Thatcher (disambiguation)
- Simpson Thacher & Bartlett
- Thacher Proffitt & Wood
