= Thomas Thacher (disambiguation) =

Thomas Thacher (1850–1918) was an American lawyer and father of Thomas D. Thacher.

Thomas Thacher may also refer to:

- Thomas Anthony Thacher (1815–1886), American classicist and Yale administrator, father of Thomas Thacher
- Thomas Chandler Thacher (1858–1945), U.S. Representative from Massachusetts
- Thomas D. Thacher (1881–1950), American lawyer and judge from New York
- Thomas Thacher (minister) (1620–1678), American clergyman

== See also ==
- Thomas Thatcher (also known as Thomas Thacher), minister from Dedham, Massachusetts
