= Sherman Kent =

American historian and pioneer of intelligence analysis

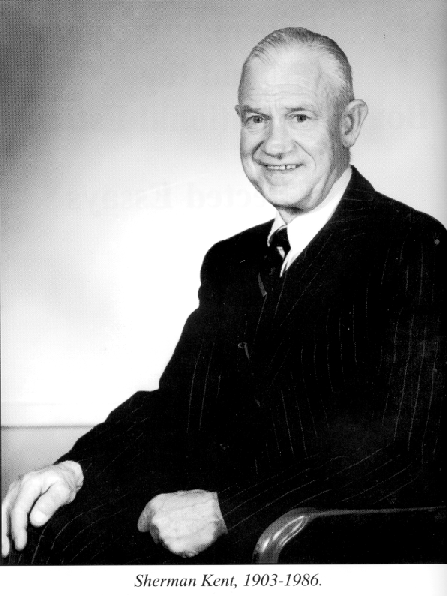
Sherman Kent

Sherman Kent (December 6, 1903 – March 11, 1986) was a Yale University history professor who, during World War II and through 17 years of Cold War-era service in the Central Intelligence Agency, pioneered many of the methods of intelligence analysis. He is often described as "the father of intelligence analysis".

== Early life and education ==
Kent was the son of U.S. Congressman William Kent and women's rights activist Elizabeth Thacher Kent, and the brother of Roger Kent and Adaline Kent. His grandfather was Yale professor Thomas Anthony Thacher, and he was great-great-grandson of American founding father Roger Sherman. He was a graduate of The Thacher School (founded by his uncle Sherman Day Thacher) and Yale University where he studied European history with the intention of spending his career as an academic. After graduating in 1926, he spent several years teaching and doing research but joined the Office of Strategic Services (OSS) with the outbreak of the war in Europe in 1942.

== Career ==
Sherman Kent first served within the Research and Analysis Branch of the OSS as Chief of the Europe-Africa Division. In this capacity, he oversaw much of the process which would now be considered intelligence preparation of the battlespace in support of planning for Operation Torch, the 1942 Allied invasion of North Africa. (An irreverent wit, Kent once proposed for the heraldic emblem of the often-zany OSS, "A horse's ass rampant on a Boston Social Register".)

After a post-war stint at the National War College, he returned to Yale for three years, during which time he penned his classic work, Strategic Intelligence for American World Policy. In November 1950, during the crisis that followed, the Chinese Communist incursion in the Korean War, which prompted a build-up and reorganization of the American Intelligence Community, he was called to Washington, DC, to assist Harvard historian William L. Langer, with whom he had worked in OSS, to form a new CIA Office of National Estimates (ONE). He succeeded Langer as chief of ONE in 1952, serving in that position for the next fifteen years under four Directors of Central Intelligence in four presidential administrations.

ONE was "a small organization, consisting of a Board of National Estimates of between five and twelve senior experts, a professional staff of 25–30 regional and functional specialists, and a support staff." Until it was dissolved, six years after Kent's retirement, in a Watergate-era CIA reorganization, ONE prepared more than 1,500 speculative National Intelligence Estimates for the President and top foreign policy-makers.

Kent led ONE through years of challenge and crisis, including McCarthy-era accusations against one of Kent's young aides, future presidential advisor William Bundy, and "predictive failures" during the Cuban Missile Crisis and other Cold War "flaps".

Kent's role within the US intelligence community was to formalize analytical "tradecraft" and methodologies, while encouraging creation of a "literature of intelligence" to provide a formal mechanism for the transfer of knowledge and experiences between generations of analysts.

== Death and legacy ==
Sherman Kent retired from the CIA in 1967 and died in 1986.

In 2000, the CIA established a school in Kent's name dedicated to the pursuit of professionalism in the art and science of intelligence analysis.

In 2025, the Sherman Kent Foundation was created, dedicated to the development of open intelligence and the development of analysts in Latin America.

== Publications ==
=== History ===
- Electoral Procedure Under Louis Philippe (Yale University Press, 1937)
- Writing History (NY, 1941; 1967)
- Election of 1827 in France (Harvard University Press, 1975)

=== Intelligence ===
- Strategic Intelligence for American World Policy (Princeton University Press, 1949; 1966)
- Words of Estimative Probability (CIA, 1964)
- Sherman Kent and the Board of National Estimates: Collected Essays

- The Law and Custom of the National Intelligence Estimate (CIA, 1965)
- The Making of an NIE (CIA, 1967)
- The Theory of Intelligence (CIA 1968)

=== Autobiography ===
- A Boy and a Pig, But Mostly Horses (NY, 1974) ("Recounts the adventures of three boys during the summer they spend working on a Nevada ranch in the 1920s")
- *Letters (also listed as Buffalo Letters): Sherman Kent to His Family, 1936–1965 ([n.d., but "for Christmas 1990" mentioned in Acknowledgements; n.p., probably Washington D. C.]) (private publication for family members edited by Margaret Gourd-Barrett, published by Kent's widow, illustrated by Kent)
- Reminiscences of a Varied Life (San Rafael, CA, 1991)

== See also ==
- Sherman Kent School for Intelligence Analysis
- Studies in Intelligence
- Fundacion Sherman Kent

== Biographic sources ==
- Harold P. Ford, "A Tribute to Sherman Kent" in Studies in Intelligence (CIA Center for the Study of Intelligence, 1980)
- Steury, Donald Paul, ed. "Sherman Kent and the Board of National Estimates: Collected Essays" (CIA Center for the Study of Intelligence, 1994)
