= Thomas Thacker =

Thomas or Tom Thacker may refer to:

- Tom Thacker (basketball) (born 1939), American basketball player
- Tom Thacker (musician) (born 1974), Canadian singer and lead guitarist
- Thomas Thacker (died 1548), steward of Thomas Cromwell, Repton Priory

== See also ==
- Thacker (disambiguation)
