= J. Harold Ellens =

American psychologist (1932–2018)

- Born: June 16, 1932
- Died: April 13, 2018 (aged 85)
- Education: Horace H. Rackham School of Graduate Studies; University of Kansas; Princeton Theological Seminary; National Defense University; Dwight D. Eisenhower School for National Security and Resource Strategy; United States Army War College

J. Harold Ellens (16 July 1932 — 13 April 2018) was a psychologist and theologian. He was the founding editor of the Journal of Psychology and Christianity and also the Executive Director of the Christian Association for Psychological Studies International from 1974 to 1989. He was one of the key figures in psychological biblical criticism and served as Chair of the Psychology and Biblical Studies Section of the Society of Biblical Literature.

== Education ==
Ellens received multiple educational degrees:

- PhD in Second Temple Judaism and Christian Origins, Department of Near Eastern Studies, University of Michigan, 2009
- PhD, Psychology of Human Communications, Wayne State University, 1970
- Master's degree in Second Temple Judaism and Christian Origins, NES, University of Michigan, 2002
- Master's degree in New Testament and Christian Origins, Princeton Theological Seminary, 1965
- Master's degree in Divinity in Theology and Biblical Studies, Calvin Theological Seminary, 1986
- Bachelor of Divinity Degree in Theology and Biblical Studies, Calvin Theological Seminary, 1956
- Bachelor of Arts Degree in Philosophy and Classics, Calvin College, 1953
- Military graduate of the Army Chaplain Staff College, of the Command and General Staff College, of the Industrial College of the Armed Forces, of the Army Special Warfare School (Civil Affairs), of the US Army War College, and of the National Defense University

Ellens was an ordained Christian minister (ordained 24 June 1956) and maintained a private practice in psychotherapy which began in 1965. As a psychotherapist, he was licensed in the State of Michigan and was certified by the National Board for Certified Counselors.

== Publications ==
Ellens published more than 160 professional journal articles and served as author, co-author, or editor of 181 books.

== Selected works ==
=== Books ===
- Ellens, J. Harold (1974). Models of Religious Broadcasting. Grand Rapids, MI: Eerdmans. ISBN 9780802834379. OCLC 898186.
- ——— (2009). The Spirituality of Sex. Psychology, Religion, and Spirituality. Westport, CT: Praeger. ISBN 9780313362613. OCLC 268789587.

=== Edited by ===
- ———; Aden, LeRoy, eds. (1988). The Church and Pastoral Care. Psychology and Christianity. Vol. 2. Grand Rapids, MI: Baker Book House. ISBN 9780801002137. OCLC 17619604.
- ———, ed. (2004). The Destructive Power of Religion: Violence in Judaism, Christianity, and Islam: Volume 1 - Sacred scriptures, ideology, and violence. Contemporary Psychology. Westport, CT: Praeger. ISBN 9780275979720. OCLC 928780576.
- ———, ed. (2004). The Destructive Power of Religion: Violence in Judaism, Christianity, and Islam: Volume 2 - Religion, psychology, and violence. Contemporary Psychology. Westport, CT: Praeger. ISBN 9780275979737. OCLC 926896468.
- ———, ed. (2004). The Destructive Power of Religion: Violence in Judaism, Christianity, and Islam: Volume 3 - Models and cases of violence in religion. Contemporary Psychology. Westport, CT: Praeger. ISBN 9780275979744. OCLC 773595767.
- ———, ed. (2004). The Destructive Power of Religion: Violence in Judaism, Christianity, and Islam: Volume 4 - Contemporary views on spirituality and violence. Contemporary Psychology. Westport, CT: Praeger. ISBN 9780275981464. OCLC 314484859.
- ———, ed. (2013). Heaven, Hell, and the Afterlife: eternity in Judaism, Christianity, and Islam. Psychology, Religion, and Spirituality. Santa Barbara, CA: Praeger. ISBN 9781440801839. OCLC 902815605.
