= Roger Kent =

American politician

Roger Kent (June 8, 1906 – May 16, 1980) was an American politician and member of the Democratic Party. He served alternately as chairman and vice-chairman of the California Democratic Party between 1954 and 1965.

== Biography ==
Roger Kent was a son of William Kent and Elizabeth Thacher Kent. One of seven children, Kent's siblings included Central Intelligence Agency official Sherman Kent and artist Adaline Kent. His father served as a member of the U.S. House of Representatives from California from 1910 to 1917.

After attending the Potomac School and Sidwell Friends School in Washington, D.C., Kent attended Tamalpais High School in Mill Valley beginning in 1919. He then boarded for three years at the Thacher School in Ojai, California (founded by and named for his mother's family) to prepare for college. He graduated from Yale College in 1928 and Yale Law School in 1931. Kent practiced law in California and was admitted to practice before the U.S. Supreme Court in 1937. In 1936, Kent worked as an attorney at the U.S. Securities and Exchange Commission.

Kent served as an officer in the U.S. Navy during World War II, and was awarded the Silver Star for conspicuous gallantry in action at Guadalcanal before leaving the service in 1945 at the rank of commander.

Following World War II, Kent made two unsuccessful runs for Congress as a Democrat in 1948 and 1950. He later served in the Truman Administration as general counsel at the U.S. Department of Defense.

Following the end of the Truman Administration, Kent returned to California Democratic politics. After serving as chairman of Richard Graves' 1954 campaign for governor, Kent was elected chairman of the Northern California Division of the Democratic State Central Committee. Kent subsequently alternated between vice-chairman and chairman of the California Democratic Party every two years between 1954 and 1965. Kent was especially close to Hubert Humphrey and Adlai Stevenson, both of whom he hosted during fundraising and political visits to California during the Eisenhower Administration.

Kent served as chairman of Pat Brown's successful 1962 reelection campaign against Richard Nixon. Kent would later step down from the California Democratic Party to head Brown's 1966 reelection campaign, which Brown lost to challenger Ronald Reagan.

In addition to state campaigns, Kent was also involved in several presidential campaigns, beginning with Adlai Stevenson's 1956 campaign. He later served as state chairman for the 1960 Kennedy-Johnson campaign and Northern California chairman of the 1964 Johnson-Humphrey campaign.

Kent married Alice Cooke in Honolulu, Hawaii, on August 26, 1930. They had four children, one of whom died at a young age. Roger Kent died in 1980.
