= Thatcher =

Thatcher most commonly refers to:

- Margaret Thatcher (1925–2013), Prime Minister of the United Kingdom from 1979 to 1990
- A professional who installs thatch as a roofing material, i.e. by means of thatching

Thatcher may also refer to:

== People ==
- Thatcher baronets, a baronetcy created for Denis Thatcher, the husband of Margaret Thatcher

=== Surname ===
- America Iglesias Thatcher (1907–1989), Puerto-Rican labor activist
- Ben Thatcher (born 1975), retired Welsh footballer
- Betty Thatcher (1944–2011), English writer and lyricist
- Carol Thatcher (born 1953), daughter of Margaret Thatcher
- Colin Thatcher (born 1938), former Saskatchewan cabinet minister and convicted murderer
- Denis Thatcher (1915–2003), husband of Margaret Thatcher
- Eva Thatcher (1862–1942), American film actress
- Frank Thatcher, Dean of St George's Cathedral, Georgetown, Guyana
- Frederick Thatcher (1814–1890), English and New Zealand architect and clergyman
- George Thatcher (1754–1824), American lawyer
- Heather Thatcher (1896–1987), English actress
- Henry Thatcher (1806–1880), American admiral
- Henry Calvin Thatcher (1842–1884), the first Chief Justice of the Colorado Supreme Court
- James Thatcher (MP) (fl. 1536–1565), English politician
- James Thatcher (musician), American horn player
- Joe Thatcher (born 1981), American Major League Baseball pitcher
- J. T. Thatcher (born 1978), American football player
- Karen Thatcher (born 1984), American ice hockey player
- Kim Thatcher (born 1964), American politician
- Les Thatcher (born 1940), American wrestler
- Margaret Thatcher (1925–2013), Prime Minister of the United Kingdom from 1979 to 1990
- Mark Thatcher (born 1953), son of Margaret Thatcher
- Maurice Thatcher (1870–1973), U.S. Congressman
- Moses Thatcher (1842–1909), American Mormon apostle
- Noel Thatcher, British paralympic athlete
- Raymond S. Thatcher (1903–1988), American politician
- Richard Thatcher (1846–1909), American POW and university president
- Roger Thatcher (1926–2010), British statistician
- Roland Thatcher (born 1977), American golfer
- Ross Thatcher (1917–1971), 9th Premier of Saskatchewan
- Samuel Thatcher (1776–1872), member of the United States House of Representatives from Maine
- Sophie Thatcher, American actress
- Torin Thatcher (1905–1981), English actor

=== Given name ===
- Thatcher Demko (born 1995), American ice hockey player
- Thatcher Szalay (born 1979), American football player

== Fictional characters ==
- Becky Thatcher and Judge Thatcher, characters in Tom Sawyer, by Mark Twain
- Inspector Margaret Thatcher, a character on the television series Due South
- Jeremy Thatcher, a character in the children's novel Jeremy Thatcher, Dragon Hatcher
- John Putnam Thatcher, a character in novels by Emma Lathen
- Justine Thatcher, a character in the BBC Scotland drama Monarch of the Glen
- Margaret Thatcher, a character in the television series The Adventures of Tom Sawyer
- Thatcher, code name of Mike Baker, a playable character in the game Tom Clancy's Rainbow Six Siege
- Thatcher Davis, a character in the analog horror series The Mandela Catalogue
- Thatcher Grey, a character in the TV show Grey's Anatomy
- Walter Parks Thatcher, a character in the film Citizen Kane
- William Thatcher, protagonist in the film A Knight's Tale

== Places ==
- Thatcher, Arizona, U.S.
- Thatcher, Colorado, U.S.
- Thatcher, Idaho, U.S.
- Thatcher, Nebraska, U.S.
- Thatcher Peninsula, South Georgia and the South Sandwich Islands

== Other uses ==
- USS Thatcher, the name of more than one U.S. ship
- Thatchers Cider, a drink
- C/1861 G1 (Thatcher), a comet

== See also ==
- Thacher (disambiguation)
- Thacker (disambiguation)
- Margaret Thatcher (disambiguation)
- Thatcherism, the conviction, economic, social and political style of Margaret Thatcher
- Thatcher effect, an optical illusion involving facial recognition
