= Elizabeth Thacher Kent =

American activist (1868–1952)

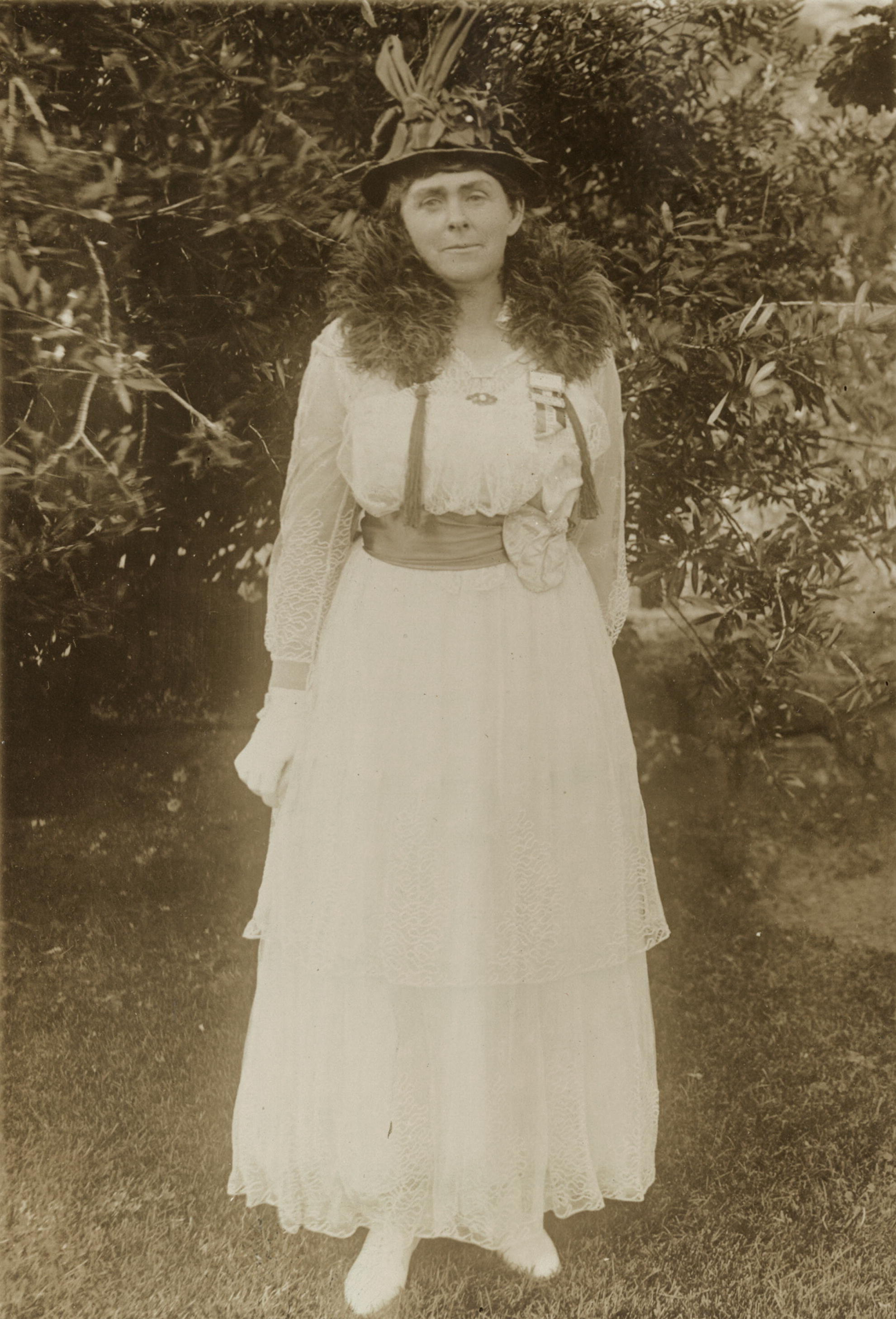
Elizabeth Thacher Kent in 1916

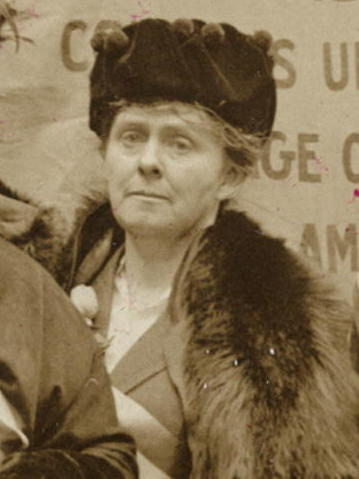
Elizabeth Thacher Kent at a suffragette event on November 10, 1917

Elizabeth Thacher Kent (September 22, 1868 – August 14, 1952) was an environmentalist and women's rights activist. Together with her husband, U.S. Congressman William Kent, she helped create the Muir Woods National Monument by donating land to the government. She was the president of her local chapter of the Women's International League for Peace and Freedom and served on the national council of the National Woman's Party. In addition, she authored an autobiography as well as a biography of her husband's life and career.

== Personal life ==
Elizabeth Thacher Kent was the daughter of Yale College professor Thomas Anthony Thacher and Elizabeth Baldwin (Sherman) Thacher. She married William Kent on February 26, 1890, and moved to Kentfield, California. Together they had seven children. Her sons include Sherman Kent (Yale professor & CIA Analyst) and Roger Kent (US politician). Her daughter was the prominent artist Adaline Kent. Her favorite recreational activities were motoring and bridge.

She was the great-granddaughter of American founding father Roger Sherman and his second wife Rebecca Minot Prescott. Her grandfather was Roger Sherman Jr.; her brother Sherman Day Thacher founded The Thacher School in Ojai, CA. She was a first cousin and close friend of Elizabeth Selden Rogers, chair of the Advisory Council of the National Woman's Party and its Legislative Chairperson for the State of New York.

== Biography ==
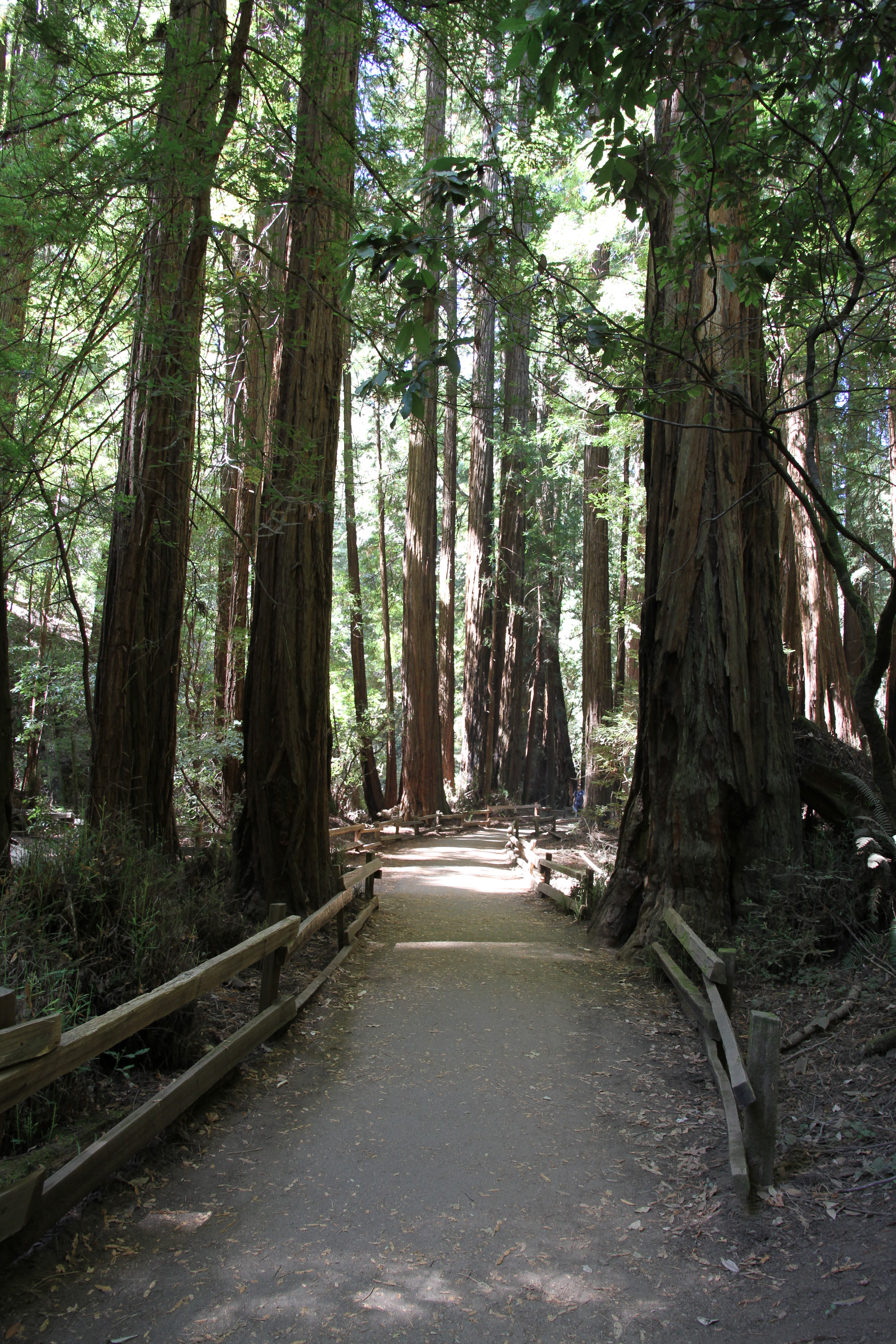
Muir Woods

Elizabeth T. Kent and her husband were active in local politics and conservation. When the coastal redwood forest in Marin were being cut down, Elizabeth and William purchased 611 acres of land and donated 295 acres to the federal government, which later became Muir Woods National Monument. Elizabeth T. Kent and John Muir were good friends, corresponding about nature and conservation.

In 1911, the Kent family moved to Washington D.C. after Mr. Kent was elected to serve his first term in Congress. Elizabeth was an active advocate of women’s rights, and was instrumental in helping women’s right to vote. She was a featured speaker at the 1913 and 1914 conventions of the National American Women’s Suffrage Association (NAWSA), and then became the leader of their Congressional Committee. She helped form the Congressional Union (later renamed the Women’s Party), which picketed the White House in support of suffrage. In the 1930s she became involved with the Women's International League for Peace and Freedom, and in 1937 became president of the Marin County chapter. In DC, she lobbied members of Congress and testified before congressional committees twice. She is one of the few Marin County women to be elected posthumously to the Marin Women’s Hall of Fame. She participated in the meeting of the United Nations in San Francisco in 1945.
