= Journal of Psychology and Christianity =

- Discipline: Psychology, religious studies
- Language: English
- Edited by: Joshua Knabb

Publication details
- Former name(s): CAPS Bulletin
- History: 1982–present
- Publisher: Christian Association for Psychological Studies
- Frequency: Quarterly

Standard abbreviations
- ISO 4: J. Psychol. Christ.

Indexing
- ISSN: 0733-4273
- OCLC no.: 60618059

Links
- Journal homepage

The Journal of Psychology and Christianity is a peer-reviewed academic journal that is "designed to provide scholarly interchange among Christian professionals in the psychological and pastoral professions." Topics covered include clinical issues, research, theoretical concerns, book reviews, and special theme areas. The editor-in-chief is Joshua Knabb (California Baptist University).

== Abstracting and indexing ==
The journal is abstracted and indexed in PsycINFO, Psychological Abstracts, Religion Index One: Periodicals, Guide to Social Science & Religion in Periodical Literature, Religious Research Association Index, Index to Book Reviews in Religion, Religious and Theological Abstracts, and Abstracts of Research in Pastoral Care and Counseling.

== History ==
The Journal of Psychology and Christianity was established in 1982 by the Christian Association for Psychological Studies, which was founded in 1952. The journal is a successor to the CAPS Bulletin, which was established in 1975. The founding editor of both the CAPS Bulletin and the Journal of Psychology and Christianity was J. Harold Ellens, who was then executive directive of CAPS.
