= Psychological biblical criticism =

Re-emerging field within biblical criticism

Psychological biblical criticism is a re-emerging field within biblical criticism that seeks to examine the psychological dimensions of scripture through the use of the behavioral sciences. The title itself involves a discussion about "the intersections of three fields: psychology, the Bible, and the tradition of rigorous, critical reading of the biblical text." (Kille, 2001). Known figures within biblical scholarship advocating this interdisciplinary field in the United States include Rev. D. Andrew Kille (2001; 2004), J. Harold Ellens (2004), Wayne G. Rollins (1983; 1999; 2004), and, in Europe, Eugen Drewermann (Beier, 2004), Gerd Theissen (1983, 1987, 2007).

Rollins was the first to define psychological biblical criticism as having the hermeneutical intent of examining

"... texts, their origination, authorship, modes of expression, their construction, transmission, translation, reading, interpretation, their transposition into kindred and alien forms, and the history of their personal and cultural effect, as expressions of the structure, processes, and habits of the human psyche, both in individual and collective manifestations, past and present." (1999:77–78)

== The worlds of scripture ==
Unlike many other forms of biblical criticism, psychological biblical criticism is not a particular method for interpretation, but is rather a perspective (Kille, 2001). This approach to the biblical text seeks to complement studies on the cultural, sociological, and anthropological influences on scripture, by discussing the psychological dimensions of: the authors of the text, the material they wish to communicate to their audience, and the reflections and meditations of the reader. As a result, the material under study involves three dimensions of text (Rollins, 1983; Kille, 2001; 2004).

=== The world behind the text ===
What was the author of the text thinking? What was their background, why were they writing? What situations drove them to put pen to paper and produce this work? What is the cultural, historical, and social context of the text? Although traditional uses of psychological theory in the study of ancient texts have sought to generate a complete psychoanalysis of scriptural writers, there has always been the hindrance of temporal and cultural distance between the analyst and analysand. Psychological biblical criticism best serves not as a reductionistic tool, but as another heuristic for use alongside traditional methods of historical and cultural criticism, illuminating aspects of purpose and meaning in the language and cognition of texts (Kille, 2001: 22–23; 2004: 23–25). In essence, a study of the world behind the text involves such questions as "... what makes them write the way they do and what realities, truths, and insights they want to share with us." (Rollins, 1983: 99).

=== The world of the text ===
Why did King Saul attempt to kill David—his greatest warrior—with a spear? Why did Judas hand Jesus over? What is the meaning of Genesis Chapter 1? To analyze the world of the text is to "describe the qualities of a character as he or she is presented in the text" (Kille, 2001:24), their actions and relationships, as well as develop insight into the motivations the writer has programmed into them. Kille in particular warns that one should be wary of trying to reach beyond the world of the text to the actual historical persons, since one may accidentally perform the function of eisegesis rather than exegesis. The world of the text may also shine light on the conditions and intent of the writer. On the one hand the characters and events within the text may reflect more the writer's socio-cultural situation than actual events, while at the same time they may inform us as to what the writer desires from us—transformation, repentance, enlightenment, etc. (Kille, 2004).

=== The world in front of the text ===
"... we often come to Scripture with the question 'What is this book?', but discover that this book asks us, 'Who is this that reads it?' ... Each of us carries... a set of values, a list of personal problems, a well seasoned worldview, and a large dose of humanity, wherever we go and to whatever task we undertake. When we approach Scripture we come with the same baggage. It is not possible to come in any other way."

— Wayne G. Rollins, 1983:98

How do I approach the text? What does the text ask of me? How do I respond to it? What meaning do I give to this relationship? The world in front of the text discusses the interplay between the text before our very eyes and the eisegetical processes that take place within our mind. In this exchange the interest is not in the psychological world of the writer, or the original meaning of the text and the characters displayed, but in how the reader manipulates, interprets, and is filled by the text; how they make it relevant to their lives, how it "speaks" to them, and how this relationship reflects their personal world (Rollins 1983: 97–100; Kille, 2001: 25–27; 2004: 27–29).

== The Bible and psychology in transition ==
"Psychology and Biblical studies are thus inevitably interlinked, regardless of what the immediate focus or concern of either is. Hence, whether we are exploring the biblical text or the living human document, the mutual illumination of psychology and biblical studies is imperative because a properly enlightened anthropology is required for both ... Because both disciplines deal with the psycho-spiritual domains, neither of these can ignore the other or it is not adequately serious about itself."

— J. Harold Ellens, 2004:284

A psychological study of the hermeneutical levels of religious texts has the capability of granting a better understanding not only of the text itself, but also of the mind that produced it, the mind that it describes, and the mind that interacts with it. This knowledge has promise for interdisciplinary application as well, by informing the field of religious studies, the psychotherapeutic encounter, and the psychology of religion. Hence, proponents of psychological biblical criticism argue that it has the potential of crossing the gap between psychology and religion, providing a platform for dialogue without reducing religion to mere drives and internal objects, but by discussing the aspects of this very human mode of meaning (Ellens, 2004).

== Recent work and case studies ==
Recent scholarship continues to apply psychological theory to biblical motifs and narratives. For example, Gili Kugler (2023), in When Psychology Meets the Bible, interprets prophetic and Deuteronomic portrayals of God as Israel's father through the lens of narcissistic parenting. She argues that Israel is depicted as a “golden child,” favored yet subject to conditional love and high expectations, while surrounding nations are depicted as “rejected siblings.” In this framework, Kugler demonstrates how this metaphorical family dynamic reveals the psychological groundwork of the biblical concept of chosenness, contrasted with the rejection and hostility directed toward Israel's “brother” Edom; both dynamics are examined through psychological theories of narcissistic parenting and pathological sibling rivalry.

Other scholars in psychological biblical criticism have similarly examined themes such as grief, trauma, divine anger, or moral development in various biblical narratives.

== See also ==
- Society of Biblical Literature
- Moses and Monotheism, work by Freud

== Bibliography ==
- Beier, Matthias. (2004). A Violent God-Image: An Introduction to the Work of Eugen Drewermann. New York, London: Continuum. Review by Wayne G. Rollins in the Review of Biblical Literature (PDF) ISBN 0-8264-1584-9.
- Eugen Drewermann Pages
- Ellens, J. Harold. (2004). The Bible and Psychology: An Interdisciplinary Pilgrimage. In Ellens & Rollins Psychology and the Bible: A New Way to Read the Scriptures. v.1, pgs. 277–287. Westport: Praeger Publishers.
- Ellens, J. Harold, & Rollins, Wayne G., eds. (2004). Psychology and the Bible: A New Way to Read the Scriptures. v.1–4. Westport: Praeger Publishers. ISBN 0-275-98347-1
- Kille, D. Andrew Kille. (2001). Psychological Biblical Criticism. Minneapolis: Augsburg Fortress Publishers. (PDF) ISBN 0-8006-3246-X
- Kille, D. Andrew Kille. (2004). Reading the Bible in Three Dimensions: Psychological Biblical Interpretation. In Ellens & Rollins Psychology and the Bible: A New Way to Read the Scriptures. v.1, pgs. 17–32. Westport: Praeger Publishers.
- Kugler, Gili. "Narcissistic Father and Hated Brother: Decoding the Psychology of Biblical Chosenness." In Heather A. McKay & Pieter van der Zwan (eds.), When Psychology Meets the Bible. Sheffield: Sheffield Phoenix Press, 2023, pp. 285–305. ISBN 978-1-914490-27-9. Online version.
- Rollins, Wayne G. (1983). Jung and the Bible. Atlanta: John Knox Press. ISBN 0-8042-1117-5
- Rollins, Wayne G. (1999). Soul and Psyche: The Bible in Psychological Perspective. Minneapolis: Augsburg Fortress Publishers. ISBN 0-8006-2716-4
- Rollins, Wayne G. & D. Andrew Kille, Eds. (2007) Psychological Insight into the Bible: Texts and Readings. Grand Rapids: Wm. B. Eerdmans Publishing Co.
