= William Kent (American politician) =

American politician (1864–1928)

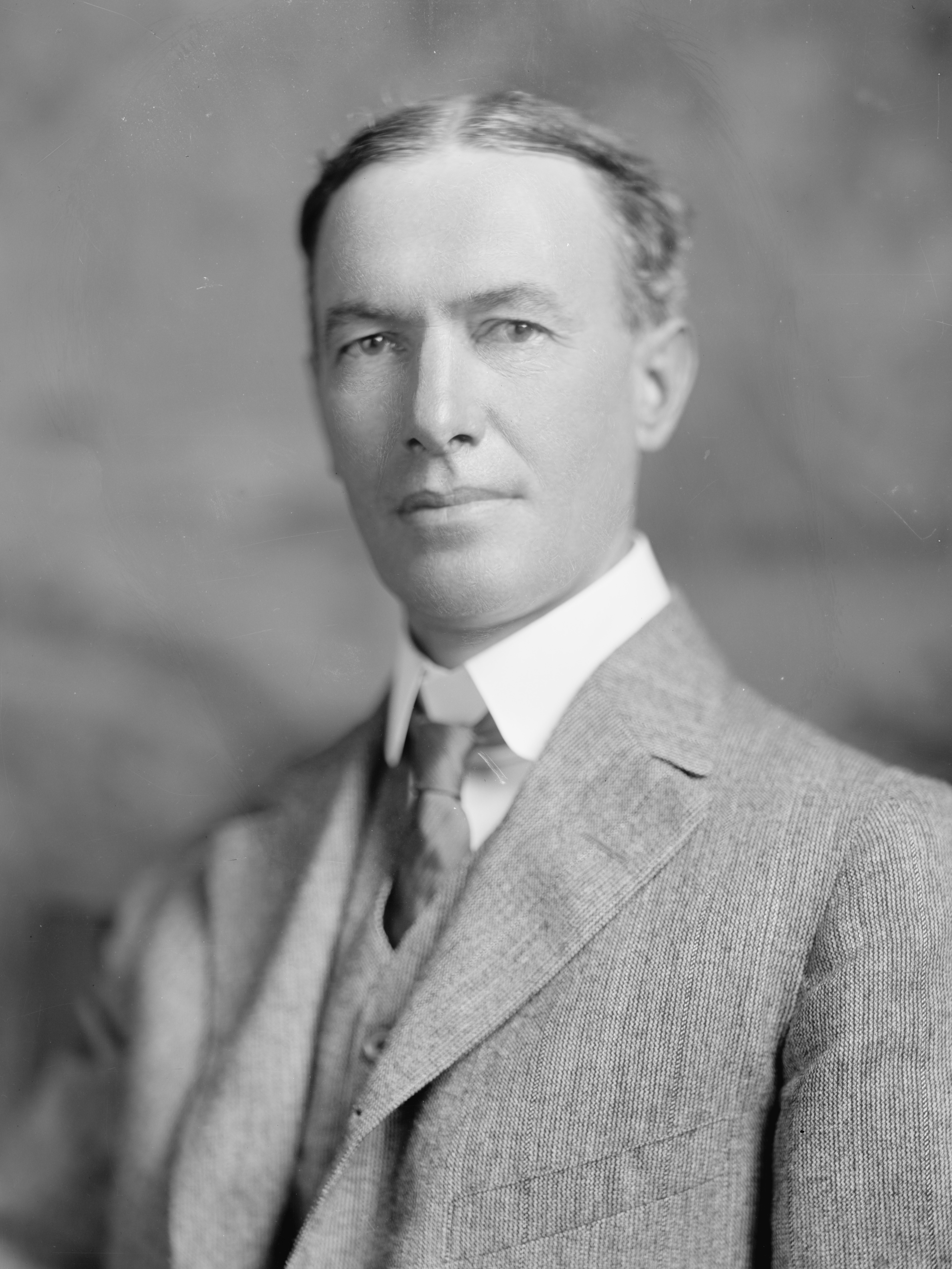
- Kent c. 1911–1917

Member of the U.S. House of Representatives from California
- In office March 4, 1911 – March 3, 1917
- Preceded by: Duncan E. McKinlay
- Succeeded by: Clarence F. Lea
- Constituency: 2nd district (1911–1913); 1st district (1913–1917)

Personal details
- Born: March 29, 1864 Chicago, Illinois, US
- Died: March 13, 1928 (aged 63) Kentfield, California, US
- Party: Progressive Republican; Independent
- Spouse: Elizabeth Thacher Kent
- Education: Yale University

William Kent (March 29, 1864 – March 13, 1928) was an American politician, conservationist and philanthropist from Marin County, California. He served three terms as a U.S. representative from Northern California between 1911 and 1917, and was instrumental in the creation of Muir Woods National Monument.

== Early life ==
Kent was born in Chicago, Illinois, on March 29, 1864. His parents, Adaline Elizabeth Dutton and meatpacking magnate Albert Emmett Kent (A.E. Kent) moved the family to Marin County in California in 1871, where his father had purchased 800 acres of valley land that would later become the town of Kentfield, California.

He graduated from Yale University in 1887, where he was a member of Skull and Bones.

Following graduation from Yale, Kent returned to Chicago and took up his father's real estate and livestock businesses, where he had inherited, among other interests, a tenement block adjacent to the Hull House settlement. After he was attacked as a slumlord in an 1894 speech by a Hull House resident, Kent donated the tenements to Hull House, which would later raze the property to build one of the first public playgrounds in the United States.

Kent became a donor and volunteer at Hull House, and served on its Board of Trustees, where he would meet Jane Addams and other leading Chicago reformers. Kent subsequently ran successfully for alderman in 1895 and founded the Municipal Voter's League of Chicago in 1896, a group that used publicity to push corrupt politicians from office.

== U.S. House of Representatives ==
In 1907, Kent returned to California from Chicago and entered federal politics by winning election in 1910 as a progressive Republican to the 62nd United States Congress. For the 63rd and 64th Congresses, Kent was re-elected as an independent. In total, Kent served in Congress from March 4, 1911, to March 4, 1917.

Kent was a vocal proponent of anti-Asian and exclusionary immigration policies throughout his political career. Campaigning in 1910, Kent told the Asiatic Exclusion League that "I have made a large part of my campaign on the Asiatic Exclusion idea, comparing it with the racial troubles brought on by the needless importation of negroes." In Congress, Kent pushed legislation barring Asian immigrants from owning land, becoming U.S. citizens, and entering the United States altogether. Kent also supported legislation instituting a literacy test for prospective immigrants, explaining he would "rather have a test of blood and race, and confine our immigration to northern Europe, but failing that, the literacy test."

== Conservationist ==
In 1916, Kent was the lead sponsor of legislation in the House of Representatives establishing the National Park Service, with companion legislation in the Senate sponsored by Reed Smoot. The legislation passed the House of Representatives on July 1, 1916, passed the Senate on August 5, and was signed by President Woodrow Wilson on August 25, 1916.

Kent was also responsible for the establishment of Muir Woods National Monument on 611 acres of land along Redwood Creek that Kent and his wife Elizabeth Thacher Kent had originally purchased in 1905 for $45,000 in an effort to preserve the property's groves of old-growth redwoods. After a local water company began condemnation proceedings in 1907 in an effort to create a reservoir on the site, Kent quickly deeded 295 acres of the property to the U.S. Department of the Interior for the establishment of a national monument under the recently passed Antiquities Act. Established as a national monument by President Theodore Roosevelt on January 6, 1908, Kent asked the site be named in honor of conservationist John Muir.

Beyond Muir Woods, Kent's efforts to preserve land on Marin County's Mount Tamalpais led to the creation of the Marin Municipal Water District in 1912, which utilized land donated by Kent for its watershed. Accordingly, a lake located in the northwest of the watershed, Kent Lake, is named for him.

Kent's efforts as a conservationist were not exclusive of development and growth. The establishment of Muir Woods as a national monument coincided with the development of the Mt. Tamalpais & Muir Woods Railway as a popular tourist attraction, a business in which both Kent and his father had an interest in. In Congress, Kent was a key proponent of 1913 legislation creating the Hetch-Hetchy Reservoir, a stance that ultimately cost him his personal friendship with John Muir, whom Kent would call "a man entirely without social sense."

== Later career ==
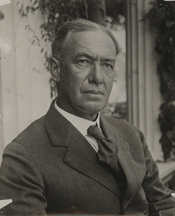
Kent later in life

After leaving Congress, Kent was appointed by President Woodrow Wilson to the United States Tariff Commission in 1917. In lobbying the Wilson administration for his appointment, Kent alluded to a possible run for governor of California, writing Wilson ally Norman Hapgood that "I probably could secure the governorship here if I wanted it, but I do not like the idea of getting down to state matters when my view has been directed at national affairs." Kent served on the Tariff Commission until his resignation in 1920 to make an unsuccessful run for the U.S. Senate.

== Personal life and death ==
Kent was married to Elizabeth Sherman Thacher on February 26, 1890. Elizabeth Thacher Kent was the daughter of Yale professor and administrator Thomas Anthony Thacher. Together they had seven children including sons Sherman Kent (Yale professor and alumnus of the US Central Intelligence Agency) and Roger Kent, who became a Democratic politician. His daughter was prominent artist Adaline Kent. Sherman Day Thacher was his brother-in-law.

Kent died on March 13, 1928, in Kentfield, California, from pneumonia, and his remains were cremated in Oakland, California. He was survived by his wife, five sons, two daughters, and ten grandchildren.

== Electoral history ==
1910 United States House of Representatives elections in California, 2nd district
Party	Candidate	Votes	%
Republican	William Kent	25,346	50.1
Democratic	I. G. Zumwalt	22,229	44.0
Socialist	W. H. Ferber	2,647	5.2
Prohibition	Henry P. Stipp	329	0.7
Total votes		50,451	100.0
Turnout			
Republican hold			

1912 United States House of Representatives elections
Party	Candidate	Votes	%
Independent	William Kent	20,341	37.3
Democratic	I. G. Zumwalt	18,756	34.4
Republican	Edward H. Hart	10,585	19.4
Socialist	Joseph Bredsteen	4,892	9.0
Total votes		54,574	100.0
Independent gain from Democratic			

1914 United States House of Representatives elections
Party	Candidate	Votes	%
Independent	William Kent (Incumbent)	35,403	48.1
Republican	Edward H. Hart	28,166	38.3
Democratic	O. F. Meldon	7,987	10.8
Prohibition	Henry P. Stipp	2,068	2.8
Total votes		73,624	100.0
Independent hold			

U.S. House of Representatives
Preceded by Duncan E. McKinlay	Member of the U.S. House of Representatives from California's 2nd congressional district 1911–1913	Succeeded by John E. Raker
Preceded by John Raker	Member of the U.S. House of Representatives from California's 1st congressional district 1913–1917	Succeeded by Clarence F. Lea
