= Robert Boardman Howard =

American muralist and sculpture (1896–1983)

- Born: September 20, 1896; New York City, U.S.
- Died: February 18, 1983 (aged 86); Santa Cruz, California, U.S.
- Other names: Robert Howard, Robert B. Howard, Bob Howard
- Education: California College of the Arts, Art Students League of New York, Académie Colarossi, Académie de la Grande Chaumière
- Known for: Sculpture
- Spouse: Adaline Kent (m. 1930–1957)
- Parents: John Galen Howard (father); Mary Robertson Bradbury (mother)
- Relatives: John Langley Howard (brother)

Robert Boardman Howard (September 20, 1896 – February 18, 1983) was an American artist. He is known for his graphic art, watercolors, oils, and murals, as well as his Art Deco bas-reliefs and his Modernist sculptures and mobiles.

== Early life and education ==
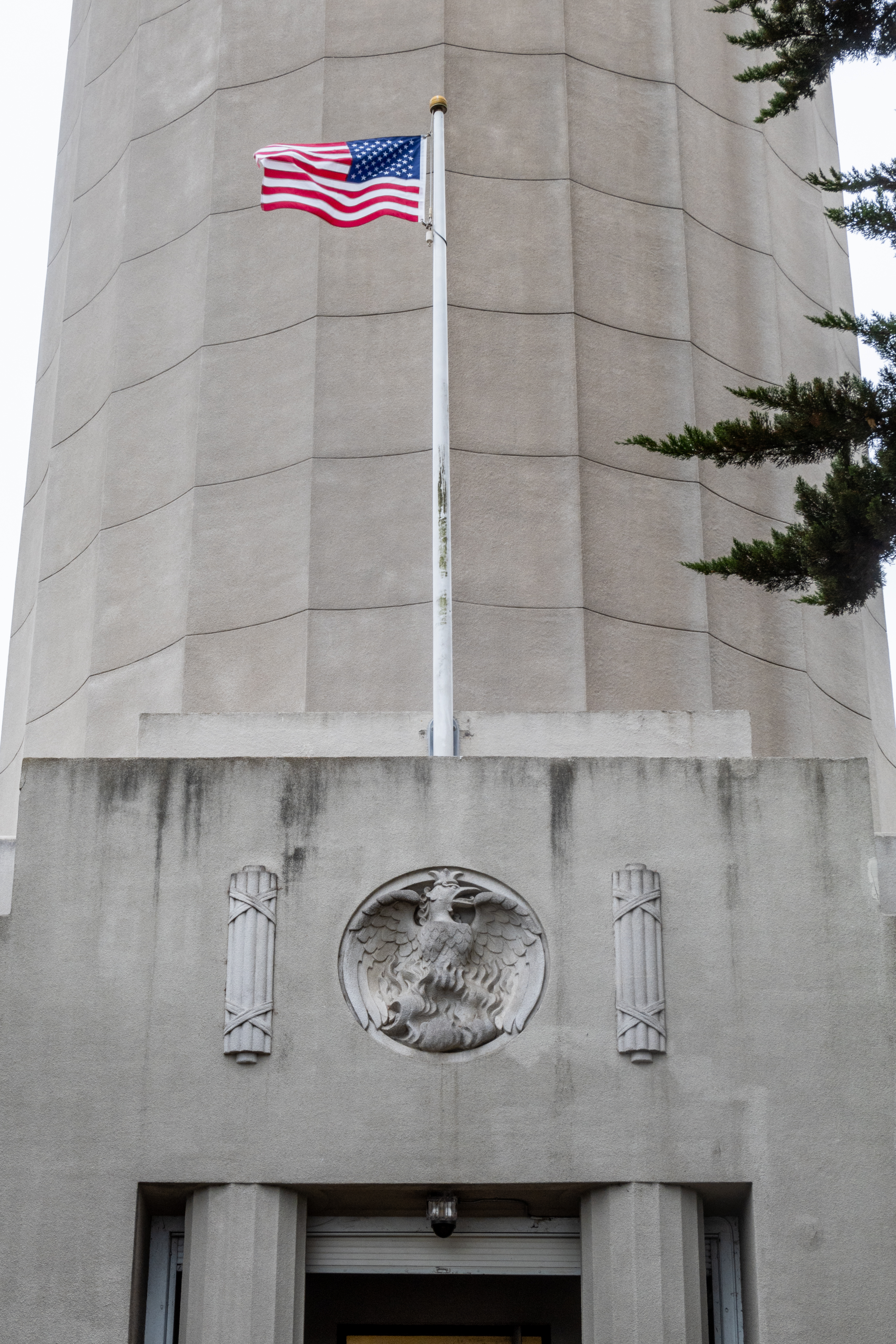
Boardman's cast concrete relief of a phoenix (1933), above the main entrance to Coit Tower

One of the two reliefs comprising Power and Light (1948), Howard's cast concrete sculpture at Pacific Gas and Electric Substation, San Francisco, California

Howard was born in New York City on September 20, 1896, to artist Mary Robertson Bradbury (1864–1963) and architect John Galen Howard as the second of five children. His siblings included Social Realist muralist John Langley Howard (1902–1999); Abstract-Surrealist painter, Charles Houghton Howard (1899–1978); architect, Henry Temple Howard (1894–1967) and Jeanette Howard Wallace (1905–1998).

When he was six years old, the family moved to Northern California. They settled in Berkeley, where John Galen Howard was hired to supervise the erection of the Hearst Memorial Mining Building at the University of California, Berkeley. Robert completed grammar school, but dropped out of Berkeley High School and was tutored privately by Arthur Upham Pope with a focus on art history.

Between 1913 and 1916, he studied under Xavier Martinez, Eric Spencer Macky, Worth Ryder, and Perham Wilhelm Nahl at California School of Arts and Crafts (today's California College of the Arts) in Berkeley. He became acquainted with Alexander Calder in 1915 during the Panama–Pacific International Exposition. After graduation Howard traveled across country, first stopping at an artist colony in Woodstock, New York, where he participated in an early Maverick Festival near Woodstock. Later he moved to New York City, and continued his training at the Art Students League of New York studying under Kenneth Hayes Miller, and F. Luis Mora.

He returned to California in 1917, joined the United States Army Signal Corps, and was sent to France. At the end of World War I he studied in Koblenz with the American printmaker George Taylor Plowman, and in Paris at the Academie Colarossi and the Academie de la Grand Chaumiere. He again met Alexander Calder and the two traveled together. One of Howard's paintings, The Road to Hell, was accepted to the 1920 Salon in Paris and was later exhibited in San Francisco.

== Career ==
In February 1923, he found employment at the firm of J. H. Keefe in San Francisco making architectural ornaments. He crested several stage sets for the Berkeley Playhouse.

In summer 1924, Howard joined his former art teacher Worth Ryder, and artist Chiura Obata on a three months camping and sketching trip to the High Sierra Nevada country in California. He created carvings and a series of watercolors as a result of this trip.

In March 1925, his display of Modernist paintings and sculpture at San Francisco's Galerie des Beaux Arts created much interest as well as a storm of controversy over the "unfortunate nude" in his painting Misfortune in a Hayfield. Howard dismissed the hullabaloo and asserted his right to artistic freedom. That summer, after he completed ornaments for the new Temple Emanuel in San Francisco and for the First Congregational Church in Oakland, he traveled to Europe to study Romanesque sculpture. By December 1926, he had returned to the San Francisco Bay Area via New York City, and accepted several commissions to paint decorative mural maps for the bay ferries. The following spring and summer he exhibited frequently in Berkeley and San Francisco. He also began to experiment with articulated sculptures and created for the Puppet Players Theatre a series of marionettes, which were praised by the master puppeteer James Blanding Sloan. Most of 1928 was spent on a grand tour around the world. His letters describing adventures in Europe, the Middle East, India, Ceylon, and Indonesia were serialized in The Argus newspaper. In January 1929, the Galerie des Beaux Arts staged a one-man show of his recent drawings, watercolors, and carvings to rave reviews.

Three of the Howard brothers and two of their wives held a joint exhibition in the spring of 1935 at San Francisco's Paul Elder Gallery, where Robert's pastels and paintings were enthusiastically received. At the start of World War II he worked at the Camouflage Research Laboratories. Despite the challenges of his ever-increasing deafness, he began teaching in 1944 at the California School of Fine Arts (today's San Francisco Art Institute) and at Mills College in Oakland, where he was placed on the staff of the prestigious Creative Arts Workshop. In October 1947 he premiered his non-objective art film Meta, which depicted the slow-motion action of various colors dropped into water.

In January 1949, the University of California, Berkeley staged a massive retrospective exhibition of all facets of his art.

== Death and legacy ==
Robert Boardman Howard died on February 18, 1983, aged 86, in Santa Cruz, California. Howard's work is featured in many public museum collections including San Francisco Museum of Modern Art (SFMoMA), Oakland Museum of California, the Fine Arts Museums of San Francisco, Addison Gallery of American Art at Phillips Academy, Rhode Island School of Design Museum, Nora Eccles Harrison Museum of Art, Kresge College at UC Santa Cruz, among others.

== Personal life ==
Howard was married to fellow artist Adaline Kent on August 5, 1930, after they worked together on the Pacific Stock Exchange building, a Miller and Pflueger architecture firm project. The couple had two children, Ellen and Galen. Adaline died on March 1, 1957, in an auto accident.

== Work ==
Works by Robert Boardman Howard
Year	Title	Location	Artist(s)	Material(s)	Notes
1927	Mural Room	Ahwahnee Hotel, Yosemite National Park	Robert Boardman Howard	Mural on painted linen (toile pente wallpaper)	
1929–1930		San Francisco Stock Exchange and the Stock Exchange Lunch Club, San Francisco, California	Robert Boardman Howard	Decorative reliefs, murals, brass banister for the staircase	Featured on the interior doors, windows and ceiling beams. Six relief panels in the trading room, and a carved door for the board room.
1931–1932		Paramount Theatre, Oakland, California	Robert Boardman Howard, Ralph Stackpole	Decorative reliefs (also called graffito-work)	Featured on the auditorium walls, stage, and ceiling.
1933	Phoenix	Coit Tower, San Francisco, California	Robert Boardman Howard	Bas-relief, cast concrete	Located above the main entrance
1939	The Whales	City College of San Francisco, San Francisco, California	Robert Boardman Howard	Fountain, cast composite of concrete and black granite	Originally sculpted for the Golden Gate International Exposition, and it later it lived in front of the California Academy of Sciences.
1939		Golden Gate International Exposition, San Francisco, California	Robert Boardman Howard	Murals	Four massive murals and assorted sculptures in the Brazil Building, California Building, Western State Building, and Ghirardelli Building.
1948	Power and Light	Pacific Gas and Electric Substation, San Francisco, California	Robert Boardman Howard	Two bas-relief in cast concrete	
1950	Multiple Compass	San Francisco Museum of Modern Art, San Francisco, California	Robert Boardman Howard	Air-kinetic sculpture made of balsa wood, linen, pigmented adhesive, acrylic and stainless steel	
c.1950		Berkeley High School Community Theatre, Berkeley, California	Robert Boardman Howard, Jacques Schnier	Multiple bas-reliefs	Located on the exterior of the building, Art Deco-style and very large sized.
c.1958	Hydro-Gyro	San Jose IBM Research Center, San Jose, California	Robert Boardman Howard	Water-kinetic sculpture	One of his largest works standing at 40-foot-high, and three-tiered.
1964	Undine	Mrs. Clinton Walker House, Carmel Point, California	Robert Howard	Crushed stone and copper ore sculpture. It sits on a base that can be rotated for viewing.	The 5 feet 7 inches (1.70 m) sculpture is on the deck of the Mrs. Clinton Walker House.
1973	Naked Man	UC Santa Cruz's Kresge College, Santa Cruz, California	Robert Boardman Howard		Naked man hangs from a rope anchored to the side of Kresge Town Hall.

== Exhibitions ==
For a more complete list, including some reviews and exhibited titles, see note

- 1920 - Salons des Artistes Français, Paris, France;
- 1921-1951 - Palace of Fine Arts, San Francisco, California;
- 1921-1972 (with prizes in 1923, 1924, 1925, 1941, 1943, 1944, 1946) San Francisco Art Association Annuals, San Francisco, California;
- 1922 – Salons of America, New York, New York;
- 1922-1924 - Annual Exhibitions of the Arts & Crafts Club, Carmel-by-the-Sea, California;
- 1923 – National Sculpture Society (N.S.S.), New York;
- 1923 - Western Painters of Southern California, Los Angeles, California;
- 1923 - Print Rooms (Robert Howard's first one-man exhibition), San Francisco, California;
- 1923-1930 - The League of Fins Arts, Berkeley, California;
- 1923-1933 – Gallerie des Beaux Arts, San Francisco, California;
- 1923-1947 – Oakland Art Gallery, Oakland, California;
- 1927 - American Institute of Graphic Arts, Oakland, California;
- 1927 - California State Fair, Sacramento, California;
- 1927 - Boston Art Club, Boston, Massachusetts;
- 1927 - American Institute of Architects, San Francisco, California;
- 1927-1928 Modern Gallery Group at the East-West Gallery, San Francisco, California;
- 1932-1948 – California Palace of the Legion of Honor (C.P.L.H), San Francisco, California;
- 1933 - Gump's Gallery, San Francisco, California;
- 1935-1976 – San Francisco Museum of Art (SFMA), California;
- 1936-1947 - Art Institute of Chicago, Chicago;
- 1937 – Corcoran Gallery of Art, Washington, D.C.;
- 1937, 1941, 1943, 1944 – San Francisco Art Association First Medal for Sculpture
- 1939 – World's Fair, New York, New York;
- 1939 – Golden Gate International Exposition (G.G.I.E.), San Francisco, California;
- 1943-1950 – de Young Museum, San Francisco, California;
- 1948-1955 – Whitney Museum of American Art, New York, New York;
- 1949 – Retrospective, University of California at Berkeley, California;
- 1951 - Metropolitan Museum of Art, New York, New York;
- 1951-1955 – São Paulo, Brazil;
- 1956 – 1956 Annual Exhibition of Contemporary American Sculpture, Watercolors and Drawings, Whitney Museum of American Art, New York City, New York;
- 1962 - World's Fair, Seattle, Washington;
- 1962-1964 – Salon de Mai, Paris, France;
- 1969-1974 – Oakland Museum of California, Oakland, California.
- 1971 – San Francisco Art Commission, San Francisco, California;

== Awards and honors ==
- 1925 – Ann Bremer prize for painting "Mount Tamalpais", San Francisco Art Association;
- 1946 – "for Eyrie," San Francisco Art Association;
- 1951 – "Night Watch," San Francisco Art Commission;
- 1955 – "Rocket," San Francisco Art Institute.
- 2013 – Preservation Award, Art Deco Society of California

=== Membership ===
California Society Mural Artists, San Francisco Art Institute, San Francisco Museum of Art (SFMA), UC Berkeley Art Museum, Museum of Modern Art (MoMA).
