= D. Andrew Kille =

American biblical scholar (1950–2018)

D. Andrew Kille (January 6, 1950 – June 30, 2018) was an American writer, teacher, biblical scholar and interfaith activist.

== Early life and education ==
Kille was born January 6, 1950, in Ventura, California. He studied at Ojai Valley School and The Thacher School in Ojai, California, before he entering Stanford University. He graduated in 1971 with a degree in English literature, and attended the American Baptist Seminary of the West in Berkeley, California, where he received his M.Div degree.

He served as a pastor at the Grace Baptist Church in San Jose, California, for fifteen years, before returning to school. He received the first Ph.D. granted in Psychological biblical criticism from the Graduate Theological Union in 1997. His interest in psychology and the Bible began during his years as a pastor and was nurtured through the work of Morton Kelsey, John A. Sanford, Elizabeth Howes and the Guild for Psychological Studies, and Carl Jung. He has contributed to several volumes of psychological biblical criticism.

Kille served as both co-chair and chair of the psychology and Biblical studies section of the Society of Biblical Literature. In 2007, he was named Editor of The Bible Workbench, a study resource on the Bible rooted in a psychologically informed approach, published by The Educational Center in Charlotte, N.C.

Kille died on June 30, 2018, of pancreatic cancer.

== Writings ==
=== Books ===
- A Cry Instead of Justice: The Bible and Cultures of Violence in Psychological Perspective, co-edited with Dereck Daschke. (T & T Clark, 2010 ISBN 978-0-567-02724-5)
- Psychological Insight into the Bible: Texts and Readings (Wm. B. Eerdmans, 2007 ISBN 978-0-8028-4155-1), co-edited with Wayne G. Rollins.
- Psychological Biblical Criticism (Fortress Press, 2001 ISBN 978-0-8006-3246-5) (in the Guides to Biblical Scholarship series)

=== Articles ===
- "Psychological Biblical Interpretation." Pages 149–157 in vol. 2 of The Oxford Encyclopedia of Biblical Interpretation. Edited by Steve Mackenzie. 2 vols. Oxford: Oxford University Press. 2013.
- "Psychological Biblical Criticism," Pages 137–153 in New Meanings for Ancient Texts: Recent Approaches to Biblical Criticisms and their Applications. Edited by Steven L. McKenzie and John Kaltner. Louisville: Westminster John Knox Press, 2013.
- "Analytical Psychology and Biblical Interpretation: Jung and the Bible," Pages 7–20 in Psychological Hermeneutics on Biblical Themes and Texts; New Directions in Biblical Study: A Festscrift Honoring the Work of Wayne G. Rollins. Edited by J. Harold Ellens. T & T Clark, 2012.
- "Bibliaolvasás Három Dimenzióban: A Pzichológiai Bibliaértelmezés (Reading the Bible in Three Dimensions: Psychological Biblical Interpretation)." Sapientiana 4, no. 1 (2011): 44-59 (Hungarian translation)
- "Psychology and Biblical Studies." In New Interpreters Dictionary of the Bible, (Nashville: Abingdon, 2008, p. ).
- "Imitating Christ: Jesus as a Model in Cognitive Learning Theory." In Text and Community:, Ed. J. Harold Ellens. (Sheffield: Sheffield Phoenix, 2007).
- "Unconsciously Poisoning Our Roots: Psychological Dynamics of the Bible in Jewish/ Christian Conflict." Pastoral Psychology 53, no. 4 (March 22, 2005): 291–301.
- "More Reel Than Real: Mel Gibson's The Passion of the Christ." Pastoral Psychology 53, no. 4 (2005): 341–50.
- "Psychological Interpretation." In Dictionary for the Theological Interpretation of the Bible, ed.Kevin Vanhoozer, N.T. Wright, Craig Bartholomew and Daniel Treier. (Grand Rapids: Baker Academic, 2005, p. 653-5).
- ""The Bible Made Me Do It:" Text, Interpretation and Violence." In The Destructive Power of Religion, ed. J. Harold Ellens. 55-73. Westport, CT: Praeger, 2004.
- "The Day of the Lord from a Jungian Perspective: Amos 5:18-20." In Psychology and the Bible: A New Way to Read the Scriptures, edited by J. Harold Ellens and Wayne G. Rollins. (Westport, CT: Greenwood-Praeger, 2004, pp. 267–76).
- "Jacob: A Study in Individuation." In Psychology and the Bible: A New Way to Read the Scriptures, Ellens & Rollins, pp. 65–82.
- "Reading the Bible in Three Dimensions: Psychological Biblical Interpretation." In Psychology and the Bible: A New Way to Read the Scriptures, Ellens & Rollins, pp. 17–32.

== Interreligious work ==
In addition to his work in psychological biblical criticism, Kille has been active for over 30 years in interfaith dialogue. He is founder and director of Interfaith Space in San Jose, California, and also serves as editor of Bay Area Interfaith Connect, the newsletter of the Interfaith Center at the Presidio in San Francisco, California.

In 2009, Kille was awarded the Building Bridges Award by ING, a San Jose-based group which sponsors an Interfaith Speakers Bureau to educate people on issues of interfaith relations. Kille serves as an advisor to ING.

Kille was chair of the group that worked to create SiVIC, the Silicon Valley Interreligious Council in 2011, and serves as chair of the SiVIC board.
