= James Crawford Biggs =

American lawyer and politician (1872–1960)

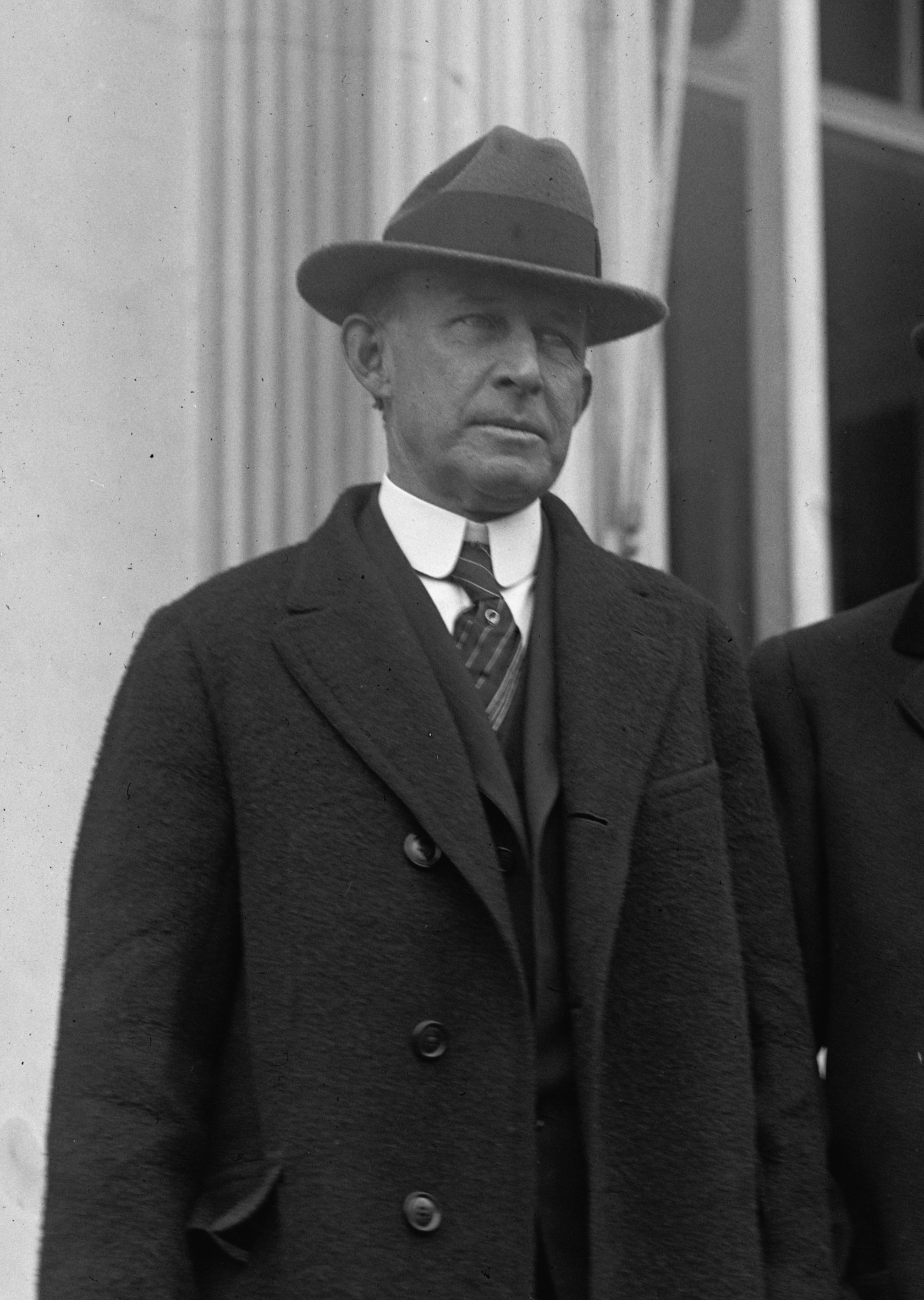

22nd United States Solicitor General
- In office May 5, 1933 – March 24, 1935
- President: Franklin D. Roosevelt
- Preceded by: Thomas D. Thacher
- Succeeded by: Stanley Forman Reed

Member of the North Carolina House of Representatives from Durham County
- In office 1905

Personal details
- Born: August 29, 1872 Oxford, North Carolina, U.S.
- Died: January 30, 1960 (aged 87) Wake County, North Carolina, U.S.
- Party: Democratic
- Education: University of North Carolina at Chapel Hill
- Occupation: Lawyer; politician
- Football career

North Carolina Tar Heels
- Position: End
- Class: 1892

Personal information
- Listed height: 5 ft 9 in (1.75 m)
- Listed weight: 145 lb (66 kg)

Career information
- College: North Carolina (1892)

Awards and highlights
- Southern championship (1892)

James Crawford Biggs (August 29, 1872 – January 30, 1960) was an American lawyer and politician, born in Oxford, North Carolina, to William and Elizabeth Arlington (née Cooper) Biggs.

== Education ==
Biggs was a student at the Horner Military School in Oxford from 1883 to 1887 before attending the University of North Carolina at Chapel Hill. He was an end on North Carolina's first great football team in 1892. Biggs graduated summa cum laude from the University of North Carolina (UNC) in 1893 with a bachelor's degree in philosophy. He was a member of Zeta Psi fraternity as well as the scholastic honors fraternity, Phi Beta Kappa. Biggs studied law at University of North Carolina Law School from 1893 to 1894 and was admitted to the North Carolina bar in 1894. He began a law practice in his hometown of Oxford, while teaching simultaneously as a professor at UNC (1898–1900) and Trinity Law School (1911–1912), in Durham, NC. From 1894 to 1898, Biggs also served as an adjutant in the North Carolina state guard.

== Political and legal career ==
Biggs was elected to serve two terms as the mayor of Oxford in 1897 and 1898. In 1899, he helped found the North Carolina Bar Association, which he served as its first Secretary-Treasurer, and later served as president (1914–1915). He served as a member of the North Carolina House of Representatives from Durham County in 1905. He continued his ascendency in the North Carolina legal system, serving as a state supreme court reporter (1905–1907), and then as a judge of the Superior Court of North Carolina, from 1907 to 1911. He resigned from this position in 1911 in order to resume private law practice in Raleigh, NC. From 1917 to 1918, Biggs was given an opportunity to litigate on the federal level when he was chosen to be a special assistant to the U.S. Attorney General in charge of oil litigation against the Southern Pacific Railroad in California.

President Franklin D. Roosevelt appointed Biggs Solicitor General in May 1933, at the start of the New Deal. Biggs was well out of his depth in his new position, and lost 10 of the 17 cases he argued in his first five months in office. By the end of his first term, Justice Stone commented that "Biggs was not fit to argue a cow case before a justice of the peace, unless the cow was fatally sick." According to former Solicitor General Seth Waxman, "[t]he Justices informally sent word to [President] Roosevelt that Biggs should not be permitted to argue any case the United States hoped to win. Attorney General Homer Cummings stepped in to ensure that important cases would be handled by attorneys outside the Solicitor General's office. Thus, even before the first New Deal case was argued in the Supreme Court, the Solicitor General—the person whose principal responsibility it is to represent the interests of the United States—was out. By the time a more capable successor took office, the New Deal was in deep legal trouble." (Cummings and Assistant Solicitor General Angus D. MacLean argued the Gold Clause Cases, which eventually marked some of the first successes for New Deal economic policies.) Biggs resigned on March 14, 1935. His successor (and future Supreme Court Justice) Stanley Reed was named his replacement on March 18 and confirmed by the Senate on March 25. Reed immediately set about dismissing several cert petitions filed by the government (e.g., Belcher v. United States) because the cases were poorly postured to result in opinions upholding the New Deal.

Biggs returned to private practice in Raleigh in March 1935. Soon afterward, the government called upon Biggs for his expertise to assist the attorney general in the Northern Pacific Land Grant Case. He also served as chairman on the North Carolina Board of Elections, trustee of the UNC Methodist Orphanage, and a member of the executive committee and counsel of the American Red Cross, 1933–1935.

== Family and death ==
He was married to Margie Jordan for 53 years, with whom he had one daughter, Marjorie. James Biggs died on January 30, 1960, at his home in Raleigh, North Carolina.

Legal offices
| Preceded by Thomas D. Thacher | Solicitor General; 1933–1935 | Succeeded by Stanley Forman Reed |
