= Margaret Thatcher (disambiguation) =

Margaret Thatcher (1925–2013) was Prime Minister of the United Kingdom from 1979 to 1990.

Margaret Thatcher may also refer to:

== In fiction ==
- Inspector Margaret Thatcher, a character on the television series Due South
- Margaret Thatcher, a character in the television series The Adventures of Tom Sawyer
- "Margaret Thatcher", an episode of The Mindy Project

== Other ==
- Margaret Doris "Margot" Thatcher (née Kempson, 1918–1996), first wife of Denis Thatcher

== See also ==
- Iron Lady (disambiguation)
- Thatcher (disambiguation)
