= Eisegesis =

Interpreting text as to introduce one's own presuppositions

Eisegesis (/ˌaɪsɪˈdʒiːsɪs/) is the process of interpreting text in such a way as to introduce one's own presuppositions, agendas or biases. It is commonly referred to as reading into the text. It is often done to justify or confirm a position already held.

Eisegesis is best understood when contrasted with exegesis. Exegesis is drawing out a text's meaning in accordance with the author's context and discoverable meaning. Eisegesis is when a reader imposes their interpretation of the text. Thus exegesis tends to be objective; and eisegesis, highly subjective.

Although the terms eisegesis and exegesis are commonly heard in association with biblical interpretation, both (especially exegesis) are used across literary disciplines.

== In biblical study ==
While exegesis is an attempt to determine the historical context within which a particular verse exists—the so-called "Sitz im Leben" or life setting—eisegetes often neglect this aspect of biblical study.

Protestants and fundamentalist Christians have likewise accused Catholic and Orthodox Christians of eisegesis for viewing Scripture through Holy Tradition, and may accuse them of fabricating or distorting tradition to support their view, which they see as opposed to the doctrine of sola scriptura, where scripture is believed to speak for itself without Holy Tradition. Jews, in turn, might assert that Christians practice eisegesis when they read the Hebrew Bible as anticipating Jesus of Nazareth.

== In a secular context ==
At some universities in the United Kingdom, the United States, Canada, Australia, New Zealand, and Hong Kong, the exegesis forms part of the required work for fine arts doctorates, including creative writing doctorates. A scholarly text accompanies a creative work, such as a film, novel, poetry, or other artistic output by the PhD candidate. Together, the two elements form the candidate's research thesis. Paul Williams argues that creative writing doctoral students who "mistake the meaning of [their creative] work for its intended meaning" or who "attempt to justify [their] creative works using criteria and pre-conceived theoretical notions other than what arises from [the creative work] itself" may unwittingly write an eisegesis rather than an exegesis.

== See also ==
- Cafeteria Christianity
- Cherry picking
- Quoting out of context
- Authorial intent
