= Thomas Thacher =

American lawyer (1850–1919)

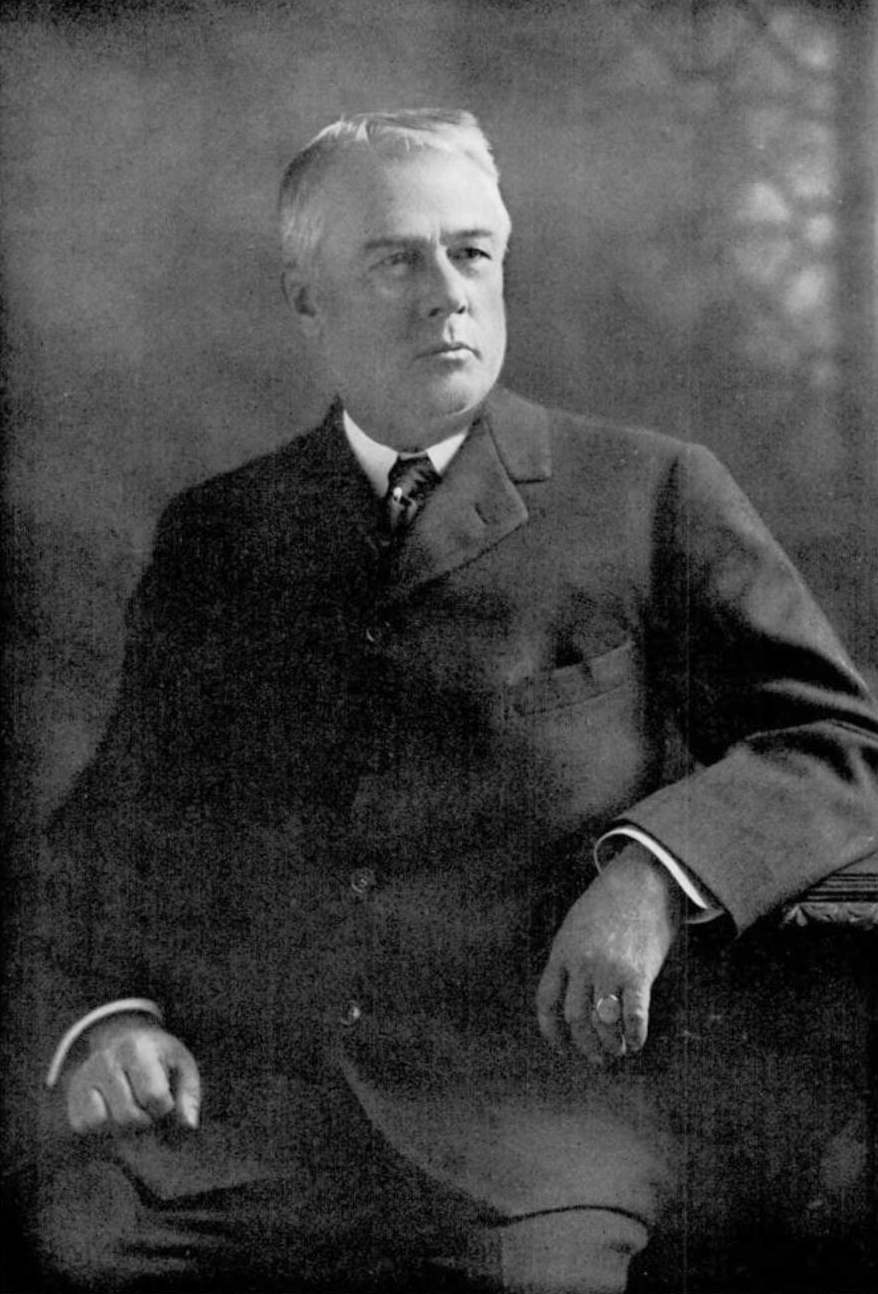
- Born: May 3, 1850; New Haven, Connecticut
- Died: July 30, 1919 (aged 69); Watch Hill, Rhode Island
- Education: Yale University (BA); Columbia University (LLB)
- Occupation: Lawyer
- Spouse: Sarah McCullough Green (m. 1880)
- Children: 4, including Thomas Day Thacher

Thomas Thacher (May 3, 1850 – July 30, 1919) was an American lawyer.

== Life ==
Thomas Thacher was born in New Haven, Connecticut, on May 3, 1850. He was a descendant of the Rev. Peter Thacher, the rector of St. Edmonds, Salisbury, England; and of his son, Thomas Thacher, who came to America in 1635, settled in Salem, Massachusetts, and later became the first minister of the Old South Church in Boston. His father, Thomas Anthony Thacher, (Yale BA 1835), was professor of Latin at Yale College from 1842 to 1886, and his mother, Elizabeth (Day) Thacher, was the daughter of Jeremiah Day (Yale BA 1795), president of Yale from 1817 to 1846, and Olivia (Jones) Day. On his mother's side he traced his ancestry to Robert Day, who emigrated from Ipswich, England in 1634, settled in Cambridge, Massachusetts, and in a few years removed to Connecticut and helped to found Hartford.

Thomas Thacher prepared for college at the Hopkins Grammar School before attending Yale University. He received a first prize for declamation in Sophomore year. His appointments were a high oration in Junior year and an oration in Senior year, graduating in 1871. He was a member of Phi Beta Kappa, Skull and Bones, and Brothers in Unity.

After graduation he taught for a year in the Hopkins Grammar School, and then spent a year in graduate study at Yale University. He entered the Columbia Law School in 1873, and graduated with a LL.B. in 1875, immediately upon graduation being admitted to the bar of New York, of which he became an active and influential member. His first professional association was with Ashbel Green, then one of the leaders of the New York Bar, with whom he collaborated in the preparation of Brice's Ultra Vires, which became a standard American work on corporation law.

After completing this work he was associated with Judge Green in the office of Alexander & Green, and later served as attorney for one of the largest mortgage companies in New York City. On January 1, 1884, he formed the firm of Simpson, Thacher & Barnum (now Simpson, Thacher & Bartlett), with John W. Simpson and William M. Barnum (B A. 1877) as partners. In this, and its successor firms, he was an active partner until his death. Among his partners were Philip G. Bartlett, Yale 1881; his brother, Alfred Beaumont Thacher, Yale 1874; Charles B. Eddy, Yale 1893; Graham Sumner, Yale 1897; Reeve Schley, Yale 1903; and his son, Thomas Day Thacher, Yale 1904.

During his forty-five years of active practice at the bar, the economic life of the country was undergoing a great transformation in the rapid development of production on a large scale. In preparing the structure of the new business organization Mr. Thacher had no small part, performing as he did, much of the legal work in connection with the organization of the Brooklyn Union Gas Company, the American Smelting & Refining Company, the Republic Iron & Steel Company, the American Sheet Steel Company, the American Steel Hoop Company, the American Can Company, the American Locomotive Company, the Railway Steel-Spring Company, and other large consolidations. He combined with such activities the work of a court lawyer, and often appeared before the courts in cases of importance. He was actively interested in the Bar Association of New York City, and for two years (1907–09) was its vice-president.

From 1887 to 1914, Mr. Thacher was a lecturer on corporations in the Yale School of Law. He was a frequent contributor to the law reviews. At the Yale Bicentennial, he was chosen to deliver the address on "Yale in Relation to Law." In 1903 Yale conferred upon him the degree of LL. D. He served as president of the Yale Alumni Association in New York from 1895 to 1897 and from that time until 1904 as president of the Yale Club of New York City. At the time of his death he was an honorary member of the club. He was one of the founders of the Yale Alumni University Fund and gave himself enthusiastically to the work of the Alumni Fund Association, of which he was chairman from 1894 to 1897 and a director for many years. From 1906 until his death he was a member of the Alumni Advisory Board. Thacher was also a vice president of the University Club of New York from 1910 to 1913 and a president from 1913 to 1919.

Mr. Thacher was married December 1, 1880, in New York City, to Sarah McCullough, daughter of Ashbel and Louise B. (Walker) Green, of Tenafly, who survived him with a son, Thomas Day Thacher (Yale BA 1904), and three daughters. Louise Green, who was married October 12, 1907, to Theodore Ives Driggs (Yale BA 1907); Sarah, who married Lewis Martin Richmond (Yale PhB 1903), September 19, 1908; and Elizabeth.

Thomas Thacher died at his daughter Sarah's home in Watch Hill, Rhode Island on July 30, 1919.

== Sources ==
- Yale Obituary Records, 1919–20, p. 1385.
