= Christian Association for Psychological Studies =

US organization

Christian Association for Psychological Studies (CAPS)
- Formation: 1956
- Headquarters: Box 365; Batavia, Illinois, United States
- 2010 President: Paul Regan, EdD
- Chair of the Board: John Eric Swenson, III, PhD
- Website: caps.net

The Christian Association for Psychological Studies (CAPS), founded in 1956, is an association of American Christians in the counseling and behavioral sciences. It holds a yearly conference and publishes the Journal of Psychology and Christianity, which is indexed in psychological and other scholarly databases.

== History ==
The founding of CAPS has been described as part of a recovery of interest in religion among psychologists. Ian Jones stated that CAPS provides alternatives to secular organizations such as the American Psychological Association.

== Development ==
CAPS has several chapters across the United States. Its publishing arm publishes books. Extensive information about the history of CAPS is available in a book published for CAPS' 50th anniversary, edited by Stevenson, Eck and Hill.
