= James Kingsley Thacher =

American educator (1847–1891)

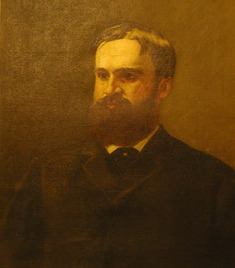
1892 oil painting of Thacher

James Kingsley Thacher (October 19, 1847 – April 20, 1891) was an American professor of medicine.

Thacher, the eldest child of Professor Thomas Anthony Thacher, was born in New Haven, Connecticut, on October 19, 1847. His mother was Elizabeth, daughter of Yale College President Jeremiah Day. He spent the first two years after graduation in 1868 in California, and then returned to New Haven for study. From 1871 to 1879 he held a tutorship at Yale, instructing primarily in Physics, and subsequently in Zoology, in which latter subject indeed he continued to provide instruction for College students down to 1888. In 1879 he was appointed Professor of Physiology in the Yale Medical School (where he had already taken the degree of M.D.), and in 1880 he entered on the general practice of medicine in New Haven. The subject of Clinical Medicine was added to his professorship in 1887. He was also an independent scientific investigator of distinguished merit. His best known piece of work was published in 1877, and involved a criticism of Huxley and Gegenbaur on vertebrate evolution, which attracted attention both in England and Germany. He also published other researches of value, but the demands of his practice and of the Medical School interfered seriously with the time at command for original work. He died in New Haven, after two days' illness, of pneumonia, on April 20, 1891, in his 44th year.

He was married, in Boston, September 10, 1878, to Emily Baldwin Foster, eldest daughter of the Hon. Dwight Foster, who survived him with their three children,—one daughter and two sons.
