= Thacker =

Thacker may refer to:

== People ==
Thacker is an occupational surname, originally denoting a "Thatcher".

Notable people with this surname include:

- Angela Thacker (born 1964), American long jumper
- Blaine Thacker (1941–2020), Member of Canadian Parliament
- Brian Thacker (born 1945), American army officer; recipient of the Medal of Honor for action during the Vietnam war
- Cathy Gillen Thacker (contemporary), American author of romance novels
- Charles M. Thacker (1866–1918), Justice of the Oklahoma Supreme Court
- Charles P. Thacker (1943–2017), American computer pioneer
- David Thacker (born 1950), English award-winning theatre director
- D. D. Thacker (1884–1961), Indian coal miner and philanthropist
- Edwin Thacker (1913–1974), South African athlete
- Eugene Thacker, American philosopher
- Frank Thacker (1876–1949), English footballer
- Gail Thacker (contemporary), avant-garde photographer and theater manager
- Harry Thacker, (born 1994), English rugby union footballer
- Henry Thacker (1870–1939), New Zealand physician and politician; member of Parliament 1914–22
- Herbert Cyril Thacker (1870–1953), Canadian army general; Chief of the General Staff 1927–29
- Jeremy Thacker, 18th-century writer and watchmaker
- Julie Thacker (contemporary), American television writer
- Lawrence Thacker, rugby league footballer of the 1930s and 1940s for England, and Hull
- Mary Rose Thacker (1922–1983), former Canadian singles figure skater
- Moe Thacker (1934–1997), American professional baseball player
- Paul D. Thacker (contemporary), American journalist in medical topics
- Ralph Thacker (1880–after 1915), American college football coach
- Ransley Thacker 1891–1965), British lawyer and judge
- Robert E. Thacker (1918–2020), American test pilot and model aircraft enthusiast
- Stephanie Thacker (born 1965), United States Circuit Judge
- Tab Thacker (1962–2007), American collegiate wrestler and actor
- Thomas Thacker (died 1548), steward of Thomas Cromwell, Repton Priory
- Tom Thacker (basketball) (born 1939), American professional basketball player
- Tom Thacker (musician) (born 1974) Canadian singer and lead guitarist

== Places ==
- Thacker, West Virginia, U.S.
  - Thacker Creek

== Other uses ==
- Thacker Shield, a rugby league football trophy
- Kevin Thacker, victim of a murder by a police officer in the 2008 true crime film The Coverup, previously known as The Thacker Case
- William Thacker, a fictional character in the 1999 film Notting Hill
- Thackers, a fictional farm in the novel A Traveller in Time by Alison Uttley
- Thakkar, an Indian surname, also spelled Thacker

== See also ==
- Thatcher (disambiguation)
