= The Thacher School =

Private school in Ojai, California, US

Location
- Ojai, California; United States; 34°27′54″N 119°10′57″W

Information
- Type: Private, independent, boarding
- Established: 1889
- Founder: Sherman Day Thacher
- Head of school: Jeff Hooper
- Faculty: 60
- Grades: 9–12
- Enrollment: 260
- Average class size: 11 students
- Student to teacher ratio: 6:1
- Campus: 540 acres (2.2 km^{2})
- Colors: Green and orange
- Athletics: 28 teams
- Mascot: Toad
- Nickname: Casa de Piedra
- Endowment: $206 million (2024)
- Website: www.thacher.org

The Thacher School is a private co-educational day and boarding school in Ojai, California. Founded in 1889 as a boys' school, it began admitting girls in 1977 and is California's oldest co-educational boarding school, as well as the oldest private boarding school west of the Mississippi River. The school educates approximately 250 students in grades 9–12, who come from 21 states and 12 countries.

Originally a ranch, Thacher's 540-acre campus supports formal horse and outdoors programs. School founder Sherman Day Thacher believed in the power of the outdoors to help shape students: "Come West, breathe deep, let these hills be your teachers." In 2019, the school's older buildings were listed on the U.S. National Register of Historic Places. Famous alumni include industrialist Howard Hughes and playwright Thornton Wilder.

== History and overview ==
=== Origins ===
In 1887, Sherman Day Thacher moved to the Casa de Piedra (CdeP) orange ranch in Nordhoff, California (later renamed to Ojai) with his brother, who was seeking a fresh air cure for his tuberculosis. Thacher's father Thomas was a professor at Yale, and in 1889, Thacher's friend Henry W. Farnam (another Yale professor) asked Thacher to tutor his son for Yale's entrance exams. Thacher agreed to do so, provided that the son move to California for his lessons. According to the Los Angeles Times, Thacher is the oldest private boarding school west of the Mississippi.

At CdeP, Thacher tutored the younger Farnam in both academics and maturity, blending classroom studies with outdoor living and horsemanship. Tuition was $14 a week, "washing excluded." Soon other friends were sending their sons out to California to receive Thacher's instruction, and a school was born. By 1900, Thacher had educated 45 students, and its advertisements counted the presidents of Yale, Harvard, Stanford, and Berkeley as references.

Thacher served as an inspiration (direct or indirect) for various other college-preparatory boarding schools. His Yale roommate Horace Dutton Taft visited CdeP in 1889, and Taft's experience helped crystallize his decision to found Connecticut's Taft School the following year. In addition, Curtis Cate taught English at Thacher in the 1900s before establishing Thacher's athletic rival Cate School in 1910. Due to the school's popularity, the admissions office was oversubscribed. As a result, Sherman Thacher encouraged Thompson Webb to move from Tennessee to Claremont, California and establish The Webb School of California, which opened in 1922.

Thacher incorporated the school as a nonprofit in 1924, but continued running the school until his death in 1931. He was succeeded by Morgan Barnes, who led the school for five years until Thacher's son Anson (CdeP 1923) was ready to take over. Anson Thacher served as head of school from 1936 to 1949, and was the last member of the Thacher family to lead the school. He continued teaching math at Thacher until 1970.

=== Horse and outdoor programs ===
When founding the school, Sherman Thacher imposed "the unusual requirement that each student must care for a horse," remarking that "there's something about the outside of a horse ... that's good for the inside of a boy." There was also a practical element to the horse program: "students had to ride the five-mile trek into [downtown] Ojai every day just to pick up the mail." As of 2023, the horse program requires students to ride and care for a horse during all athletic seasons their freshman year at Thacher, while students who join at later grades complete the requirement during one athletic season. An annual gymkhana event provides students the opportunity to demonstrate horsemanship in competition. Though Western-style riding is required, the Horse Program offers an English riding elective in grades 10–12.

As part of the Outdoors Program, students are encouraged to take weekend camping trips into the local mountains, in addition to week-long trips each fall and spring that include backpacking, rock climbing, cycling, sailing, horse camping, canyoneering, backcountry skiing and kayaking.

=== Evolution ===
Under Sherman Thacher, the size of the student body was limited to approximately 60 students. Anson Thacher expanded enrollment to 94 boys by the time of his retirement, but the school's primary period of expansion came in the 1960s and mid-1970s; the school educated 189 students by 1975. In 1977, Thacher began admitting female students.

=== Recent developments ===
From 1999 to 2008, Thacher conducted an $82 million fundraising campaign that both increased endowments for faculty salaries and student financial aid, and funded new buildings on campus (including a performing arts center, student commons, and dormitories).

The school launched a $160 million fundraising campaign in 2017. In 2018, Thacher reported that the campaign had helped grow the school endowment from $125 to $171 million. In 2020, Thacher further reported that its financial aid budget increased by 50.7% and the percentage of students on financial aid had increased by 5%. The campaign also funded a new academic building and dining hall, improved faculty housing, and a solar power facility that contributes more than 90% of the school's energy needs.

== Admissions and student body ==
In 2024, the school's admission rate was 16%. 79% of admitted students chose to enroll at Thacher. In 2016, Business Insider ranked Thacher as the most selective boarding school in the United States; that year, its admission rate was 12%.

In the 2024–25 school year, Thacher educated 225 boarders and 20 non-faculty day students. 45% of boarding students came from outside California, and 14% of students came from abroad. 31% of Thacher students received financial aid. The average award was $64,993, equivalent to 83% of boarding tuition.

== Academics ==
=== Curriculum ===
Thacher students engage in a rigorous, college preparatory curriculum and are required to complete four years of mathematics and English with three years of science, history, and a foreign language of choice, plus two years of art. Students must take five solid courses (defined as classes with substantial written homework) each term. Students are placed in and choose from more than 80 courses, ranging from English I to Advanced Music Theory. Classes such as Latin, Global Crises and Solutions, Astronomy Research, Modern Middle East, Advanced Actors Studio, Multivariable Calculus, Perspectives on Nature, Field Biology and Conservation are on offer.

Thacher uses the Harkness method in its classrooms. "Daily preparation, thoughtful participation, analytical thinking and intellectual rigor" are part of life in the Thacher classroom.

All seniors exhibit mastery on a topic by designing and researching a topic of choice. This Senior Exhibition must have an oral and written component and be presented to the Thacher community.

=== Test scores ===
For the class of 2023, Thacher reported a middle-50% SAT score range of 1300–1520 and an average ACT score of 30.

=== Observatory program ===
Thacher has an astronomical research program, where students participate in astrophysics research in collaboration with teams at Harvard, Boston University, the University of California, Santa Cruz, and the Las Cumbres Observatory.

The observatory was brought to campus in 1965 by Caltech and UCLA as part of the Summer Science Program. It was renovated in 2016 into a state-of-the-art, research-grade facility and now houses a PlaneWave CDK-700 telescope with a 0.7m aperture and a fully robotic dome. The observatory uses a flexible dispatch schedule for full automation.

== Campus and facilities ==
The campus, located in the foothills in the northeast corner of the Ojai Valley, about 85 miles north of Los Angeles, was originally the Casa de Piedra ranch. Buildings reflect a variety of architectural styles, including California Craftsman and Spanish Colonial Revival.

In addition to the normal boarding school mix of athletic facilities like a gymnasium, tennis courts, track, three fields, fitness center, and pool (although the pool is not used for athletic events), the campus has barns, pastures, arenas, and fields for equestrian use, including a network of trails that links the campus to the adjacent Los Padres National Forest. The school maintains base camps in the Sespe Wilderness and the Eastern Sierra's Golden Trout Wilderness, which it uses for backcountry trips, educational programs and alumni retreats. The school also hosts a game room, sand volleyball courts and two wellness centers.

== Mascot and traditions ==
While the Thacher School's symbol has always been the pegasus, its mascot is the toad, chosen, according to the founder's grandson, Nick Thacher, for its quiet humility and persistence.

== 2021–23 sexual misconduct investigation ==
=== Internal and county investigations ===
In 2020, reports of sexual misconduct at Thacher circulated on social media. In response, the school hired law firm Munger, Tolles & Olson (MTO) to investigate these reports and other allegations of misconduct. Thacher published MTO's 91-page report in June 2021 and a 168-page supplemental report in February 2023. As summarized by the Los Angeles Times, MTO investigators "laid out episodes of alleged rape, groping, unwanted touching and inappropriate comments dating back 40 years in a level of detail surprising for a private institution." Collectively, the reports identified ten alleged perpetrators by name, collected incidents related to other, unnamed, alleged perpetrators, and disclosed allegations that former school administrators covered up student complaints.

With respect to contemporary incidents, MTO said that it did not receive any "firsthand, credible reports" of sexual misconduct by current school employees. In 2023, Thacher disclosed that in 2021, a current Thacher student had made an allegation of student-on-student physical abuse, and the school administration had inadvertently (that is, "not due to any deliberate effort to obfuscate") delayed reporting the allegation to law enforcement for a period of months. The same year, the school had promptly reported a contemporary allegation of student-on-student sexual abuse.

In 2023, the Ventura County Sheriff's Office declined to file criminal charges, citing a variety of reasons, including the statute of limitations, a lack of proof for certain allegations, and victims who declined to press charges. Civil litigation is ongoing.

=== School response ===
Following publication of the 2021 report, the school's board of trustees issued a statement acknowledging that "many [students] suffered lasting harm not just from the sexual misconduct itself but also from the school’s handling of the misconduct." The board added that the school "tolerated and at times fostered a culture that valued the experiences and voices of boys and men over those of girls and women and that allowed sexual misconduct to be minimized, ignored, and dismissed."

The school created a support fund to help victims pay for therapy. It also revised its sexual misconduct reporting process and hired several outside organizations to train its administrators and staff on how to prevent further instances of abuse in the future. In addition, the board of trustees removed the names of two former heads of school from the campus dining hall, the athletic field, and a hiking trail. The first administrator had "fail[ed] to protect Thacher students from harm," and the second had been credibly accused of sexual misconduct.

Thacher's head of school resigned in August 2022. Jeff Hooper became the acting Head of School in 2021 and the permanent Head of School in 2023.

== Notable alumni ==
- Phil Angelides, 31st California State Treasurer
- Max Barbakow, screenwriter and director (Palm Springs)
- Riley P. Bechtel, Bechtel CEO
- Laurel Braitman, science historian, New York Times bestselling author, and TED Fellow
- Rukmini Maria Callimachi, journalist and poet
- Donald Cooksey, physicist
- Jennifer Crittenden, television writer (The Simpsons, Everybody Loves Raymond, Seinfeld)
- Michael P. Drescher, associate justice of the Vermont Supreme Court
- Michael Raoul Duval, Special Counsel to the President; investment banker; attorney
- Paul B. Fay, Jr., businessman and adviser to President John F. Kennedy
- Sidney D. Gamble, renowned photographer and sociologist of early 20th century China
- Glen David Gold, author of Carter Beats the Devil, Sunnyside, and I Will Be Complete: A Memoir
- James Newton Howard, composer
- Ye Htoon, Burmese lawyer and political dissident
- Howard Hughes, aviator and industrialist. Thacher was the second prep school that he attended. He enrolled when he and his parents moved to California, and he was still at Thacher when his mother died.
- Suriya Evans-Pritchard Jayanti, diplomat and journalist
- Roger Kent, Naval officer and political advisor
- Sherman Kent, intelligence analyst
- D. Andrew Kille, writer, teacher, and scholar of psychological biblical criticism
- Josh Klausner, screenwriter and director (Date Night, Shrek Forever After, Wanderland)
- Michael E. Knight, actor (All My Children)
- Sarah Konrad, Olympian: the first American woman to compete in two different disciplines at the same Winter Olympics (United States at the 2006 Winter Olympics)
- John Lenczowski, founder and president of The Institute of World Politics
- Norman Livermore, environmentalist, lumberman and official under Governor Ronald Reagan
- J. P. Manoux, actor
- John Wescott Myers, World War II test pilot
- Charles Nordhoff, co-author of Mutiny on the Bounty
- Wheeler J. North, marine biologist
- Leland Orser, actor (Taken)
- William Horsley Orrick Jr., United States federal judge
- Clay Pell, lawyer and politician
- Joely Richardson, actress
- Matt Shakman, director
- Jonathan Tucker, actor (Justified)
- Charles L. Tutt, III, engineer and hotelier
- Terdema L. Ussery II, business executive and attorney; former Dallas Mavericks president and CEO
- Thornton Wilder, one of Thacher's most notable alumni, playwright and author. He began writing plays while at Thacher.
- Barry Wood, College Football Hall of Fame inductee
- Noah Wyle, actor

== Notable faculty ==
- Stacy Margolin (born 1959), tennis player
- David Lavender, historian
