= Frank Thacker =

English footballer

Personal information
- Full name: Francis William Thacker
- Date of birth: 11 June 1876
- Place of birth: Chesterfield, England
- Date of death: 1949 (aged 72–73)
- Position: Wing half

Senior career*
Years	Team	Apps	(Gls)
1895–1896	Sheepbridge Red Rose		
1896–1897	Sheepbridge Works		
1897–1898	Sheffield United	2	(0)
1898–1906	Chesterfield Town	228	(25)
1906–1908	Clapton Orient	34	(1)
1908–1909	Rotherham Town		
1909–1910	Chesterfield Town		
1910–1911	Sheepbridge		
1911	Chesterfield Town		
Total		264	(26)
- * Club domestic league appearances and goals

Francis William Thacker (11 June 1876 – 1949) was an English footballer who played in the Football League for Chesterfield Town, Clapton Orient and Sheffield United.
