= Thomas Anthony Thacher =

American classicist and college administrator

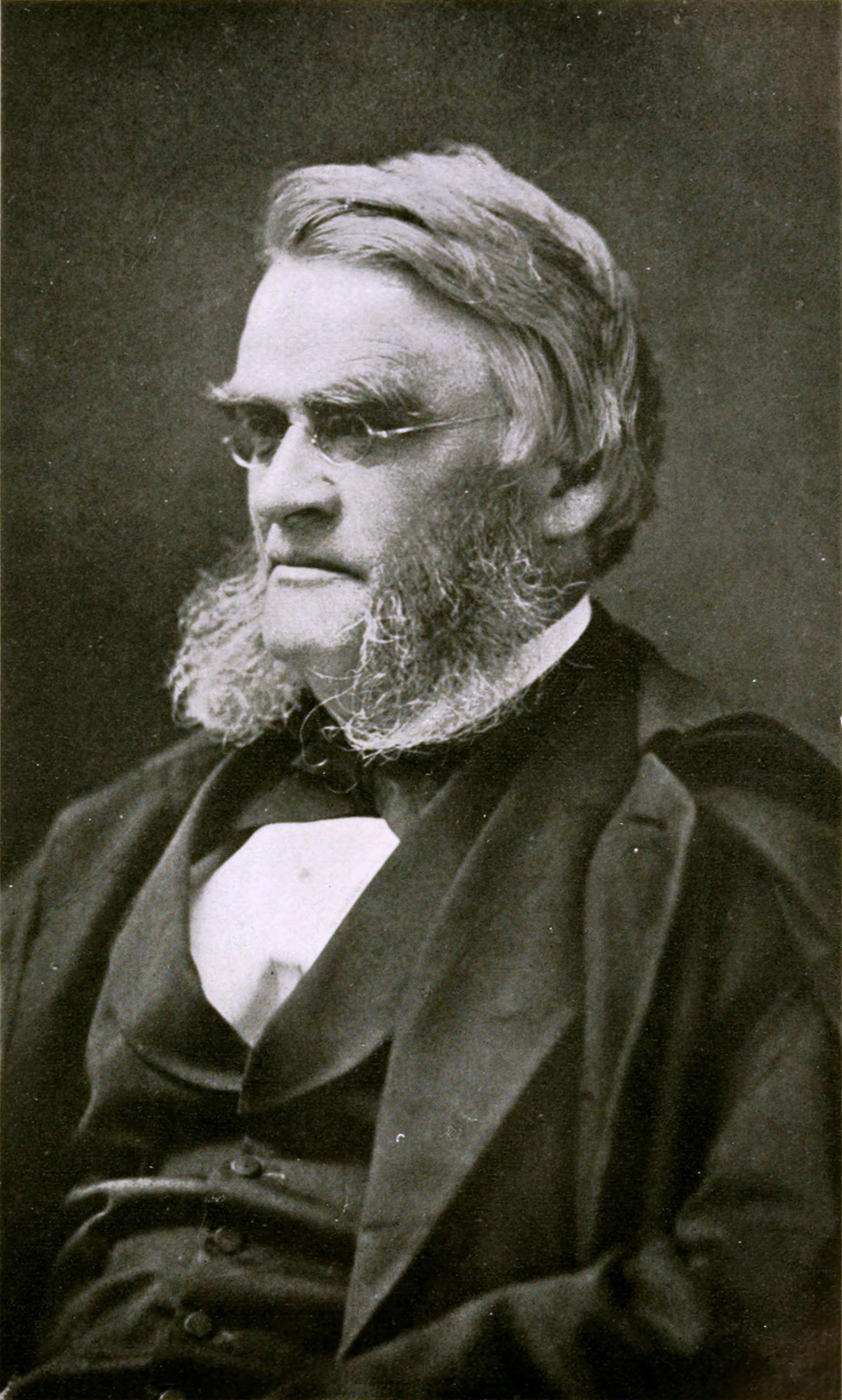
- Born: January 11, 1815; Hartford, Connecticut, US
- Died: April 7, 1886 (aged 71); New Haven, Connecticut, US
- Education: Yale College
- Occupation: Classicist
- Employer: Yale College
- Children: 9, including James, Thomas, Sherman, Elizabeth
- Father: Thomas Thacher
- Relatives: George Thacher (brother); Thomas D. Thacher (grandson); Zoe Kazan (great-great-granddaughter)

Thomas Anthony Thacher (January 11, 1815 – April 7, 1886) was an American classicist and college administrator.

== Early life ==
Thomas A. Thacher was born January 11, 1815, in Hartford, Connecticut, the son of Anne (née Parks) and Peter Thacher. His first American ancestor on his father's side was Thomas Thacher who emigrated from England to Massachusetts in 1635, and later became minister of the Old South Meeting House in Boston; on his mother's side he was descended from the Rev. Thomas Buckingham of Saybrook, one of the founders of the Collegiate School of Connecticut, since known as Yale College. He had his preparatory training at the Hopkins Grammar School, Hartford, and graduated from Yale with the class of 1835; where he was a member of Skull and Bones.

== Career ==
For a short time he held a temporary teaching position in New Canaan, Connecticut, and then went to a school in Georgia, which was later to become Oglethorpe University. In all he spent three years teaching in two academies in Georgia, returning to Yale College on December 1, 1838, to take the position of tutor. He was appointed assistant professor of Latin and Greek in 1842 and one year later the title was restricted to Latin and he was given a year's leave of absence for study in Europe. This year was eventually extended to two years and from 1843 to 1845 he studied in Germany and Italy. While in Berlin he instructed the Crown Prince of Prussia, and his cousin, Prince Frederick Charles. Six years after his return to Yale he was made professor of Latin. He was long a trustee of Hopkins Grammar School in New Haven and was a member of the state board of education 1866-77. He was on the committee for building the Yale Art School, serving with President Noah Porter and Professor Daniel Coit Gilman.

Thacher was identified with Yale College more closely than any of his contemporaries. President Timothy Dwight V said of him, "His influence with the Faculty and the Corporation equaled or even surpassed that of any other College officer." This extraordinary position was due not primarily to his scholarship, although he had the reputation of being a sound and thorough scholar, but to his keen interest and constant activity in the management of college affairs both faculty and undergraduate. Before the day of deans, Thacher did much of the work which a dean would perform today. He was known as one of the best disciplinarians that the college ever had and yet he retained the devotion and affection of undergraduates to an extraordinary degree. As an undergraduate he had been "exuberant in spirit," and one who was a student under him in Yale writes of "Tutor Thacher, the florid and fiery, of perpetual youth and enthusiasm."

He and Professor Theodore Dwight Woolsey were the first advocates at Yale of graduate instruction in non-technical fields and he himself was one of the first classicists to go abroad for the advancement of his scholarship. This scholarship was never very productive. He edited Cicero's De Officiis in 1850, and largely as a result of his work with Karl Zumpt in Berlin he published in 1871 A Latin Grammar for the Use of Schools, a translation of the work of Johan Nikolai Madvig. Aside from these productions, a few slight essays and book reviews in the New Englander make up his professional output. A teacher always, rather than an investigator, he seems even to have had a slightly suspicious attitude toward those who gave too much time to research. Clarence W. Mendell said,

Even in his teaching he was possibly too much of a disciplinarian and was sometimes thought to stick too rigorously to the grammar. To his work as administrator, Thacher brought exceptional qualifications and in this line lay his great achievements. As a teacher he contributed his share to the department's prestige while, with his strong convictions and fearless courage, his energy in raising and administering funds, his interest in people, his wide acquaintance with Yale alumni, and his devout and conscientious character, he played a larger role in the building of modern Yale than that of any one of his contemporaries.

== Family ==
On September 16, 1846, he married Elizabeth Day, the daughter of Yale president Jeremiah Day and Olivia (Jones) Day. She died on May 18, 1858, leaving five sons (James Kingsley Thacher, Thomas Thacher, Edward Stanley Thacher, Alfred Beaumont Thacher, and John Seymour Thacher). On August 1, 1860, he married her cousin Elizabeth Baldwin Sherman, and had three sons and one daughter (Sherman Day Thacher, William Larned Thacher, Elizabeth Baldwin Thacher, and George Thacher). Both wives were granddaughters of founding father Roger Sherman. His brother was Yale president George Thacher.

His son Thomas Thacher was a prominent lawyer. His sons Sherman Day Thacher and William Larned Thacher were the founders of the Thacher School in Ojai, California; and his daughter Elizabeth Sherman Thacher married William Kent. He was also the paternal grandfather of US Solicitor General Thomas D. Thacher (son of Thomas Thacher) and Molly Kazan (daughter of Alfred Beaumont Thacher, wife of Elia Kazan), and the great-great-grandfather of actresses Zoe Kazan and Maya Kazan (their father in Nicholas Kazan).

Thacher died April 7, 1886, in New Haven, Connecticut.

== See also ==
- List of Skull and Bones Members

== Sources ==
- "Thomas Anthony Thacher." Dictionary of American Biography Base Set. American Council of Learned Societies, 1928-1936. Reproduced in Biography Resource Center. Farmington Hills, Mich.: Thomson Gale. 2005. http://galenet.galegroup.com/servlet/BioRC
