= Thatcher, Nebraska =

Unincorporated community in Nebraska, U.S.

Coordinates: 42°48′22″N 100°27′58″W

Thatcher (also Thacher) is an unincorporated community. It is located in Cherry County, Nebraska, United States.

Zip code: 69201

Climate: Winter's cold and snowy, summer's hot, and is windy often.

== History ==
Thatcher had a post office from 1884 until 1889. The community was named for James M. Thatcher of Fort Niobrara.
