= Sherman Day Thacher =

American headmaster

- Born: November 6, 1861; New Haven, Connecticut; United States
- Died: August 5, 1931 (aged 69); Santa Barbara, California; United States
- Education: Yale University; Hopkins Grammar School
- Occupation: Educator
- Employer(s): The Thacher School; Ojai, California
- Known for: Founder and first headmaster of The Thacher School
- Spouse: Eliza (Blake) Thacher
- Children: Elizabeth, George Blake, Anson Stiles, Helen Sherman, Harriet Janet, and Sherman Day, Jr.
- Parent(s): Thomas Anthony Thacher; Elizabeth Baldwin (Sherman) Thacher
- Relatives: Roger Sherman, great-grandfather Rep. William Kent, brother-in-law
- Awards: Townsend Prize; John Addison Porter Prize
- Honors: Master of Arts (honorary) from Yale University

Sherman Day Thacher (November 6, 1861 - August 5, 1931) was the founder and headmaster of The Thacher School at Ojai, California.

== Early life, education and degrees ==
Thacher was the son of Elizabeth Baldwin (Sherman) Thacher, granddaughter of Roger Sherman, and Thomas Anthony Thacher. The family had a history at Yale University. His mother's father, Roger Sherman, Jr., had obtained his bachelor's degree from Yale in 1787 and his father obtained his 1835. His father was also both an administrator and a professor of Latin at Yale. He had a sister, Elizabeth Thacher Kent, who married U.S. Congressman William Kent and a brother, William L. Thacher, who would join him in the Thacher School.

Thacher attended Hopkins Grammar School in his youth before himself attending Yale, where he served on the eleventh editorial board of The Yale Record. He distinguished himself in English, taking second prize in English composition during his second year. From 1883 to 1884, he worked as a salesman for W. & J. Sloane in New York City, before, in 1886, he earned a Bachelor of Laws with honors from Yale, taking the Townsend Prize and the John Addison Porter Prize. In 1923, Yale would bestow upon him an honorary Master of Arts.

During his college career, he was a member of Delta Kappa Epsilon, Psi Upsilon, and Skull and Bones. In 1926, Occidental College of Los Angeles made him an honorary charter member of the Delta chapter of Phi Beta Kappa.

== Career ==
After graduation, Thacher moved to California and took up 160 acres (0.65 km^{2}) of government land to plant an orange grove. In 1889, he founded the Thacher School at Ojai, California, serving as its headmaster. In 1895, his brother William came to work with the school. He remained as headmaster until his retirement in June, 1931.

During his career, he held a number of other positions, honorary and actual. From 1898 to 1912, he was trustee of the San Antonio District School. From 1908 to 1922, he was president of the board of trustees of Nordhoff High School in California. He stood as president of the Headmasters Association of the Pacific Coast Private Schools for Boys from 1930 to 1931. He was an honorary member of the Headmasters Association of Eastern Private Schools for Boys.

From 1918 to 1919, he was the vice president of the Yale Club of Southern California and represented it on the Alumni Board at Yale after 1920. In 1924, he was a member of the Yale Committee for Participation in the Restoration of the Library of the University of Louvain

Active in civics as well, he chaired the executive committee of the Ojai Valley Men's League from 1910 to 1920, and in 1912 chaired a standing committee of the Ojai Board of Trade. In 1918, he served the local Exemption Board for Ventura County. He was a Four-Minute Man and the director of the Ojai Civic Association. He stood on the advisory committee of the California Junior Republic from 1920 to 1931.

He was an honorary trustee of the National Society of Mental Hygiene. He was a member of the American Association for the Advancement of Science; the American Academy of Arts and Sciences; and the American Academy of Political and Social Science.

== Personal life ==
On June 24, 1896, Thacher wed Eliza Seely Blake in New Haven. Although Blake herself was a graduate of the University of California (1895), her family were Yale alumni as well. Her father, Charles Thompson Blake, had graduated with a BA in 1847, and her grandfather Eli Whitney Blake had graduated with a BA in 1816.

The couple shared nine children. In addition to three sons who died in infancy, they had Elizabeth, George Blake, Anson Stiles, Helen Sherman, Harriet Janet, and Sherman Day, Jr. All three of their sons, George Blake. Anson Stiles, and Sherman Day Jr., carried on the family Yale tradition, in 1925, 1927 and 1936 respectively. (George Blake would go on to attend the Massachusetts Institute of Technology in 1927.) Two of their daughters, Helen Sherman and Harriet Janet, attended Smith College (1930, 1934). Their eldest child, Elizabeth, graduated from the University of California in 1920.

Thacher was 69 years old when he died, on August 5, 1931, of operative shock. He left behind his wife, three sons, and three daughters. A Presbyterian, Thacher attended the Ojai Valley Community Church from 1887 until his death.

His great-great-grandson, Mateo Thacher, graduated in June 2020, and served as the Thacher School Chair (or head of the student body).
