= Adaline Kent =

American sculptor (1900–1957)

- Born: Adaline Dutton Kent; August 7, 1900; Kentfield, California, United States
- Died: March 24, 1957 (aged 56); Marin County, California, United States
- Other name: Adaline Kent Howard
- Education: Vassar College, San Francisco Art Institute; Grande Chaumiere
- Occupation: Sculptor
- Known for: Sculpture
- Style: Post-war California Modernism
- Spouse: Robert Boardman Howard (m. 1930–1957; death)
- Children: 2
- Parent(s): Elizabeth Thacher Kent and William Kent

Adaline Dutton Kent (August 7, 1900 – March 24, 1957) also known as Adaline Kent Howard, was an American sculptor from California. She created abstract sculptures with forms inspired by the natural landscape.

== Early life and education ==
Kent was born on August 7, 1900, in Kentfield, California, one of seven children of women's rights activist Elizabeth Thacher Kent and U.S. congressman William Kent. Her grandfather, Albert Emmett Kent, had purchased an 800-acre farm in 1871, which later became the town of Kentfield.

She began her education at Vassar College before returning to the Bay Area to study at the California School of Fine Arts. She studied in Paris with Antoine Bourdelle at the Grande Chaumiere. She married Robert Boardman Howard on August 5, 1930, after they worked together on the Pacific Stock Exchange building, a Miller and Pflueger architecture firm project. They had two daughters, Ellen (May 1931 – Oct 1987) and Galen (born April 1933).

== Work ==
The first fifteen years of her career, her art focused on the human body. She loved the fact that sculpting the human body offered anyone to have their own personal interpretation to the craft. According to Kent, there is no awkwardness to the human body and its representation is not subjective to anyone other than the creator. Kent also felt comfortable with taking ideas from the human form because our bodies are familiar and easy to shape into various artistic position. This foundation in the form of the human body led her to discover her true passion of creating works of art that dealt with the flow of nature.

Kent loved to hike and explore various trails in the Sierra Mountains. Kent found a lot of influence from the rock formations in the Sierra Nevada Mountains. In her travels Kent was able to find the meditation that influenced her use the ideas of others in her art. She ventured outside of the human form and into more three-dimensional curved form that left her art to interpretation. Kent also found influence in mountain formations, she explored the way gravity works with a few sketches. Her most notable sketch “Song” was made in 1945 and centered on the Sierra Nevada Mountains and the music of nature. Kent also made sculptures from various material such as seashells, driftwood, and crystals. Adaline Kent felt that “works of nature are one with works of art”.

Kent also took influence from primitive resources that originated in other cultures. She admired certain artworks from witchcraft and spiritual customs. According to Kent they represented a great deal of mystery and left interpretation up to the imagination. She was able to identify how shapes can carry certain meanings. The sharper edges an object might have, the more emotion it might trigger. The more a sculpture had rounder, smoother edges the more relaxed an individual might feel. Her sculptures remain an important part of surrealist and modern art because of her eye of interpreting the world and its forms. To Kent sculpting was an adventure into the unknown with meaning being attached to personal vision.

=== Golden Gate International Exposition ===
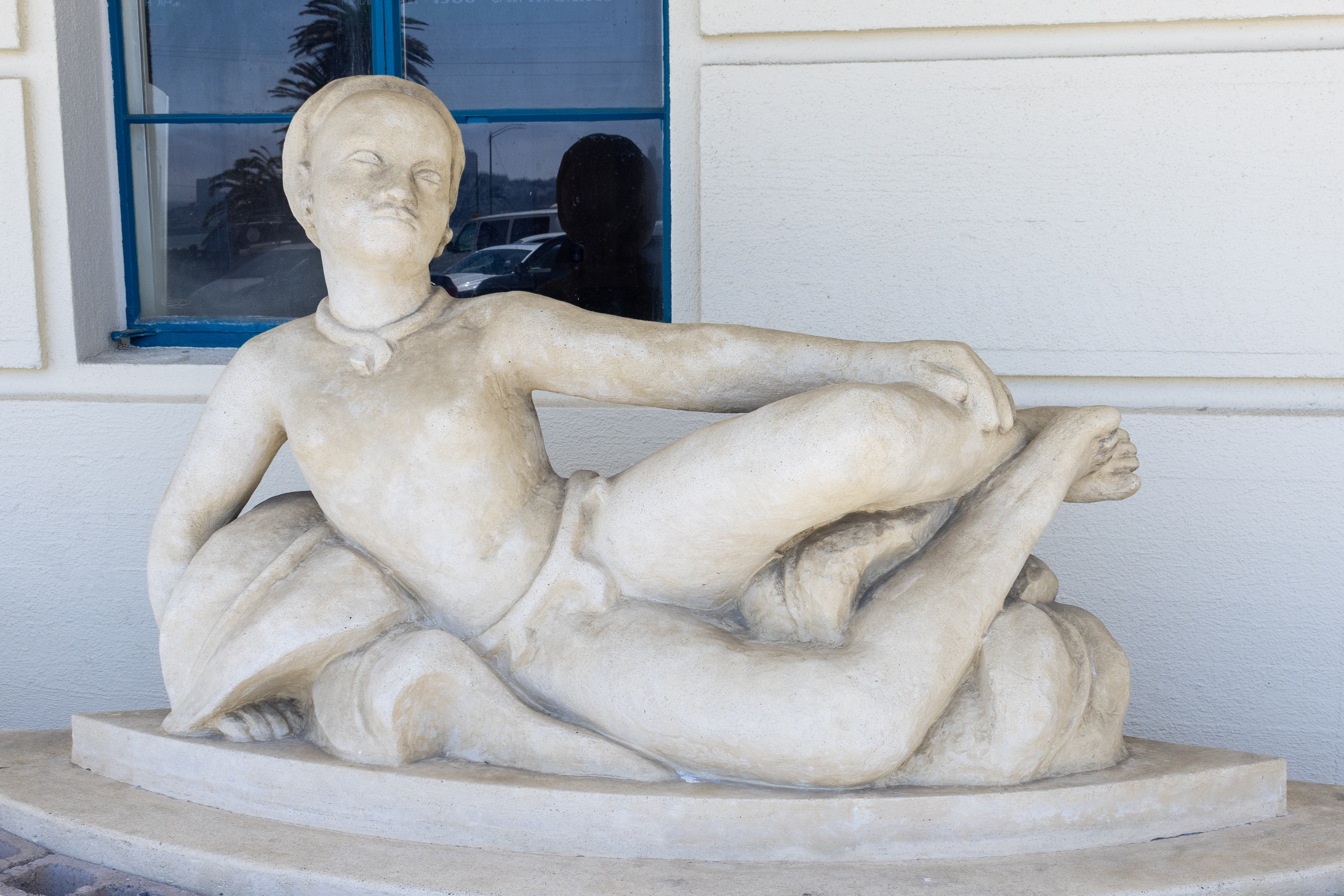
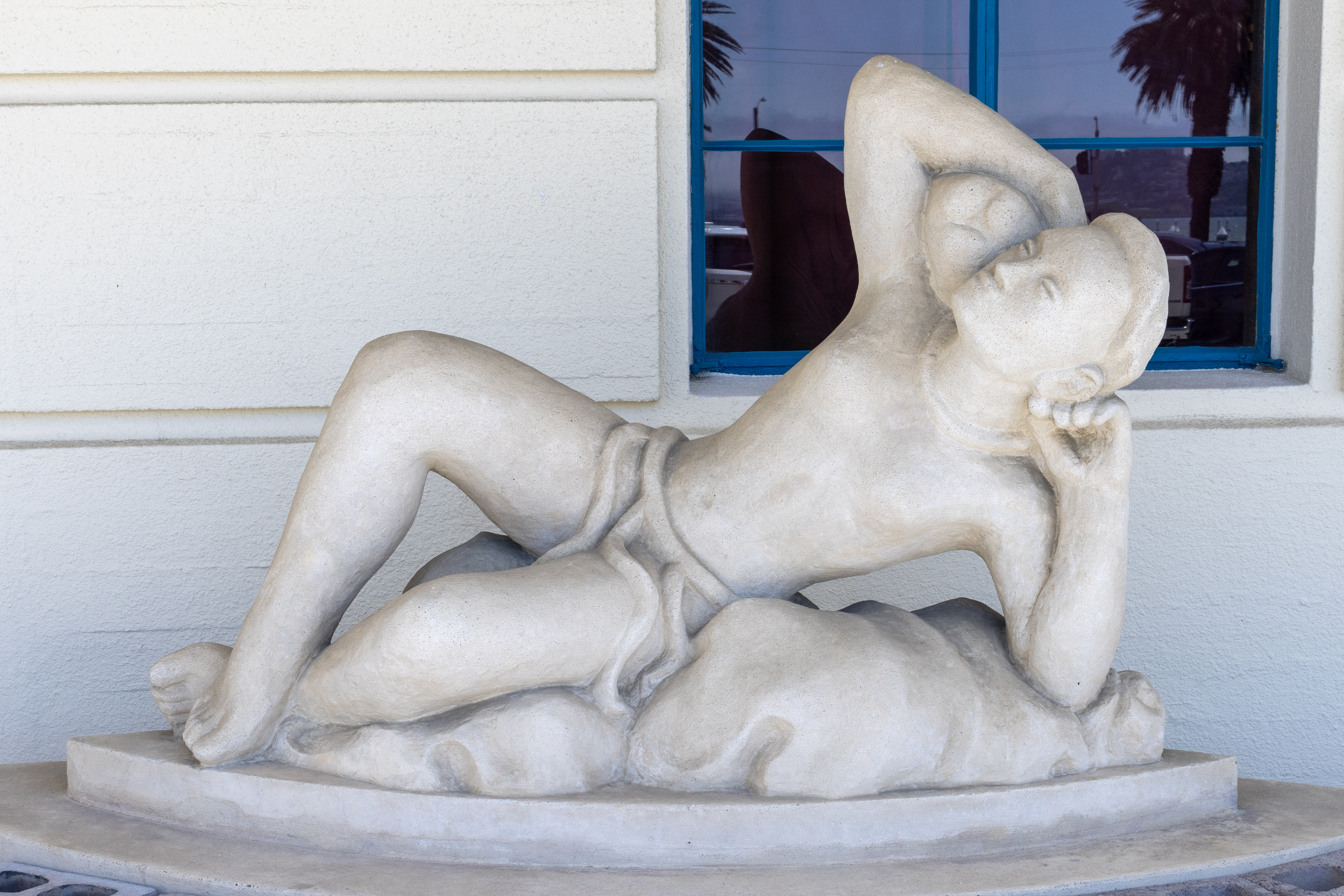
Islands of the Pacific sculptures for the Golden Gate International Exposition

During the Golden Gate International Exposition on Treasure Island in San Francisco Bay (1939–1940), Kent produced three sculptures that were part of a group of twenty located around the Fountain of Western Waters. The sculptures and fountain were part of the "Court of Pacifica," a landscaped court designed by architect Timothy Pflueger, representing the fair's theme of "Pacific Unity." Pacifica, designed by Kent's teacher, sculptor Ralph Stackpole, was an 80 foot "goddess of Pacific Unity" at the head of the court. The cast stone statues were designed in groups to represent four different geographical areas of the Pacific: North America, South America, Asia and the Pacific Islands. Kent's group represented three young people from the South Pacific. In 1941 the US Navy took control of Treasure Island and over time, dismantled many buildings, courtyards and gardens of the exposition. During the dismantling of the Fountain of Western Waters in 1942, four of the sculptures on the fountain were destroyed or have otherwise disappeared, including one by Kent. In approximately 1991 the Navy moved ten of the surviving statues into storage and had six of them repaired, preserved and placed on display at the front of Building One, a public building, on Treasure Island. As of March 2022, two of Kent's sculptures remain on display in front of Building One.

== Death and legacy ==
On March 24, 1957, Kent died in an accident while driving on the Pacific Coast Highway in Marin County.

Adaline Kent was an alumna and a former board member (1947–1957) of the San Francisco Art Institute, and left it $10,000 to establish an annual award for promising artists from California. The prize was awarded from 1957 to 2005. Winners included Ron Nagle (1978), Wally Hedrick (1985), David Ireland (1987), Mildred Howard (1991), Clare Rojas (2004), and the last recipient, Scott Williams (2005).

== Exhibitions ==
=== Solo exhibitions ===
- 1934 – San Francisco Art Center, San Francisco, California;
- 1941 – Courvoisier Gallery, San Francisco, California;
- 1937, 1948, 1958 – San Francisco Museum of Art (now called San Francisco Museum of Modern Art or SFMoMA), San Francisco, California;
- 1953 – Santa Barbara Museum of Art, Santa Barbara, California;
- 1955 – California Palace of the Legion of Honor, San Francisco, California.

=== Group exhibitions ===
- 1951 – Abstract Painting and Sculpture in America, Museum of Modern Art (MoMA), New York City, New York
- 1995 – Pacific Dreams: Currents of Surrealism and Fantasy in California Art, 1934–1957, group exhibition, Oakland Museum of California, Oakland, California; including artists Kent, Clay Spohn, Wolfgang Paalen, Salvador Dalí, Man Ray, Ruth Bernhard, John Gutmann, Edward Weston, Knud Merrild
- 2010 – 75 Years of Looking Forward, San Francisco Museum of Modern Art (SFMoMA), San Francisco, California.
