= Thomas D. Thacher =

American judge (1881–1950)

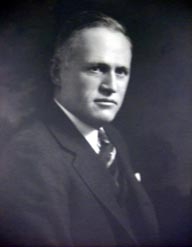

21st Solicitor General of the United States
- In office March 22, 1930 – May 4, 1933
- President: Herbert Hoover; Franklin D. Roosevelt
- Preceded by: Charles Evans Hughes Jr.
- Succeeded by: James Crawford Biggs

Judge of the United States District Court for the Southern District of New York
- In office January 21, 1925 – April 10, 1930
- Appointed by: Calvin Coolidge
- Preceded by: Learned Hand
- Succeeded by: Robert P. Patterson

Personal details
- Born: Thomas Day Thacher; September 10, 1881 Tenafly, New Jersey, U.S.
- Died: November 12, 1950 (aged 69) New York City, U.S.
- Resting place: Brookside Cemetery; Englewood, New Jersey
- Party: Republican
- Education: Yale University (BA)

Thomas Day Thacher (September 10, 1881 – November 12, 1950) was a United States district judge of the United States District Court for the Southern District of New York, the 21st Solicitor General of the United States and a Judge of the New York Court of Appeals.

== Education and career ==
Born on September 10, 1881, in Tenafly, New Jersey, Thacher was the son of Thomas Thacher, a prominent New York City, New York attorney. He attended the Taft School in Watertown, Connecticut and Phillips Academy in Andover, Massachusetts. He received a Bachelor of Arts degree in 1904 from Yale University where he was a member of Skull and Bones, and after attending Yale Law School, read law in 1906. He entered private practice in New York City from 1906 to 1907, with his father's law firm of Simpson, Thacher & Bartlett. Thacher remained with the firm and was made a partner in 1914. He was an Assistant United States Attorney for the Southern District of New York from 1907 to 1910. While in this position, Thacher was recognized for his work in prosecuting customs fraud. He returned to private practice in New York City from 1910 to 1917. In 1911 he helped found the New York Young Republican Club. He was a Major for the American Red Cross Commission to Russia from 1917 to 1918. He again returned to private practice in New York City from 1918 to 1925.

== Federal judicial service ==
Thacher was nominated by President Calvin Coolidge on January 9, 1925, to a seat on the United States District Court for the Southern District of New York vacated by Judge Learned Hand. He was confirmed by the United States Senate on January 19, 1925, and received his commission on January 21, 1925. His service terminated on April 10, 1930, due to his resignation.

=== Accomplishments while judge ===
Thacher was instrumental in investigating the operation of the bankruptcy laws in New York City. His reports to President Herbert Hoover were the basis for amendments to the law that extended the control of the courts over bankruptcy proceedings and speeded up the settlement process, thereby reducing any opportunities for abuses.

== Later career ==
Thacher served as the 21st Solicitor General of the United States from March 1930 to May 1933. He returned to private practice in New York City from 1933 to 1943. He helped create the movement that made possible the election of Fiorello H. La Guardia as Mayor of New York City. La Guardia appointed Thacher to serve as the leader on the commission to write a new city charter and to the city's Corporation Counsel in 1943. He was a Judge of the New York Court of Appeals from 1943 to 1948, appointed to that post by Governor of New York Thomas E. Dewey.

== Other service and family ==
Thacher served as a fellow of the Yale Corporation from 1931 to 1949, President of the Association of the Bar of the City of New York from 1933 to 1935, and was a member of numerous social clubs. He first married Eunice Booth Burall, and had three children. After Eunice's death in 1943, Thacher married Eleanor M. Lloyd on July 20, 1945.

== Death ==
Thacher died of a coronary thrombosis on November 12, 1950, at his home in New York City. He was interred in Brookside Cemetery in Englewood, New Jersey.

== Sources ==
- "Solicitor General: Thomas D. Thacher". www.justice.gov. 23 October 2014.
- Fraternity, Psi Upsilon (1917). The twelfth general catalogue of the Psi Upsilon Fraternity. p. 183.

Legal offices
Preceded by Learned Hand	Judge of the United States District Court for the Southern District of New York; 1925–1930	Succeeded by Robert P. Patterson
Preceded by Charles Evans Hughes Jr.	21st Solicitor General of the United States; 1930–1933	Succeeded by James Crawford Biggs
