= Thomas Thacher (minister) =

American physician

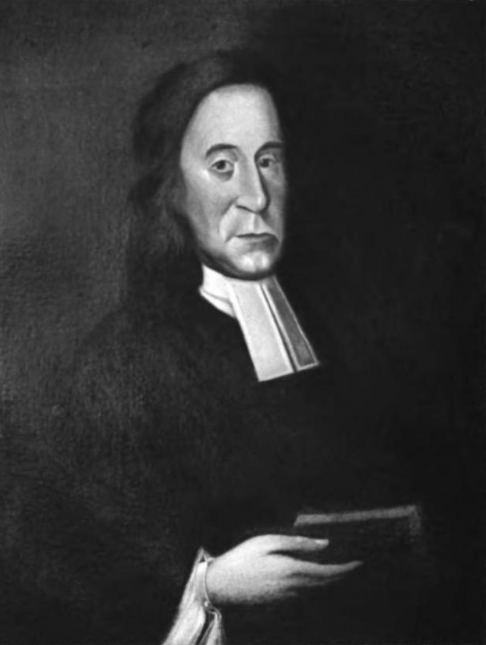
- Portrait in the collection of Revolutionary Spaces
- Born: 1 May 1620; Milton Clevedon, England
- Died: 15 October 1678 (aged 58); Boston, Massachusetts
- Occupation: Clergyman
- Spouses: Elizabeth Partridge Kemp (m. 1643; died 1664): Margaret Webb Sheaffe
- Children: 4

Thomas Thacher (1 May 1620 – 15 October 1678) was an English-American clergyman.

== Biography ==
Coat of Arms of Thomas Thatcher

Thomas Thacher was born in Milton Clevedon on 1 May 1620. He we was educated by his father, a minister at Salisbury, who prepared him for entrance to one of the English universities, but the son declined to subscribe to the religious tests that were then a condition of matriculation, and resolved on settling in New England. He reached Boston on 4 June 1635, and soon afterward entered the family of Reverend Charles Chauncy at Scituate, under whose guidance he studied mental philosophy and theology, and attained a remarkable knowledge of the Eastern languages. He was especially noted for the great beauty of his transcriptions of Syriac and other Eastern characters, and also acquired a knowledge of medicine, practicing occasionally with success.

He married Elizabeth Partridge Kemp on 11 May 1643 and they had four children. She died on 2 June 1664, and he remarried to Margaret Webb Sheaffe.

He was ordained at Weymouth on 2 January 1644, and shortly afterward took charge of the congregation of that village. Here he remained till 1664, when he removed to Boston, possibly because the relatives of his second wife resided there, although he is said to have been dismissed by his congregation in Weymouth a little before that time. He practiced as a physician in Boston for the next two years, but preached occasionally. On 16 February 1669, he was installed pastor of the Old South Meeting House. He is mentioned in terms of high praise by Cotton Mather in the Magnalia, who quotes an elegy, written partly in Latin and partly in Greek by Eleazar, a Native American student at Harvard College, in which the virtues of Thacher are celebrated. He wrote A Brief Rule to Guide the Common People of New England how to order Themselves and Theirs in the Small Pocks or Measels, which is supposed to have been the first work on medicine that was published in Massachusetts (Boston, 1677; 2d ed., 1702), and A Fast of God's Chusing; Fast Sermon (1674).

Thomas Thacher died in Boston on 15 October 1678.
