= Patti Moreno =

American film producer

- Born: New York City, New York, U.S.
- Education: Boston University
- Occupations: Film producer, TV host
- Known for: Garden Girl in Garden Girl TV

Patti Moreno, born in New York City, is an independent film producer and television personality best known for her work as Garden Girl on the web video series Garden Girl TV. Living and working in Boston, Moreno published the website and e-newsletter Urban Sustainable Living from 2007-2011. She is also the co-host of Growing a Greener World, author for Fine Gardening, and gardening expert for HGTV.

== Education ==
Moreno graduated from Boston University with a degree in film and video production.

== Career ==
In 1997, she produced her first film, Squeeze, which was written and directed by her husband, Robert Patton-Spruill. Moreno went on to produce Spruill's next two films, Turntable (2005) and Public Enemy: Welcome to the Terrordome (2008), a documentary on the rap group Public Enemy, and co-produced Do It Again (2010), a documentary about a Boston Globe reporter's quest to reunite the classic rock band The Kinks.

=== Garden Girl ===
After the birth of her daughter in 1996, Moreno was 70 pounds overweight and used gardening as a way to get back in shape. Having just moved into a new home in Roxbury, Massachusetts, Moreno developed gardening methods for an urban environment instead of maintaining a lawn, incorporating the ideas of container gardening, vertical gardening, and Square foot gardening to get the most results from the least space. Moreno refined her technique and called it "urban sustainable living". This concept covers all aspects of urban farming, from planting and maintaining crops to raising small livestock.

She combined her film background with her gardening skills to lay the groundwork for her website, Garden Girl TV, on which she posted short, how-to videos on urban gardening methods. Her videos touch not only on gardening, but also on cooking, water gardens, aquaculture, crafts and livestock.

In 2007, Moreno filmed the first season of Garden Girl TV. She has since made over 200 videos, and released two feature-length gardening DVDs – Square Foot Gardening (2010) and Urban Sustainable Living (2008). Patti is currently shooting the first season of a new TV series Gardening By Cuisine (2012), producing videos for HGTV.com and HGTVpro.com, and she is writing a book on urban sustainable living to accompany the series.

In 2010, Moreno appeared in a 16 part Gardening series for HGTV.com and released her book "Gardening By Cuisine" based on her web series Garden Girl TV in 2013.

With the success of Garden Girl TV, Moreno started 617Digital, a boutique production company making branded entertainment videos for Scripps Networks.
