= Edge of America =

- Genre: Documentary
- Starring: Geoff Edgers
- Country of origin: United States
- No. of seasons: 1
- No. of episodes: 10

Production
- Executive producers: Patrick McManamee, Brian Flanagan, Matthew Ostrom, Laura Palumbo Johnson
- Running time: 20 to 22 minutes (excluding commercials)
- Production company: Magilla Entertainment

Original release
- Network: Travel Channel
- Release: January 22 – March 14, 2013

Edge of America is an American culture and travel show on the Travel Channel, hosted by and starring Geoff Edgers. The show features Edgers, an arts and entertainment reporter for The Boston Globe, on a journey through America in search of strange and unique forms of entertainment and culture. Edgers samples bizarre foods and joins in activities such as bicycle jousting, rattlesnake hunting, and Pig-N-Ford Races. The show ended after a run of ten episodes on March 14, 2013.

== Premise ==
Edge of America follows Edgers as he discovers and participates in traditions such as bicycle jousting and Pig-N-Ford Races in Oregon, lobster boat racing in Maine, and a calf testicle festival in Oklahoma. In an interview with the Los Angeles Times, Edgers described the content of the show: "It's history, entertainment and action ... To me, this is the greatest kind of Americana, where people take a necessity—like castrating cows and killing rattlesnakes—and make a big party out of it." Edgers also said that the show would feature "strange American things in scenic American places" in an interview with The Boston Globe.

== Production and reception ==
The Travel Channel announced that it had picked up Edge of America in September 2012, and slated a run of six episodes, to be broadcast in early 2013. The premiere was eventually set for January 22, 2013, with two episodes—"Oklahoma" and "Oregon"—to be broadcast back-to-back at 9:00 pm ET. Promoting the new series, Travel Channel general manager Andy Singer said of Edgers' hosting: "As a journalist, Geoff Edgers is a curious storyteller. He's also crazy and up for anything, which makes him the ideal host to help introduce our viewers to these surprising pursuits".

Edge of America initially received good reviews and strong ratings upon release. The New York Times' Neil Genzlinger wrote a mostly positive review, saying that "The intent is to make you marvel at just how bizarre Americans' recreational preferences can be .... Too often, Mr. Edgers settles for .... Phrases like 'What am I doing?' and 'What have I gotten myself into?' .... But once in a while he lets his deadpan side run loose, to good effect." Scott Christian wrote in the preface to an interview with Edgers in GQ that the show was "Charles Kuralt meets Jackass". After a successful premiere the show's ratings slipped, leading Travel Channel to shift Edge of America's time slot out of primetime to 11:00 pm. The show was then moved to 2:00 pm on Saturdays, and finally to 11 am on Thursdays.

After a run of ten episodes, Edge of America was cancelled, although reruns continue to be shown on the Travel Channel. Edgers chronicled the brief success and eventual demise of the show in an article for Esquire entitled "The Rise and Fall of a Reality TV Star. In Nine Days". "The whiplash wore off and I realized I had little to regret" wrote Edgers. "Yeah, I would have loved a few more weeks at 9 p.m. so we could have at least tried to find our audience. But how could I complain? A television network gave me a shot. They invested time, money and creative energy into Edge of America. I'm proud of the show we made."

== Episodes ==
No.	Title	Original release date
1	"The Edge of Oklahoma"	January 22, 2013
2	"The Edge of Oregon"	January 22, 2013
3	"The Edge of Pennsylvania"	January 29, 2013
4	"The Edge of Maine"	February 5, 2013
5	"The Edge of Florida"	February 9, 2013
6	"The Edge of Arkansas"	February 16, 2013
7	"The Edge of Nevada"	March 8, 2013
8	"The Edge of Louisiana"	March 8, 2013
9	"The Edge of Texas"	March 14, 2013
10	"The Edge of New York"	March 14, 2013
