= Geoff Edgers =

American journalist

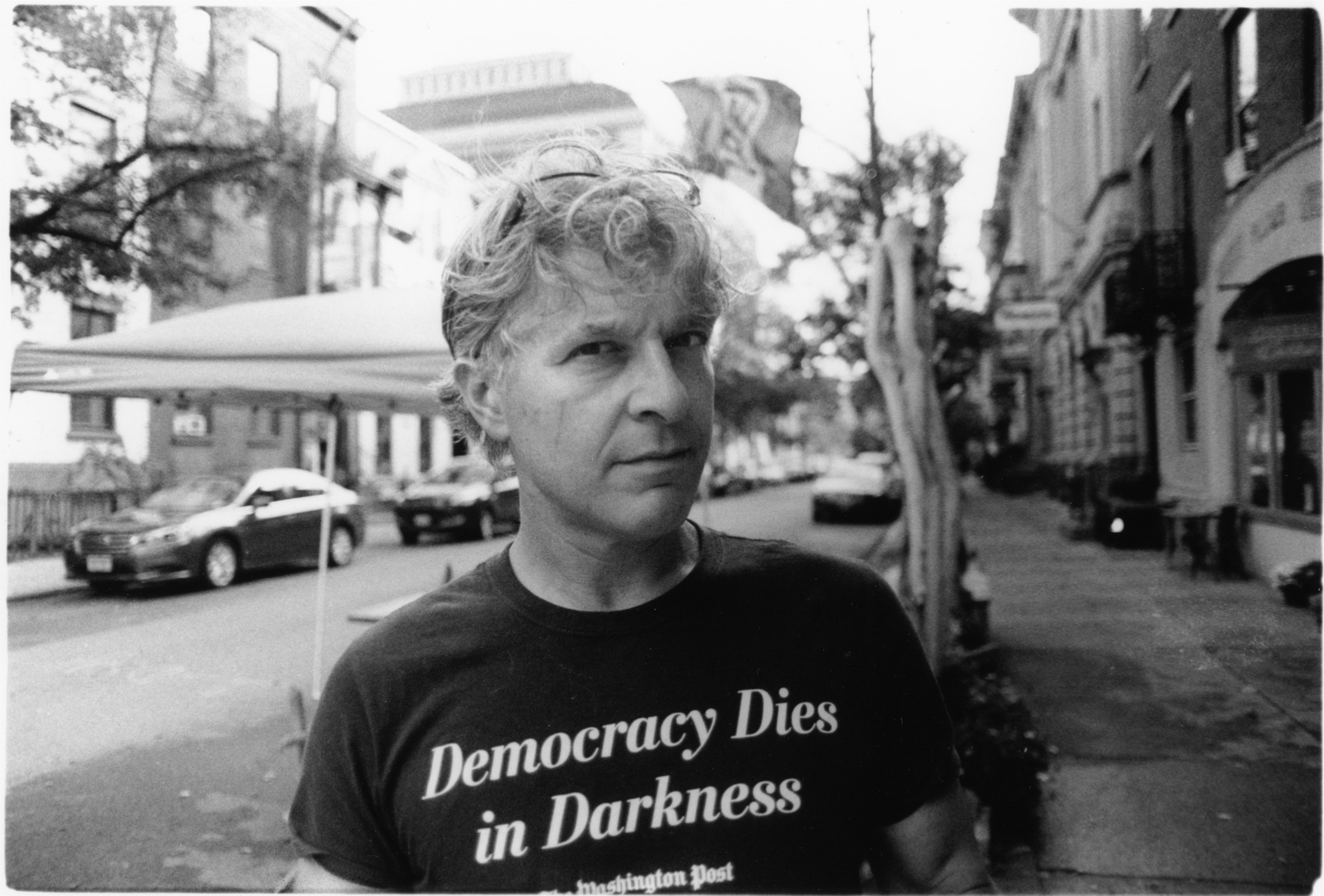
- Edgers in 2018 (photograph by Lila Hempel-Edgers)
- Born: 1970 (age 55–56); Boston, Massachusetts, U.S.
- Occupations: Journalist, author, filmmaker
- Spouse: Carlene Hempel
- Children: Lila and Calvin Hempel-Edgers
- Writing career
- Subjects: Arts, music, the Kinks

Geoff Edgers (born 1970) is an American journalist, author, filmmaker, television host, and podcast host. He is currently the national arts reporter for The Washington Post and was previously a staff arts reporter for The Boston Globe. Edgers currently hosts the Edge of Fame podcast, a collaboration between The Washington Post and WBUR-FM, Boston's NPR National. In addition, Edgers produced and starred in the 2010 music documentary Do It Again. His articles have appeared in magazines such as GQ and Wired, and he has worked as a reporter for several newspapers, including the Boston Phoenix, Raleigh News and Observer, The Boston Globe, and The Washington Post. Edgers has also published children's books on Elvis, the Beatles, and Stan Lee, and co-wrote a book on Julia Child with his wife, Carlene Hempel. In 2013, he hosted a Travel Channel reality TV series called Edge of America, and in June 2013 he was awarded a New England Emmy for work on a video for The Boston Globe. He also hosted the military history series Secrets of the Arsenal on the American Heroes Channel. Edgers joined The Washington Post in September 2014 as the paper's national arts reporter.

== Career ==
Edgers attended Brookline High School in Brookline, Massachusetts and graduated from Tufts University in 1992 with a degree in English. Following his graduation he was employed as a reporter by several newspapers, including the Sudbury Town Crier, Waltham News-Tribune, Middlesex News, Boston Phoenix, and Raleigh News and Observer. He worked as an arts reporter from 2002 to August 2014 for The Boston Globe. His work involved covering the Museum of Fine Arts, Institute of Contemporary Art, Boston Symphony Orchestra, and other arts-related organizations in the Boston area.

Edgers has also freelanced for several magazines including GQ, Spin, Wired, and Salon. Examples of this work include an article on Monkee Michael Nesmith's New Mexico symposiums (for Wired) and a series of pieces for Salon, including one on Brian Wilson's 2000 Pet Sounds tour. Edgers has written three children's books: The Midnight Hour: Bright Ideas for After Dark (Penguin, 1997) and four installments in the Grosset and Dunlap "Who Was...?" series, Who Were The Beatles? (2006), Who Was Elvis Presley? (2007), Who Is Stan Lee? (2014), and Who Was Julia Child? (2015), the last installment collaborating with his wife, Carlene Hempel.

Geoff Edgers teamed up with director Robert Patton-Spruill in early 2008 to begin work on a film about his love of British Invasion band the Kinks, headed by the two feuding brothers Ray and Dave Davies. The documentary, entitled Do It Again follows Edgers throughout America and Britain on a quest to reunite the original members. Edgers meets with various personalities and Kinks fans to discuss the band, such as Sting, Paul Weller, Peter Buck, Zooey Deschanel, Clive Davis, Warren Zanes, Robyn Hitchcock, and Dave Davies himself. Do It Again premiered at the Rotterdam International Film Festival in January 2010, and was met with positive reviews. It traveled the film festival circuit throughout the rest of 2010 (making stops at locations such as the Independent Film Festival of Boston and London International Documentary Festival) and was broadcast on multiple PBS stations throughout late 2011 and early 2012.

In 2013 the Travel Channel aired Edge of America, a TV series starring Edgers. The program, produced by Magilla Productions, involved Edgers on a search for quintessentially American forms of entertainment and fun ("strange American things in scenic American places" according to The Boston Globe), as well as "a quest to see what constitutes entertainment." The Travel Channel showed strong initial confidence in the series. But it failed to attract desirable demographics, and was not renewed.

Edgers was awarded a New England Emmy in June 2013 for work on a video for The Boston Globe. He shared the award with producer Darren Durlach. The short, entitled "Behind the Curtain: Act One of Barbara Quintiliani's Story", is a ten-minute documentary about the success and struggles of acclaimed Massachusetts-based opera singer Barbara Quintiliani. In April 2014, he released another documentary, entitled 5 Runners. The 30 minute film, based on Edgers' April 2013 Boston Globe article "Chance Leaves Five Runners Forever Linked", documents the lives of five runners leading up to, during, and directly after the Boston Marathon bombing. The five competitors, at the time all in the close vicinity of the explosion and directly affected by the trauma, share an ambition to run the race once more in order to achieve closure. Edgers wrote and narrated the film and shared directing duties with Darren Durlach. 5 Runners premiered at the John F. Kennedy Presidential Library on April 10, followed by a broadcast on April 14 at 9:30 p.m. on the New England Sports Network.

In August 2014 it was announced that Edgers would leave the Globe to join The Washington Post staff. He began his new position as national arts reporter in September 2014. Since starting at the Post, Edgers had written in-depth profiles of Eddie Murphy, David Letterman, Norm Macdonald, Darrell Hammond, Tom Hanks, and Ava DuVernay, as well as lengthy pieces on the history of Run-DMC’s "Walk This Way" and a story documenting the mysterious life of a man who stole a Stradivarius violin and virtually disappeared with the instrument. A press release from the Post stated that "[Edgers] will have a broad reach to write about arts, entertainment and cultural issues across the nation" and noted that he will remain based in Boston while still reporting to a senior editor in Washington and "appearing in the newsroom frequently." Following on the heels of this appointment, in November 2014 a new television show hosted by Edgers was announced, entitled Secrets of the Arsenal. The series features Edgers exploring the stories and provenance behind military artifacts such as a German pistol from World War II or weapons from the Mexican–American War. After premiering on December 16 at 10:00 PM Eastern, The New York Times' Neil Genzlinger described Edgers' "genuine enthusiasm" for the memorabilia he investigates, stating that in the same "gung-ho" spirit of his work with Edge of America, "he applies that ... passion to visiting museums and private collectors in search of artifacts with stories behind them."

In January 2018, Edgers debuted a new podcast series, Edge of Fame, drawing on his experience as a journalist, documentary film maker, writer, and National Arts Reporter for the Post. In the series, Edgers explores the lives of various celebrities and performers on the dark and humorous sides of show business. Each podcast episode focuses on Edgers shadowing a specific performer for a long period of time. Eschewing a typical one-on-one interview style, Edgers assembles a combination of interviews, testimonials, and anecdotes from various voices he encounters along the way. It was released as a collaborative effort between radio station WBUR and The Washington Post.

Edgers' book Walk this Way: Run-DMC, Aerosmith, and the Song that Changed American Music Forever was published in February 2019, detailing the famous collaboration between rock band Aerosmith and rap duo Run-DMC on their remake of the former's hit, "Walk This Way". The book received positive reviews across the press. In The Atlantic, James Parker wrote, "The question with a book like this—a book that zeroes in on a particular happening or art moment and then extrapolates boomingly outward—is always: Is there enough there? Enough action at the core, that is, and enough concentrically moving energy to prevent the narrative from collapsing in on itself as it stretches to book length? The answer in this case, I am happy to report, is yes." The Boston Globe's Rob Sheffield called it "a cultural detective yarn," and praised Edgers' "valiant gumshoe work."

== Personal life ==
Edgers is married to Carlene Hempel, a professor at Northeastern University. They live outside Boston and have two children together, Lila and Calvin Hempel-Edgers.
