= Do It Again (film) =

- Poster. Artwork by David Plunkert.
- Directed by: Robert Patton-Spruill
- Written by: Geoff Edgers
- Produced by: Geoff Edgers; Josh Struzziery and Jeffrey Currie (Executive producers); Patricia Moreno (co-producer)
- Starring: Geoff Edgers; Sting; Zooey Deschanel; Paul Weller; Clive Davis; Peter Buck; Robyn Hitchcock; Dave Davies; Mick Avory; Bob Henrit; Warren Zanes
- Edited by: Brad Allen Wilde
- Music by: The Kinks; Warren Zanes
- Release date: 2010
- Country: United States
- Language: English

Do It Again is a 2010 documentary film directed by Robert Patton-Spruill and produced by Boston Globe reporter Geoff Edgers. The film follows Edgers on his quest to reunite British rock band the Kinks. Along the way he interviews several musicians and celebrities (including Sting, Zooey Deschanel, and Clive Davis), discussing with them the band's music and influence, as well as their sentiments towards a potential Kinks reunion. Shooting for Do It Again began in the spring of 2008, and it made its debut at the Rotterdam International Film Festival in January 2010. Do It Again showed at several film festivals around the world throughout 2010, and was picked up for broadcast on public television in late 2011.

== Plot ==
Geoff Edgers is a reporter for The Boston Globe. Facing a mid-life crisis, he decides to embark on a quest to reunite his favorite band, the Kinks. Founded in 1964 by oft-feuding brothers Ray and Dave Davies, the group split in 1996 due to creative tension and poor record sales. Edgers travels around America, interviewing and gaining the support of several personalities, including Sting, Paul Weller, Peter Buck, Zooey Deschanel, Clive Davis, Warren Zanes, and Robyn Hitchcock.

Edgers eventually travels to London in an attempt to bring together the Kinks' original lineup: the Davies brothers, Pete Quaife, and Mick Avory. Edgers interviews Avory and visits the annual Kinks fan club convention at the Boston Arms pub, where he talks to former drummer Bob Henrit. Ray Davies makes a surprise visit at the convention. He refuses to give an interview to Edgers and requests that the crew not film his performance with the Kast Off Kinks.

Later, Edgers is informed that Dave Davies is willing to grant an interview. They meet at an undisclosed location outside London and discuss Dave's relationship with his brother. Dave comments that "I think Ray was probably happy ... for a whole three years in his life, and that was from the age of zero to three, when I wasn't there, and I think I kind of rained on his parade a bit ... I think sadly, it never went away." At the end of the conversation, Edgers and Davies play the song "Strangers" together. He then returns home to Boston. As the credits roll, Edgers and a classroom of children sing "Weird Al" Yankovic's parody of the Kinks' 1970 hit "Lola", "Yoda".

== Production ==
"Do It Again" was filmed over a period of two years, largely in Boston but with shoots also in London, New York and Los Angeles. The film was edited by Emerson graduate Brad Allen Wilde, one of Patton-Spruill's former students, and more than a dozen other Emerson students were involved in its production. During filming, Edgers requested interviews with more than 60 musicians and was rejected by over 50, including Aimee Mann, Jack White, Eddie Van Halen, and the band Green Day. Edgers and Patton-Spruill consulted with writer Tom Perrotta, Super Size Me director Morgan Spurlock, and Buffalo Tom's Bill Janovitz.

== Release ==
=== Festivals ===
Do It Again premiered at the Rotterdam International Film Festival on January 28, 2010. Other notable screening locations included Full Frame Documentary Film Festival, Cleveland International Film Festival, Independent Film Festival of Boston, Nashville Film Festival, Taipei Film Festival, Indianapolis International Film Festival, and Pusan International Film Festival.

=== Television ===
In December 2010 it was announced that a 57-minute cut of Do It Again had been accepted for US television broadcast on public television. Do It Again was picked up by stations in Boston, Austin, Hawaii, Connecticut, Louisiana, Oregon, Wichita and Atlanta. The broadcast debut was set for 9:00 p.m. on September 15, 2011, on WGBH Boston.

== Reception ==
Do It Again received generally positive reviews. Variety called the film a "crowdpleaser that will connect even with auds unfamiliar with the Kinks' legacy", and The Huffington Post gave it a positive review, summarizing it as "a hilarious romp and clever distraction from a crumbling America and the middle class barbecue. In fact, this film is more. Like a sneaky octopus, it wraps you up, and when squeezing the laughter out of you, out flies a picture of your life." Shaula Clark of the Boston Phoenix gave Do It Again a negative review, but noted that "marvelous things occasionally happen — his off-the-cuff jam session with Sting is electrifying. And whether Edgers delights or horrifies you, you’ll likely spend the film muttering, 'I can’t believe he’s doing this.'" Sean O'Connell of Hollywoodnews.com noted that the film, "as all good docs do, draws us into Edgers' personal mission, and we suffer as this journalist deals with salary cuts at his unstable job and wince as Ray (and his publicity associates) plays hard-to-get with Edgers' dream. ... It's a rollicking trip through music history, and a worthy personal journey too many of us will be able to relate to."
