= Lime (transportation company) =

American micromobility company

Neutron Holdings, Inc.

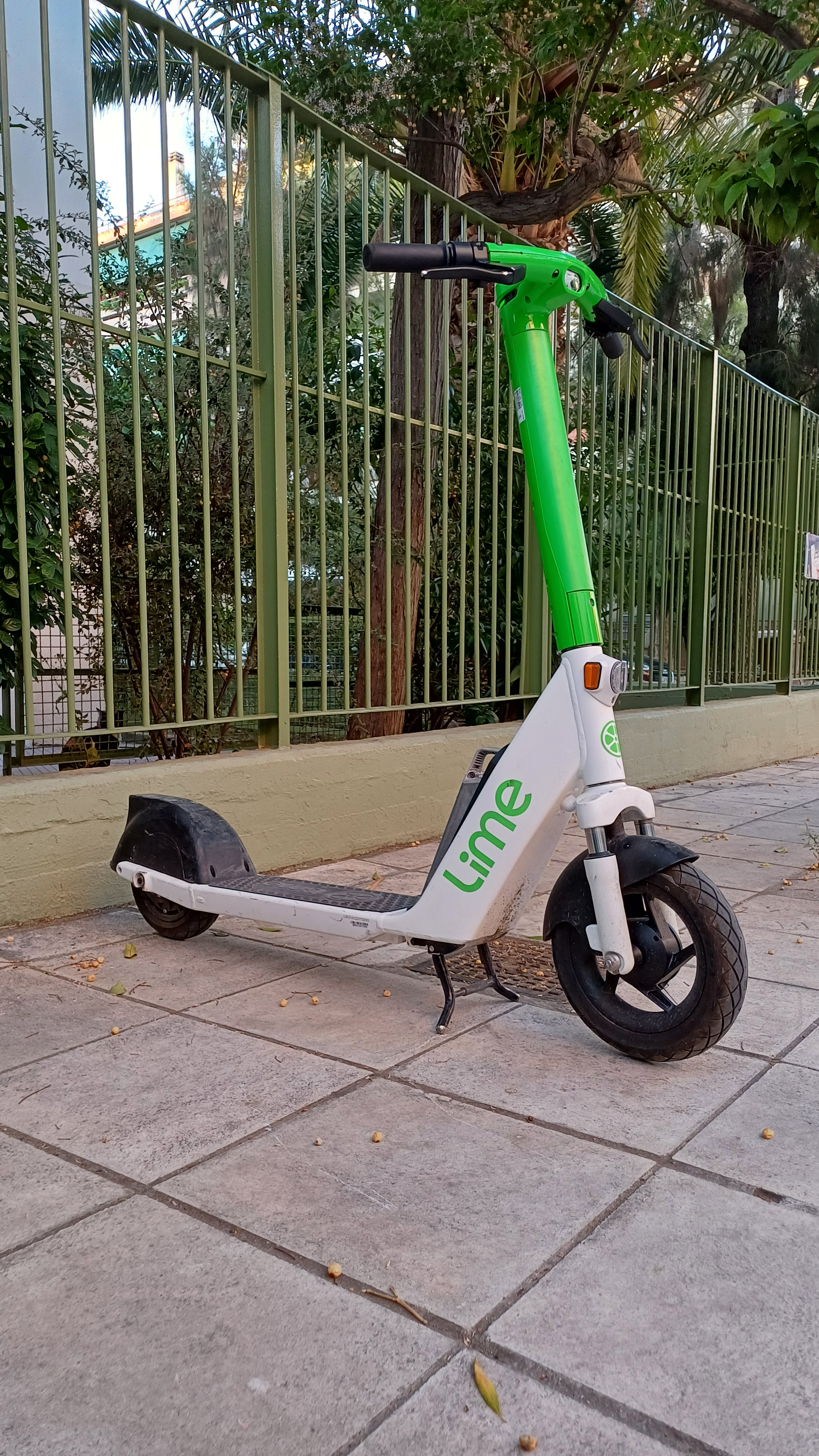
- Type: Public
- Industry: Dockless electric scooter sharing, dockless bike sharing
- Founded: January 2017; 9 years ago San Francisco, California, US
- Founder: Brad Bao; Toby Sun
- Headquarters: California
- Area served: Asia, Europe, Middle East, North America, Oceania, & South America.
- Key people: Brad Bao (Chairman); Wayne Ting (CEO)
- Website: www.li.me

Neutron Holdings, Inc., doing business under the name Lime, formerly LimeBike, is an American transportation company based in San Francisco, California. It runs electric scooters, electric bikes, and electric mopeds in more than 200 cities in nearly 30 countries around the world. The system offers dockless vehicles that users find and unlock via a smartphone app that knows the location of available vehicles via GPS.

== History ==
=== Company ===
LimeBike was founded in January 2017 by Brad Bao and Toby Sun, both of whom were executives of Fosun International's venture capital arm. It raised US$12 million in venture funding led by Andreessen Horowitz in March 2017. The company closed a Series B round of venture funding in October 2017, announcing that it was valued at $225 million. A $335 million funding round in 2018 led to a valuation of $1.1 billion for the company, making it a unicorn.

In August 2018, the company signed a deal with Uber to provide them with electric bikes for the expansion of their Uber Bikes service.

In May 2019, co-founder and chief executive officer Toby Sun stepped down reportedly to focus on R&D while Brad Bao, a Lime co-founder, took his place as CEO.

In September 2019, Lime was recognized as one of the LinkedIn's Top Startups for 2019. This was the first time Lime has been listed, and it was ranked at No. 12 amongst the list of 50 startups.

In January 2020, Lime laid off about 100 employees, approximately 14 percent of its workforce, and ended its scooter rental service in a dozen markets, including Atlanta, Phoenix, San Diego and San Antonio. Further layoffs in April were attributed to the COVID-19 pandemic, with the CEO saying, "We had to pause operations in 99% of our markets worldwide to support cities’ efforts at social distancing." Starting in March 2020, due to reduced demand for electric scooters during the COVID-19 lockdown in 2020, Lime suspended services in nearly two dozen countries.

Lime acquired the Jump e-bike and scooter business from Uber in May 2020, along with a $170 million funding round led by Uber, with Bain Capital Ventures and GV participating. The deal valued Lime at $510 million, down 79% from its $2.4 billion valuation in April 2019. At the same time, Brad Bao stepped down as CEO, replaced by Wayne Ting.

In November 2020, Lime reported the first profitable quarter and predicted 2021 full-year profitability.

In April 2021, Lime is listed as one of the 2021 Time100 Most Influential Companies by Time magazine.

In November 2021, Lime closed an oversubscribed funding round raising $523 million and announced an intention to take the company public in 2022. The company also announced in 2021 that riders had surpassed 250 million rides using Lime services, making it the largest shared micromobility operator globally in terms of total trips.

In May 2026, Lime filed an S-1 registration statement with the SEC for a proposed initial public offering on the Nasdaq Global Select Market under the ticker symbol LIME, with Goldman Sachs and JPMorgan serving as lead underwriters; the company reported revenue of $886.7 million in 2025, a 29% increase year-over-year.

=== User base ===
As of October 2017, Lime had 150,000 users. In April 2024, Lime claimed to have recorded 156 million rides in 2023, its highest ever total annual ride count to date.

=== Locations ===
The company's first location, University of North Carolina at Greensboro, was launched in June 2017 with 125 bicycles. LimeBike expanded in July 2017 to the cities of Key Biscayne, Florida; South Bend, Indiana; and South Lake Tahoe, California. On July 27, 2017, LimeBike launched with 500 bicycles in Seattle, Washington, becoming the city's second bikeshare operator.

== Vehicles ==
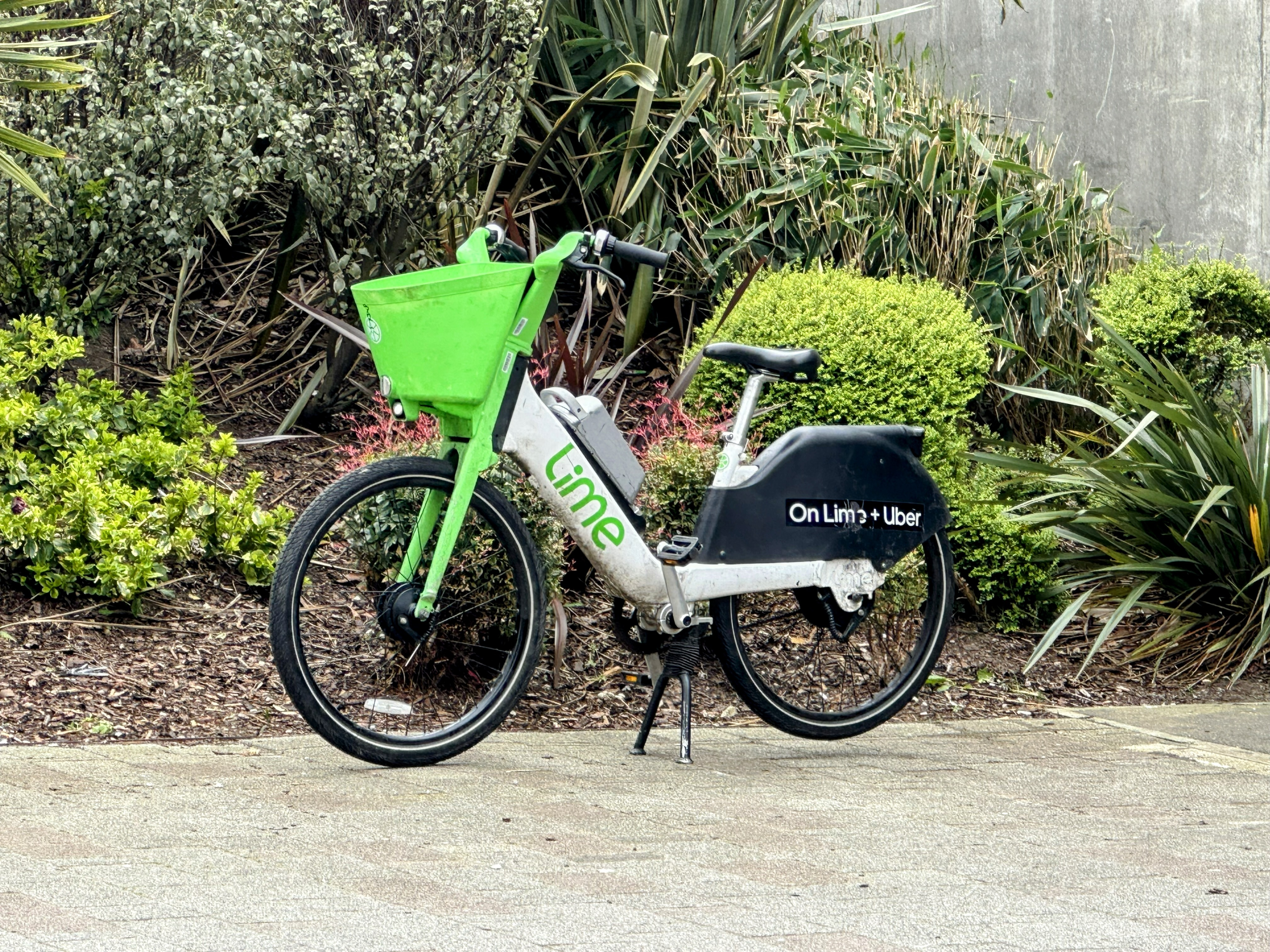
A Lime electric bicycle

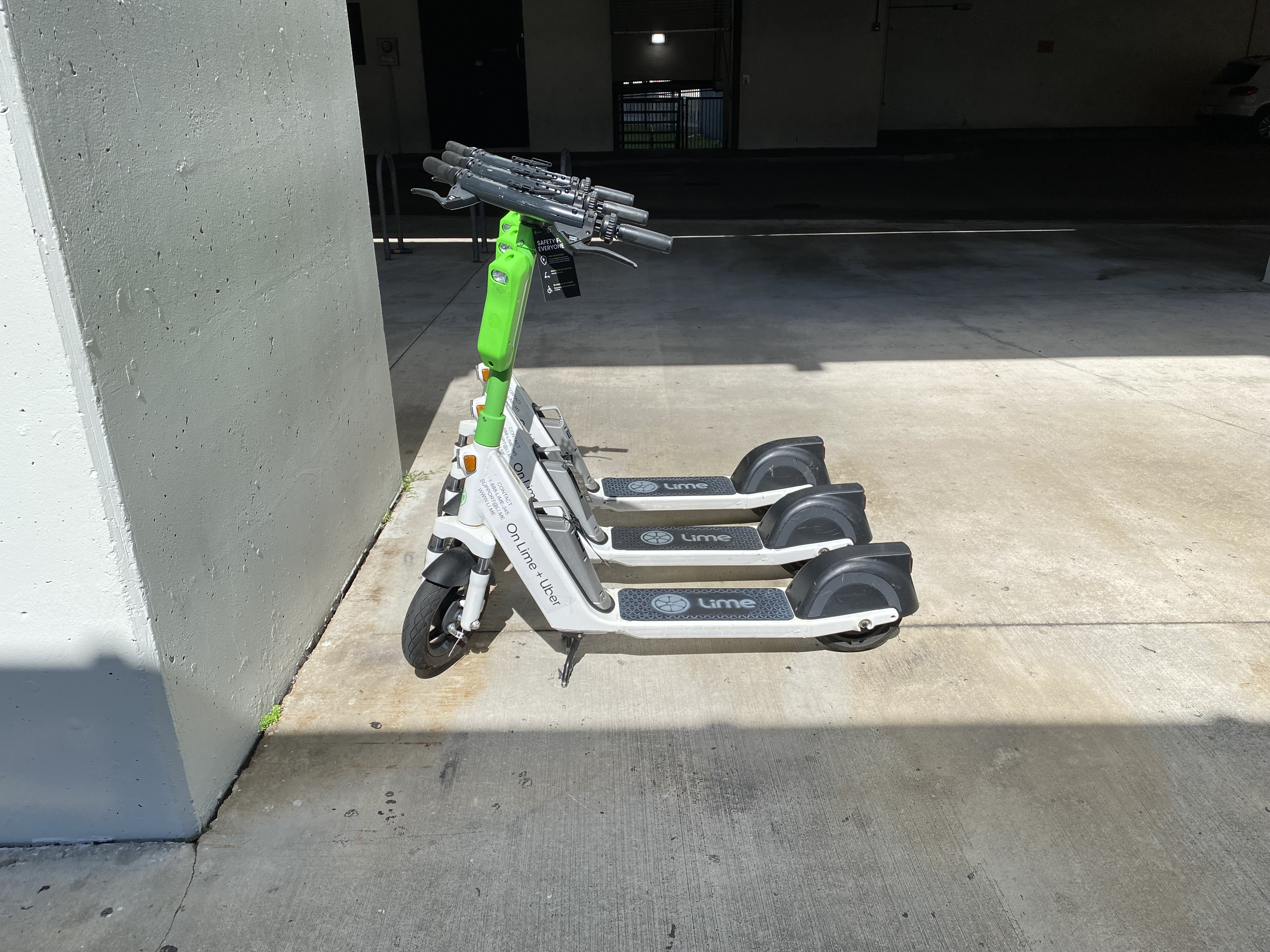
Lime electric scooters

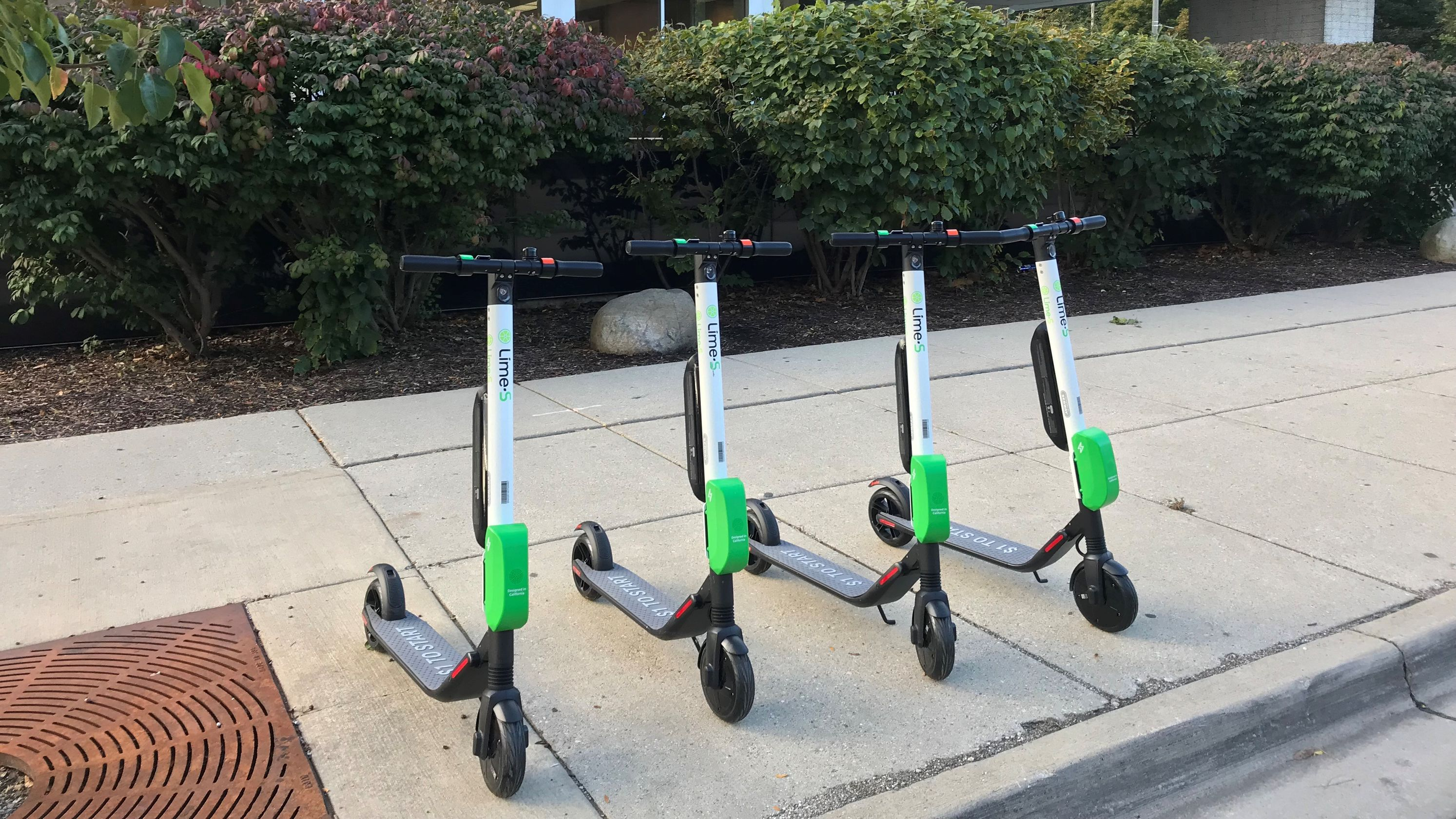
Lime first generation scooters

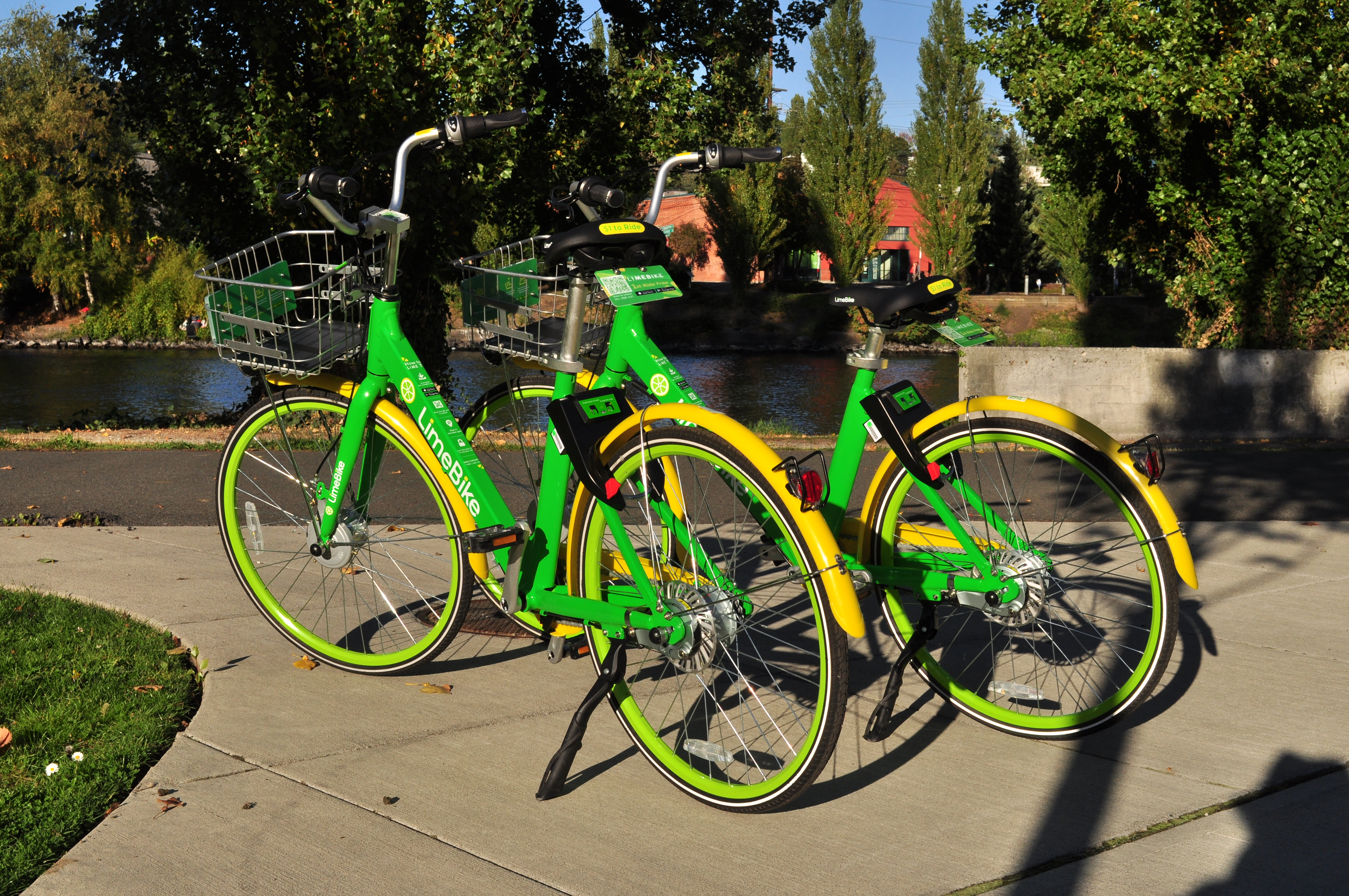
Lime Bike B

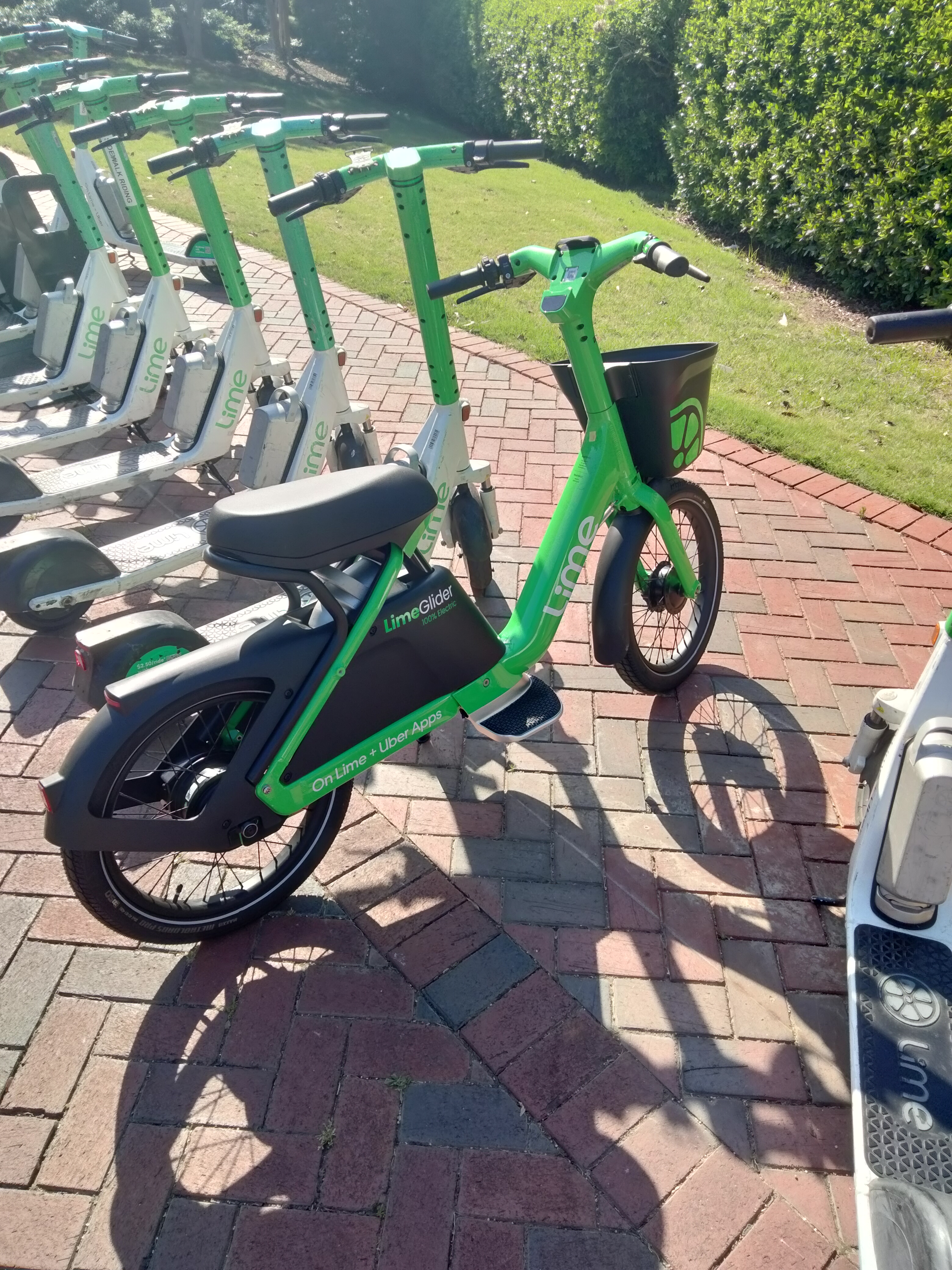
A LimeGlider parked beside Lime scooters

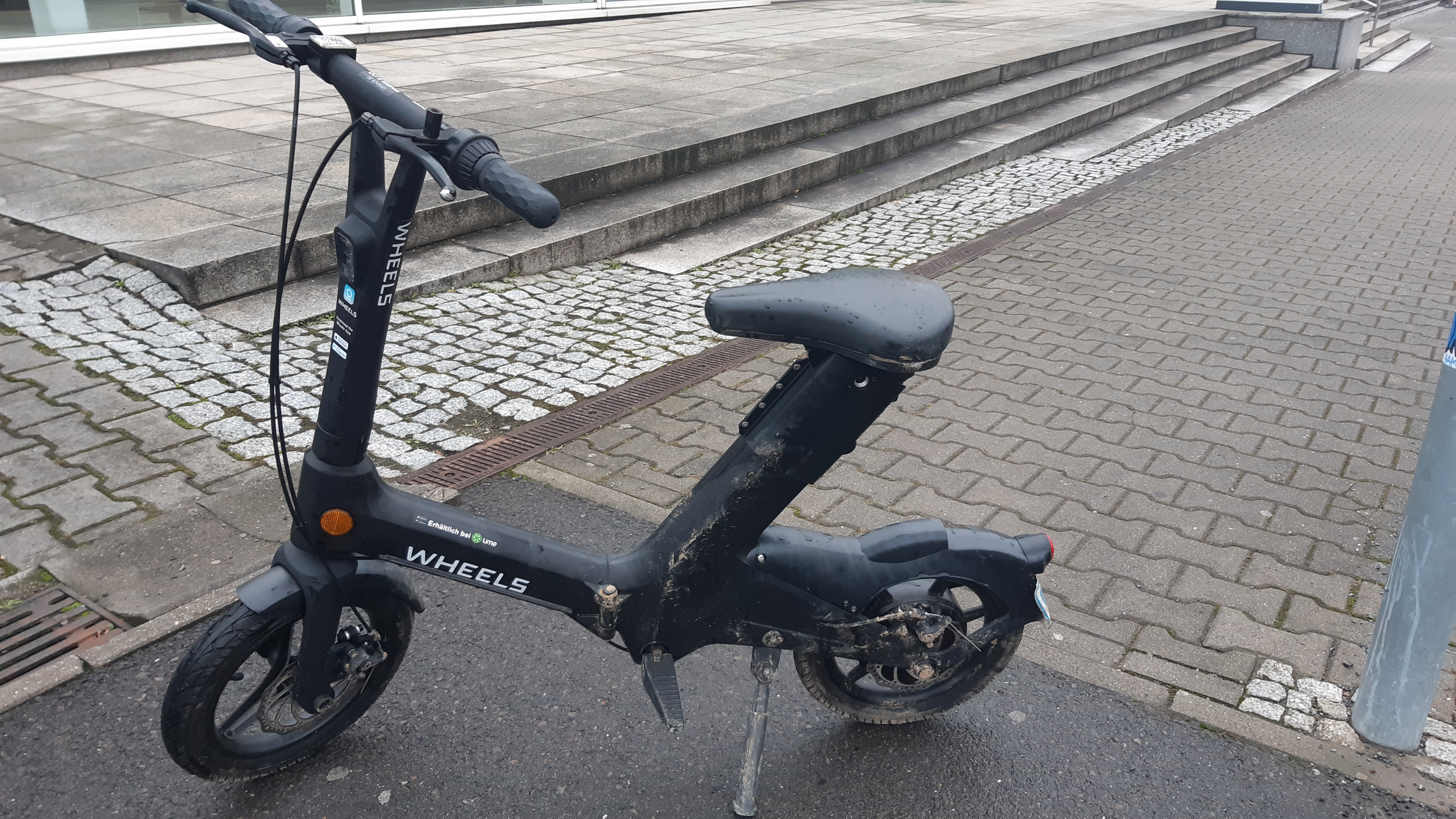
A Wheels scooter, seen and photographed in 2022 in front of the Dynamo sports hall at the Sportforum Hohenschönhausen, Berlin, Germany

In January 2018, Lime announced at CES 2018 that they would begin a trial of electric bikes, branded Lime-E, in San Francisco. The following month Lime-S electric scooters were announced.

In May 2018, the company announced plans to begin development of transit pods, small self-driving electric vehicles. Lime applied for car-sharing permits in Seattle in October 2018 and later launched a service in December 2018 with a fleet of Fiat 500 Lounge cars branded as "LimePod".

In October 2018 Lime announced the release of a new model e-scooter with larger wheels, built-in suspension and an aluminum frame to combat vandalism and extend vehicle life.

In April 2020, Lime is reported to have acquired assets of electric skateboard startup Boosted.

== Usage ==
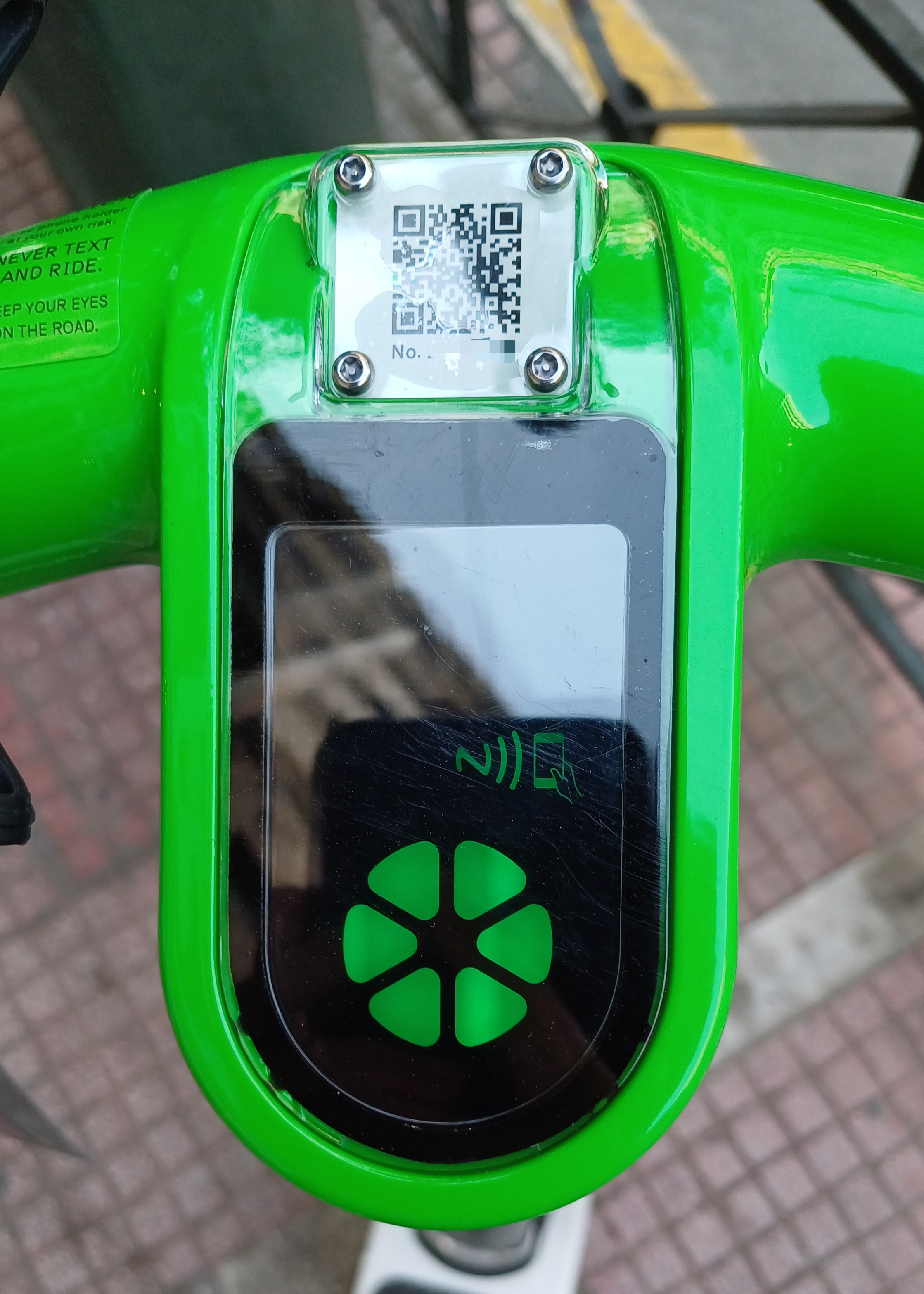
Scooter dashboard

The user installs the Lime app on a device (typically a smartphone), on which are displayed all the vehicles available (tracked by GPS) nearby. Before starting a trip, the user supplies payment information. The user then scans the QR code on the vehicle, beginning the trip. To end the trip, the user parks the vehicle then ends the ride through the app. The price of the trip is immediately withdrawn from the user's payment method, unless using a pre-loaded Ride Pass. Lime requires users to take a picture of the parked vehicle and its surroundings to review whether the vehicle was parked improperly. If any problems were encountered with the trip (like a malfunctioning vehicle) the user can report it through the app.

=== Locations ===
As of March 2022, Lime operated in more than 150 cities across more than 30 countries.

As part of trials approved by the UK Department for Transport, Lime began operating e-scooters in the UK—where the use of e-scooters outside of trials remains illegal in public—from mid-2020. In 2021 Lime trial areas in the UK currently include Greater Manchester and Milton Keynes. A trial in London, operated by Dott, Lime and TIER Mobility commenced in June 2021.

In selected cities in Australia, Lime operates both its scooter and bikes.

=== Vehicles ===
Lime, depending on location, uses three different types of vehicles.

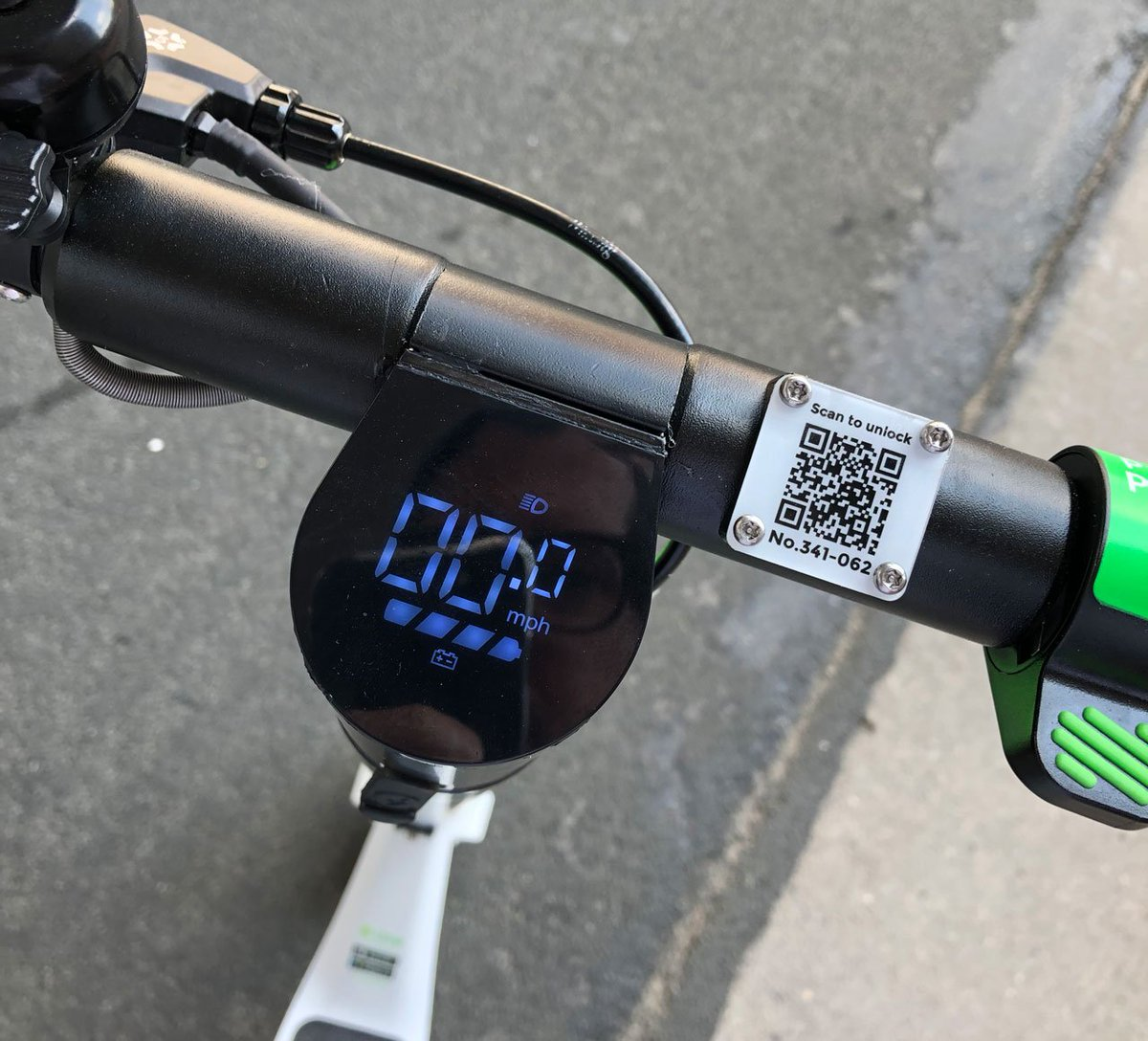
Users scan the QR code to unlock the scooter.

==== Lime-S ====
Four different electric scooter models are currently in use:

- Lime-S Ninebot ES4, made by Segway with extra battery attached on to the main pole.
- Lime-S Generation 2
- Lime-S Generation 3, designed in-house by Lime.
- Lime-S Generation 4, designed in-house by Lime.
- Lime-S Generation 4.1, designed in-house by Lime.

== Safety ==
=== Injuries and deaths ===
==== Injuries ====
In June 2020, the Australian Competition & Consumer Commission found Lime did not comply with mandatory injury reporting requirements for its older Gen 2 scooters. The Australian Competition and Consumer Commission considered Lime became aware of at least 50 occasions since 16 November 2018 of the "use, or foreseeable misuse" of Gen 2 e-scooters in Australia that caused (or may have caused) injury.

In 2025 an investigation found that many people in London had sustained severe and lifelong 'motorcycle like' crushing leg injuries from Lime bikes due to the weight and design of the bikes and a lack of maintenance.

==== Deaths ====
In September 2018, a 24-year-old man in Dallas, Texas, in United States died in a single vehicle Lime scooter accident. The responding police officer found a Lime electric scooter broken in half about 500 feet from where the victim was found unresponsive.

In February 2019, a Fort Lauderdale Lime user was placed in a vegetative state after a collision with a car while riding a Lime scooter on the road, not the legally permitted sidewalk use. The injured woman was allegedly instructed to use the road by Lime's app.

=== Malfunctions ===
Some of Lime's electric scooters have been recalled due to mechanical failures. In October 2018, Lime recalled a number of its Segway Ninebot scooters after cases of batteries "smoldering, or in some cases, catching fire".

In November 2018, Lime issued a recall of its Okai-model scooters on reports that the baseboards could "break in half". The recall was issued following internal comments by employees that its scooters were unsafe for public use.

In February 2019, Lime issued a safety update, announcing that some of its scooters could malfunction and their wheels could "lock up". The company was forced to temporarily withdraw its scooters from circulation in Auckland and Dunedin, New Zealand, after injuries caused by irregular braking incidents. According to Consumer Reports, affected Lime scooters had buggy faulty firmware.

== Use of contractors ==
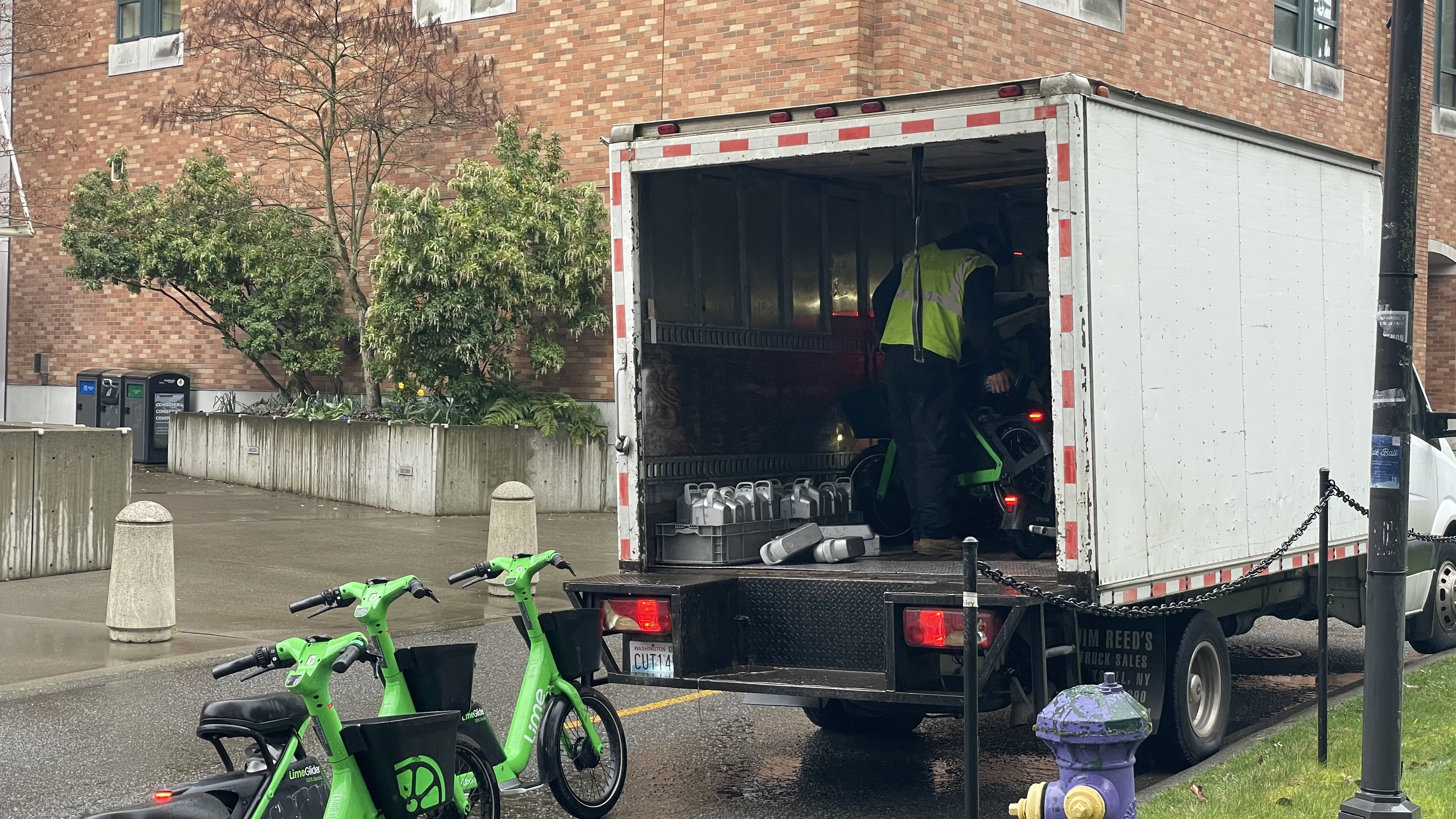
The wide step in the rear allows one worker to load heavy e-bikes.

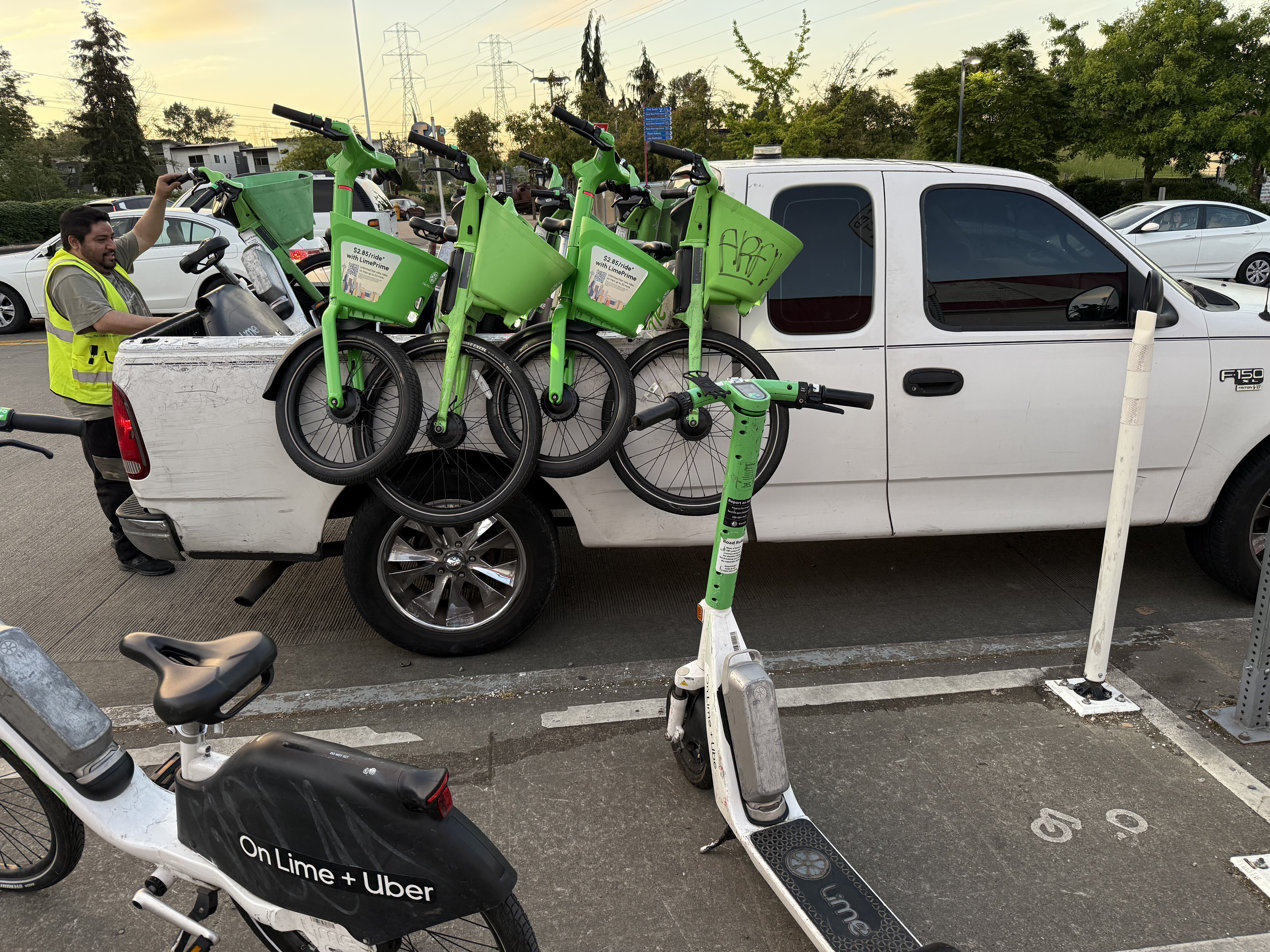
A contractor using a pickup.

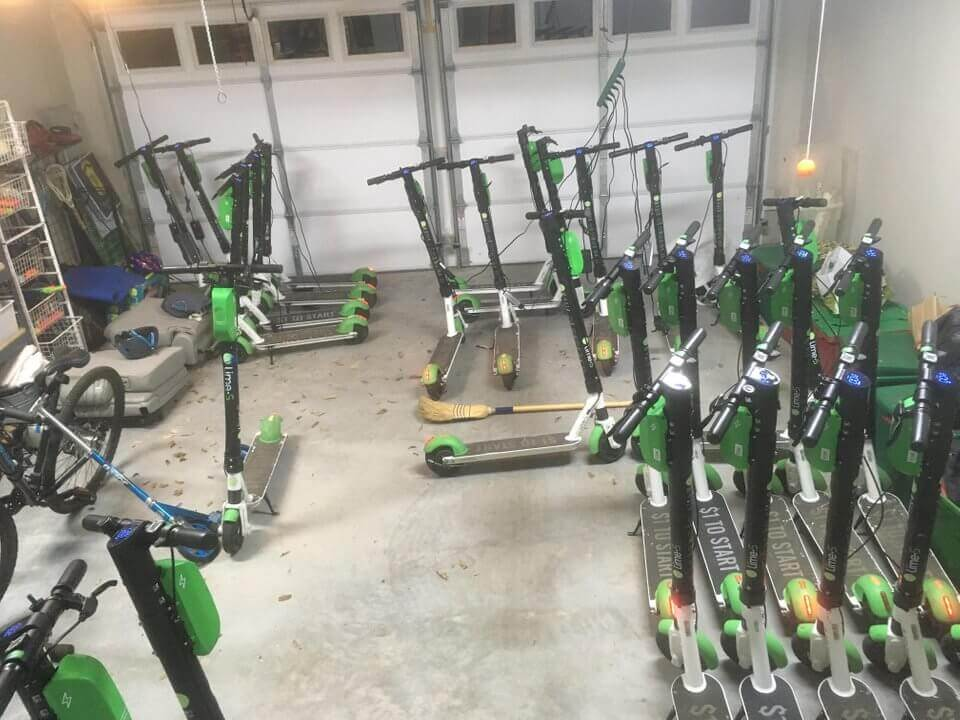
Lime Juicer

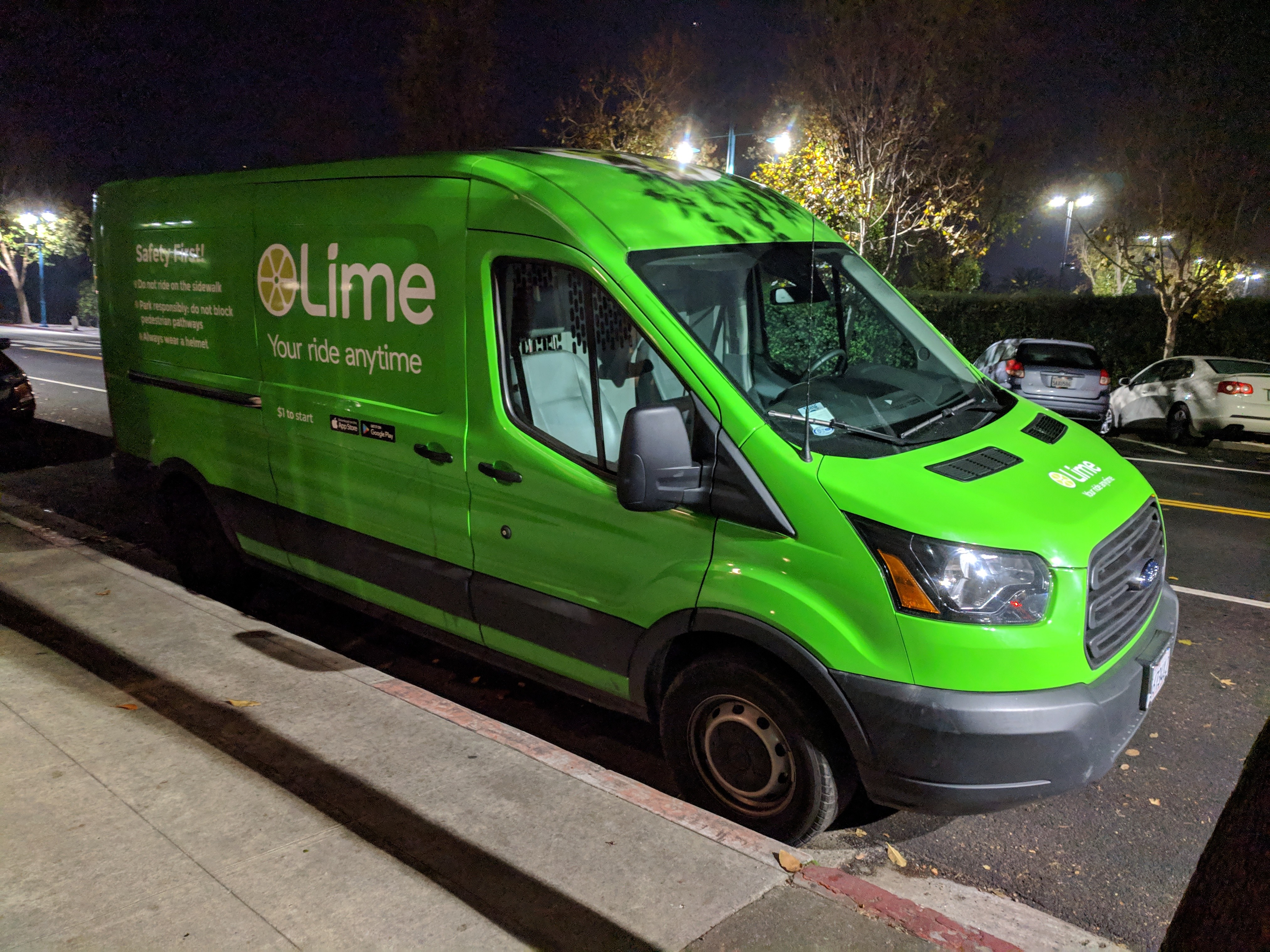
Lime transport van

In some locations, Lime scooters are charged by private contractors who sign up to become "Juicers". The company sends approved Juicers charging equipment, and pays them to charge or swap batteries in the scooters overnight then place them at designated "LimeHubs" throughout the company's service area in the morning. Juicing can become competitive, with Juicers in some markets using vans and other creative means to pick up scooters all over a city.

Lime also operates some cities exclusively with its own staff.

== Parking ==
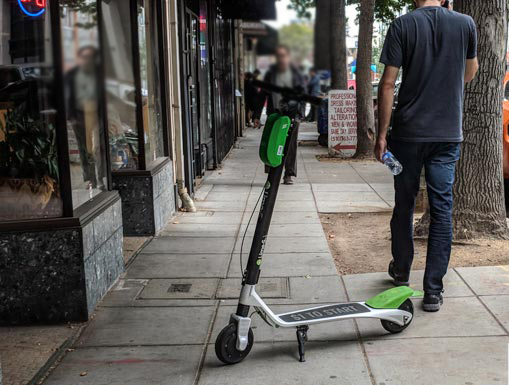
Lime scooter on a sidewalk in Oakland, California

There is no set policy on parking for Lime Bikes around the world. Some cities require riders to park in designated parking spots. In Vienna, Austria, for example, the company states: "Parking on a sidewalk in Vienna is never an option and will systemically result in a fine of 10 EUR."

There was criticism in April 2018 when Lime left several hundred scooters on the streets of US cities without the permission of municipal authorities. Public criticism increased in June when it emerged that the scooters were programmed to play a recording of the message "Unlock me to ride me, or I'll call the police" repeatedly, at high volume, when their controls were touched.

By contrast, London riders are instructed to park on the pavements, but do so properly. In London, some London boroughs tell riders to park in designated areas but others allow so called free-floating parking on pavements. According to a 2023 report by consultancy Steer and funded by Lime Bikes: "Services are currently regulated on a borough-by-borough basis via individual agreements with local authorities. These agreements use different operational and user parking requirements. This creates confusion for riders with regard to where to park which can create obstructions for pedestrians, particularly those with access issues."

The Lime Bike-sponsored report recommended that riders are required to leave their bikes at designated parking locations in London. However, it also found that 50% of Lime riders said they would not walk more than two minutes to pick up or drop off a Lime e-bike at a designated parking location. The report also stated that a full network of more than 10,000 designated locations in London could cost up to £20 million.

== Conflicts with local authorities ==
=== Australia ===
Older Gen 2 scooters could have excessive brake force on the front wheel in certain specific circumstances in late 2018 to early 2019. Lime fixed an issue with a software update on February 19, 2019 and published a blog post announcing the fix 4 days later, but did not notify the Australian Competition and Consumer Commission within 2 days. Before the update the older scooters were available for 4 days in Adelaide, and for 3 months in Brisbane, and the issue affected 0.0045% of Lime rides.

Lime conducted laboratory testing with internal and external experts to identify the issue, and found the rare cases usually involved riding downhill at top speed while hitting a pothole or obstacle. The number of "Unexpected Stopping incidents" was not 50, but some occasions in addition. In the media, the Pedestrian Council of Australia was "leading the push" for scooter reforms. The chairman Harold Scruby stated he believed riders should have licences, and claimed "You're better off being hit by a car."

In 2026, the City of Yarra removed permission for Lime share bikes in the council area. The advocacy group Streets Alive Yarra told ABC News this was a "step backwards", and issues were partly caused by the City of Yarra not providing on street bicycle parking spaces or separated bike lanes. The group had previously advocated for the council to provide on-road share bike parking. The mayor Stephen Jolly claimed Lime used concerns about climate change as a smokescreen.

=== USA ===
==== Milwaukee ====
Scooters were initially banned in Milwaukee when Bird Rides Inc. started their scooter business without permission. Wisconsin's Governor Tony Evers signed a bill July 11, 2019 regulating scooters. Shortly after the Governor's decision, Lime began operating in Milwaukee in a pilot program, until the city again halted scooter rentals because of complaints about riders riding on sidewalks. Lime wanted to increase its fleet of 500 scooters in the Milwaukee area but were denied permission.

==== San Francisco ====
In September 2018, Lime sued San Francisco for denying Lime a permit. Lime had been operating in San Francisco without permission and received a cease-and-desist letter.

=== London, UK ===
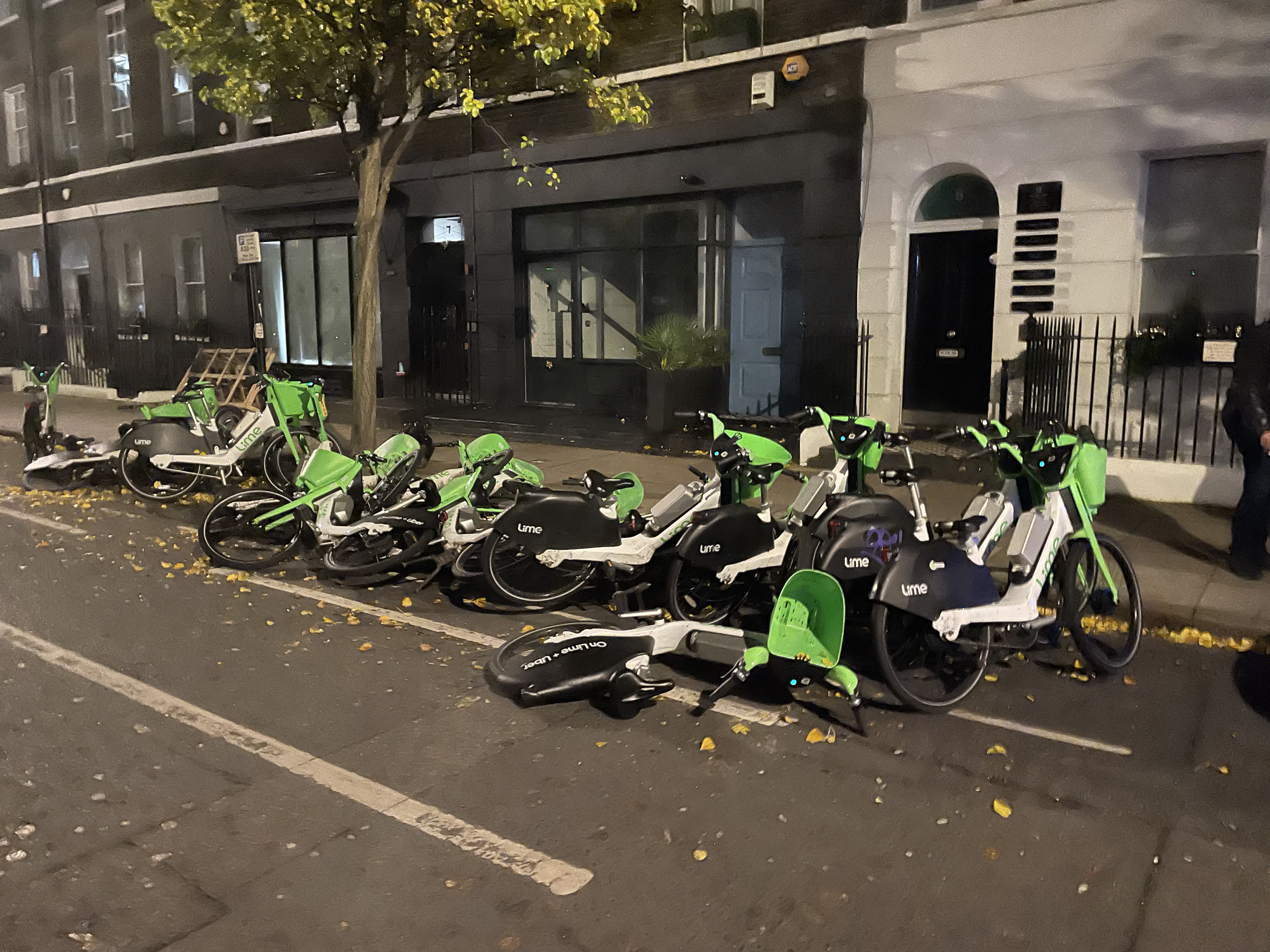
Badly parked Lime Bikes on Percy Street, London in 2024

==== Brent Council ====
In September 2024, Brent Council in north-west London told Lime that it must remove its dockless e-bikes from the borough the following month if it continued to ignore the council's safety concerns and suggestions for improvements to the scheme.

"E-bikes have come with significant safety concerns, which Lime has not currently addressed to the council's satisfaction … Of particular concern is the already high and increasing number of incidents of inconsiderately parked and abandoned e-bikes reported to the council daily and the often slow response time by Lime to remove these", a council statement said.

To settle the dispute, Lime Bikes agreed in October to: introduce 200 new parking bays, reduce the size of its fleet in Brent by a third, increase the number of Lime cyclist patrollers and parking wardens in Brent by 78% and remove inappropriately parked bikes within two hours of being reported.

==== London Mayor ====
Complaints about the use of Lime bikes has risen, especially as improper parking obstructing pedestrians is widespread. London mayor Sir Sadiq Khan has said that it is "great that more and more Londoners are cycling, but it's the Wild West ... Regulation has not caught up with the pace of people's desire to use cycle hire bikes."

"One council has a certain set of rules, another council does not allow the bikes, another council has a different set of rules. We should have one system across London and we are lobbying the government to have a pan-London system of regulation", he added.

2026 London Fields Jousting Incident

In October 2026, two individuals dressed in medieval-style armor staged a "jousting" performance using Lime electric-bicycles in London Fields, Hackney, which subsequently went viral on social media, attracting hundreds of spectators. Lime subsequently issued a statement emphasising that its electric bicycles "are not designed for jousting," discouraging others from imitating the event due to safety concerns.

==== Wandsworth ====
In 2022, the leader of London's Wandsworth Council, Simon Hogg, wrote to the CEO of Lime Bikes drawing attention to the issues caused by e-bikes. The following year the council stated that insufficient action has been taken by the company to resolve the issue.

Hogg stated: "We receive daily complaints about Lime Bikes blocking pavements, and when I raised this with the company last year they said they would be taking steps to solve this problem. Unfortunately the actions they have taken have not ensured sustained improvements in the situation and removing Lime Bikes obstructing pavements continues to be necessary." This issue has yet to be resolved.

==== Westminster ====
Westminster City Council has repeatedly called for the government to introduce legislation to address the limited regulatory powers to manage dockless bike schemes in England. In October 2023 Councillor Paul Dimoldenberg, cabinet member for City Management and Air Quality, said; "The popularity of hire e-bikes has exploded over the last year, but unfortunately the council has received many complaints about bikes being left in the middle of the pavement creating a safety hazard for pedestrians."

Bromley

In August 2026, Jason Beale of Penge, along with his wife Jessica complained to local MP Liam Conlon about the "very frightening experience" of being forced to walk him and his guide dog out into the road due to Lime bikes being poorly parked, thereby blocking pavements. Jessica has also been injured by walking into a Lime bike.

Lime had been operating in Bromley under an allegedly non-contractual scheme without the permission of the council, putting this down to "a technical issue in which the map for neighbouring Lewisham mistakenly covered parts of Bromley."

=== Rome, Italy ===
Lime was introduced in Rome under the condition that holders of the annual "metrebus" transport pass would receive 3 rides, each one up to 30 minutes, per day for free. However, 2 years into the scheme, after widespread reports that Lime was failing to abide by the deal, the Italian Guardia di Finanza started a case investigating Lime for breach of anti-trust laws.

=== Cease-and-desist letters ===
Lime has received cease-and-desist letters from numerous cities across the US, including Reno and Indianapolis.
