= Wayne Ting =

American entrepreneur and investor (born 1983)

- Born: December 1, 1983 (age 42)
- Education: Columbia University (BA); Harvard University (MBA)
- Title: CEO, Lime

Wayne Ting (born December 1, 1983) is an American entrepreneur, investor, and business executive. He is currently the CEO of Lime.

== Early life and education ==
Ting was born in the United States and spent his early childhood in Taiwan before his family settled in Lincoln, Nebraska. He was educated at Lincoln East High School and Northfield Mount Hermon School in Massachusetts. Ting graduated from Columbia University and Harvard Business School. At Columbia, he was class president and co-founded CU Community, later renamed CampusNetwork, an early competitor to Facebook.

== Career ==
In 2009, Ting helped organized the National Equality March, which drew between 100,000 and 200,000 people to demand LGBTQ equality in Washington DC.

Ting worked at Bain Capital and at McKinsey & Company before serving as a Senior Policy Advisor on the National Economic Council under President Barack Obama from 2012 to 2014.

From 2014 to 2018, Ting worked at Uber, where he was chief of staff to CEO Dara Khosrowshahi and managed its Northern California business.

In 2018, Ting joined Lime as its Global Head of Operations and Strategy. He was named CEO of the company in 2020, replacing company co-founder Brad Bao, who remains chairman. In November 2021, Ting announced intentions to take the company public in 2022.

Ting is also an investor who invested in startups such as Dispo and All Day Kitchens.

== Recognition ==
In 2022, Ting was named as one of the Out100 honorees. Ting was also named one of Fast Company's Most Creative People in Business 2023.

== Personal life ==
Ting resides in Santa Fe, New Mexico, with his husband, Stathis G Yeros.
