= Barbara Quintiliani =

American opera singer

Barbara Quintiliani (born September 24, 1976) is an American operatic soprano.

Born in Quincy, Massachusetts, Quintiliani graduated from the New England Conservatory of Music before joining young artists programs, first with the Houston Grand Opera and the Washington National Opera. In 1999 she took a National Grand Prize in the Metropolitan Opera National Council Auditions; in 2006 she took first prize in the International Singing Contest Francisco Viñas, becoming the first American woman in over a quarter-century to do so. Her American operatic debut came in 2002 with Washington National Opera, when she performed Elettra in Idomeneo; this was also the role of her international debut in 2006, with the Liceu. Quintiliani has specialized in the works of Giuseppe Verdi and Gaetano Donizetti. In particular, she has become associated with the title role in the latter's Maria Padilla, which she first performed at the Wexford Festival in 2009. As a concert artist, she has performed such works as the Ninth Symphony of Ludwig van Beethoven and Knoxville: Summer of 1915, and for the Naxos label she has recorded the Three Poems of Fiona MacLeod by Charles Tomlinson Griffes.

Quintiliani has multiple sclerosis and eosinophilic granulomatosis with polyangiitis.

Geoff Edgers was awarded a New England Emmy in June 2013 for work on a video for The Boston Globe entitled "Behind the Curtain: Act One of Barbara Quintiliani's Story", a ten-minute documentary about Quintiliani's life and career; he shared the award with producer Darren Durlach.
