= Robert Patton-Spruill =

American film director

- Born: Roxbury, Massachusetts, U.S.
- Occupations: Film director, screenwriter, film producer, educator

Robert Patton-Spruill is an independent film director, screenwriter, producer, professor, distiller, and real estate developer. His company, FilmShack, was based in Boston. Spruill lives in Winchester, New Hampshire where he founded New England Sweetwater Farm and Distillery in 2015. Spruill was a professor at Emerson College, where he was Director in Residence until his retirement in 2020.

== Biography ==
Spruill was born in Roxbury and raised by theatre artists James Spruill and Lynda Patton, who worked with the New African Company. He is a second cousin of Boston's first black and first female mayor Kim Janey through his maternal side. He attended Boston University as a history major, but decided to pursue film instead. He wrote the screenplay for his first film Squeeze while still in college. Squeeze (1997) was shot on a US$155,000 budget, and was cast with young Boston theatre students whom Spruill taught at the Dorchester Youth Collaborative. Squeeze was bought by Miramax at the Los Angeles Independent Film Festival. Patton-Spruill later moved back to Boston where he subsequently directed three more films. He resides in Winchester, New Hampshire with his wife and his only child.

== Films and career ==
After his first film, Patton-Spruill directed Body Count (1998), a straight-to-video Showtime feature. He and his wife Patti Moreno over a 10-year period opened their own production company, studio, and rental business for low-budget filmmakers in his home town of Roxbury, Massachusetts. Since the opening of FilmShack in 2000, Spruill and Moreno produced Turntable (AFI Film Festival, 2005). The music video Spruill directed for the hip hop band Public Enemy led to the production of the full-length documentary Welcome to the Terrordome (2007).

Spruill made the documentary Do It Again in 2010, which followed Boston Globe reporter Geoff Edgers on his quest to reunite the classic rock band The Kinks. Do It Again premiered at the Rotterdam International Film Festival on January 28, 2010, and was shown at several film festivals.

Other work directed by Spruill includes Garden Girl TV, a web series starring his wife as Patti Moreno the Garden Girl. The website has produced over 200 how-to videos about urban gardening, and FilmShack produces gardening and home improvement videos for HGTV.com.
