= Edge of Fame =

Podcast hosted by Geoff Edgers

- Genre: Investigative journalism; Documentary; Interview
- Language: English

Cast and voices
- Hosted by: Geoff Edgers

Production
- Production: Geoff Edgers

Technical specifications
- Audio format: Podcast (via streaming or downloadable MP3)

Publication
- Original release: January 24, 2018
- Provider: WBUR, The Washington Post (collaboration)
- Updates: Once a week, sometimes once a month

Related
- Website: www.wbur.org/geoffedgers

Edge of Fame is a podcast hosted by Geoff Edgers and produced as a collaboration between radio station WBUR and The Washington Post. Edgers, drawing on his experience as a journalist, documentary filmmaker, writer, and National Arts Reporter for The Washington Post, investigates the lives of various celebrities and performers on the dark and humorous sides of show business. Each podcast episode focuses on Edgers shadowing a specific performer for a long period of time. Eschewing a typical one-on-one interview style, Edgers assembles a combination of interviews, testimonials, and anecdotes from various voices he encounters along the way.

== Episodes ==
- Norm Macdonald Doesn't Like Endings (January 24, 2018)
- Ava DuVernay Can't Stop, Won't Stop (February 14, 2018)
- Weird Al Is A Walking Party (February 21, 2018)
- Jimmy Kimmel Hates Crying (February 28, 2018)
- Ms. Pat Is The American Dream (March 7, 2018)
- Billy Joe Shaver Isn't Dead Yet (March 14, 2018)
- Hanson Beat The System (March 21, 2018)
- Issa Rae is not Issa Dee (March 28, 2018)
- David Letterman Is Properly Medicated (April 4, 2018)
- R. Kelly Vs. The Savages (May 4, 2018)
- Bonus Live Episode: #MeToo And The Music Industry (June 26, 2018)
