= Bicycle jousting =

Sport

Bicycle jousting is jousting while mounted on a bicycle rather than a horse.

The Black Label Bike Club organise jousts in New York at locations such as Manhattan Bridge. The events are quite boisterous as tall bicycles are used and so the jousters may fall heavily if they are knocked off. The lances used in these events are made from PVC piping.

Bicycle jousting events are held each summer in Amsterdam in the Vondelpark.

In October 2026, artist Jack Carden and actor Cameron Carnegie-Brown (aka "Camtholomew the First") staged a jousting tournament on Lime rental e-bikes in London Fields, Hackney, East London, wearing armor and holding lances. The first event attracted hundreds of spectators, with videos going viral on social media. Organizers characterize it as "performance art" and "community gathering" rather than competitive sport, with the second event raising funds for multiple charities. The lances at the second event were constructed from Balsa wood, and foam.

== See also ==
- Water jousting
