= Squeeze (1997 film) =

- Directed by: Robert Patton-Spruill
- Written by: Robert Patton-Spruill
- Produced by: Stephanie Danan; Patricia Moreno; Ari Newman; Garen Topalian
- Starring: Tyrone D. Burton; Eddie Cutanda; Phuong Duong; Geoffrey Rhue; Russell G. Jones; Leigh Williams
- Cinematography: Richard Moos
- Edited by: Richard Moos
- Music by: Dow Brain; Bruce Flowers
- Production companies: Ca.thar.tic Film Works; Danan/Moreno Films
- Distributed by: Miramax Films
- Release date: June 6, 1997
- Running time: 102 minutes
- Country: United States
- Language: English

Squeeze is a 1997 American crime film written and directed by Robert Patton-Spruill and starring Tyrone D. Burton, Eddie Cutanda, Phuong Duong, Geoffrey Rhue, Russell G. Jones and Leigh Williams. It was released on June 6, 1997, by Miramax Films.

== Plot ==
Having chosen jobs at a gas station over school, 14-year-old friends Tyson (Tyrone Burton), Hector (Eddie Cutanda) and Bao (Phuong Duong) are getting pushed around by some of the older boys in their Boston neighborhood. Despite the stability provided by their relationship with youth club worker J.J. (Geoffrey Rhue), the boys are tempted by the fast money of the drug trade and touched by untimely death. Amid the flurry of mixed messages, the boys must decide which paths to follow.

== Cast ==
- Tyrone D. Burton as Tyson
- Eddie Cutanda as Hector
- Phuong Duong as Bao
- Geoffrey Rhue as JJ
- Russell G. Jones as Tommy
- Leigh Williams as Marcus
- Robert Agredo as Uzi
- Beresford Bennett as Derick
- Jennifer Maxcy as Lisa
- Harlem Logan as Fiend
- Diane Beckett as Aunt C
- Ingrid Askew as Pearl
- James Spruill as Psychiatrist / Homelessman
- William K. Butler as Jason
- Daryl Bugg as Mason
- Maleah Liggins as Tisha
- Pinky Lugo as Pinky
- Milagros Jones as Angela
- Jessica Edwards as Marrisa
- Victor Nunez as Julio

== Release and home media ==
After its June 1997 theatrical release, the film was aired on The WB Network in 2000, and in 2002, it was released on DVD. Lionsgate, later re-released Squeeze on DV.

The was made available on the free streaming service Tubi, in addition to being made available on other digital platforms such as Amazon Prime.
