= Mills Extreme Vehicles =

UK business

Mills Extreme Vehicles (now rebranded as MEV Kit Cars) is a kit car design and manufacturing company based in Gloucestershire, England. MEV was founded in 2003 by Stuart Mills and Julie Wilson and is now owned by Stewart and Sylvia Mutch.

== Current Vehicles ==
=== Exocet ===
The MEV Exocet made its public debut in June 2010 at the Newark kit car show. It is a front-engine, rear-drive, single-donor exoskeleton kit car based on the Mazda MX-5 and was aimed at the novice builder. To this end, the vehicle is designed to make use of as many of the single donor's components with little or no modification.

Although originally based on the Mk1/NA model, the kit has been found to be compatible with the later Mazda MX-5 Mk2 & Mk2.5/NB and more recently the Mk3/NC model

The MX-5 itself has an unusual subframe that allows the body to be removed, leaving the engine, drivetrain and suspension as a rolling assembly which is then transplanted to the Exocet chassis.

It is also made under license in New Zealand, in Australia (since August 2014), and in the USA.

Being a kit car there are variations in the outcome: in the US, where second-hand V8 engines are more affordable, such modifications have been made giving outlandish power/weight ratios; in the UK one builder has modified a Mazda 1.6 Exocet to produce 430 bhp (977 bhp/tonne).

MEV also produce an enhanced version of the Exocet, the Exocet R3, which currently runs its own class in the UK race series regulated by the 750 Motor Club and the MSA.

== Personal Mobility Vehicles ==
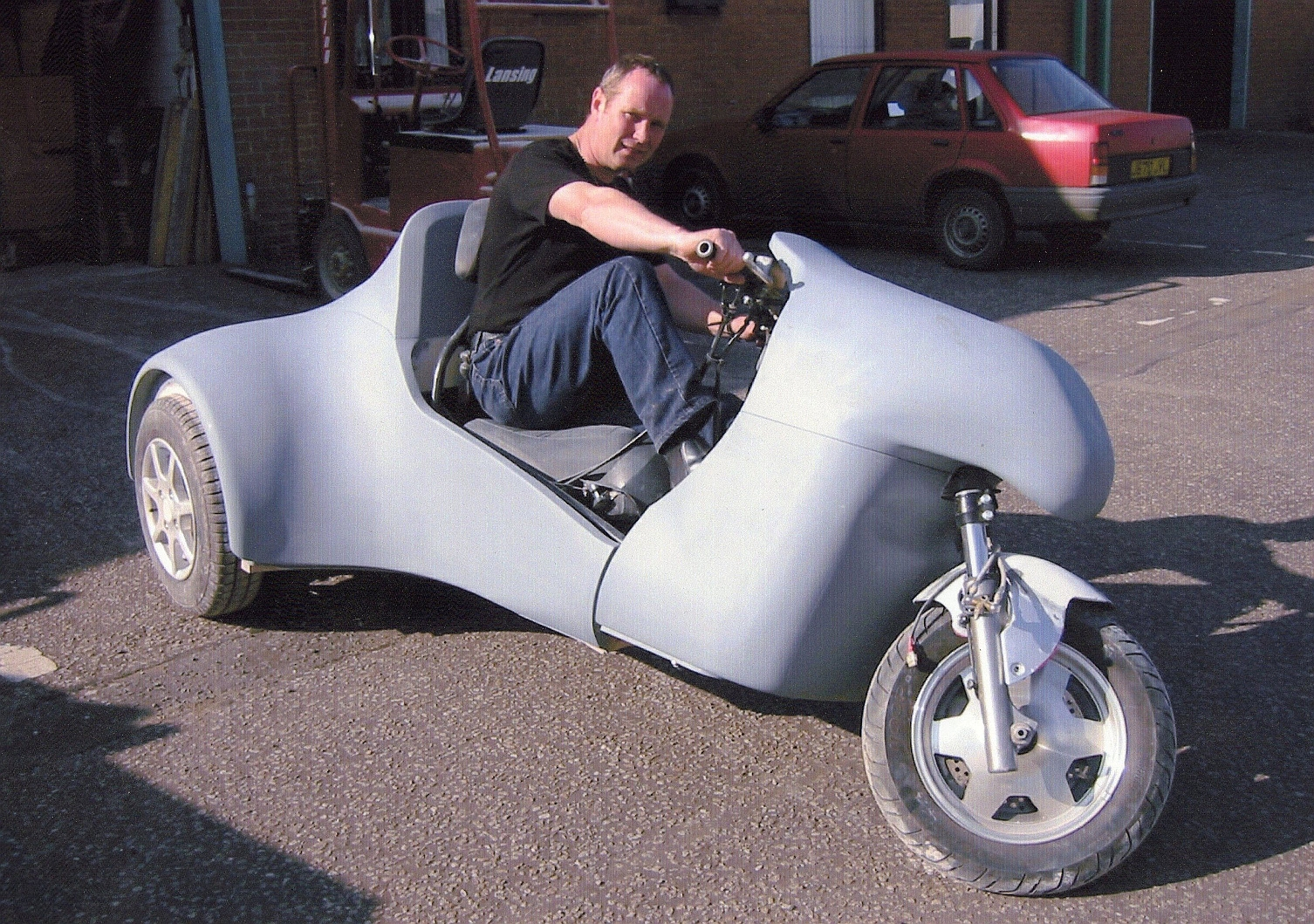
MEV Tilting Trike

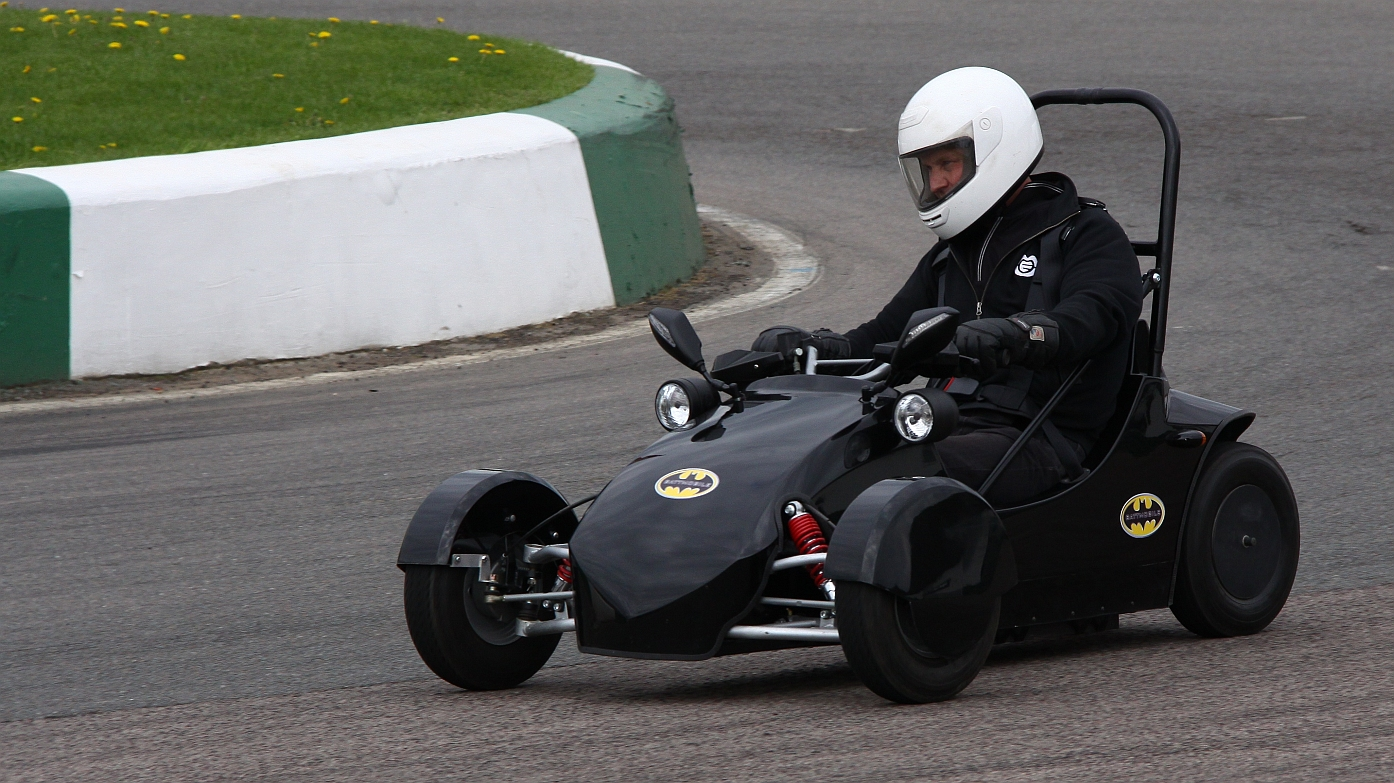
MEV Etrike

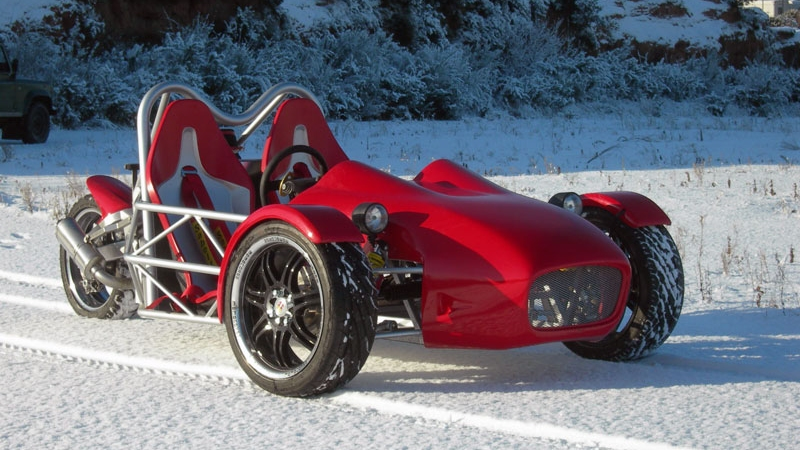
MEV TR1ke

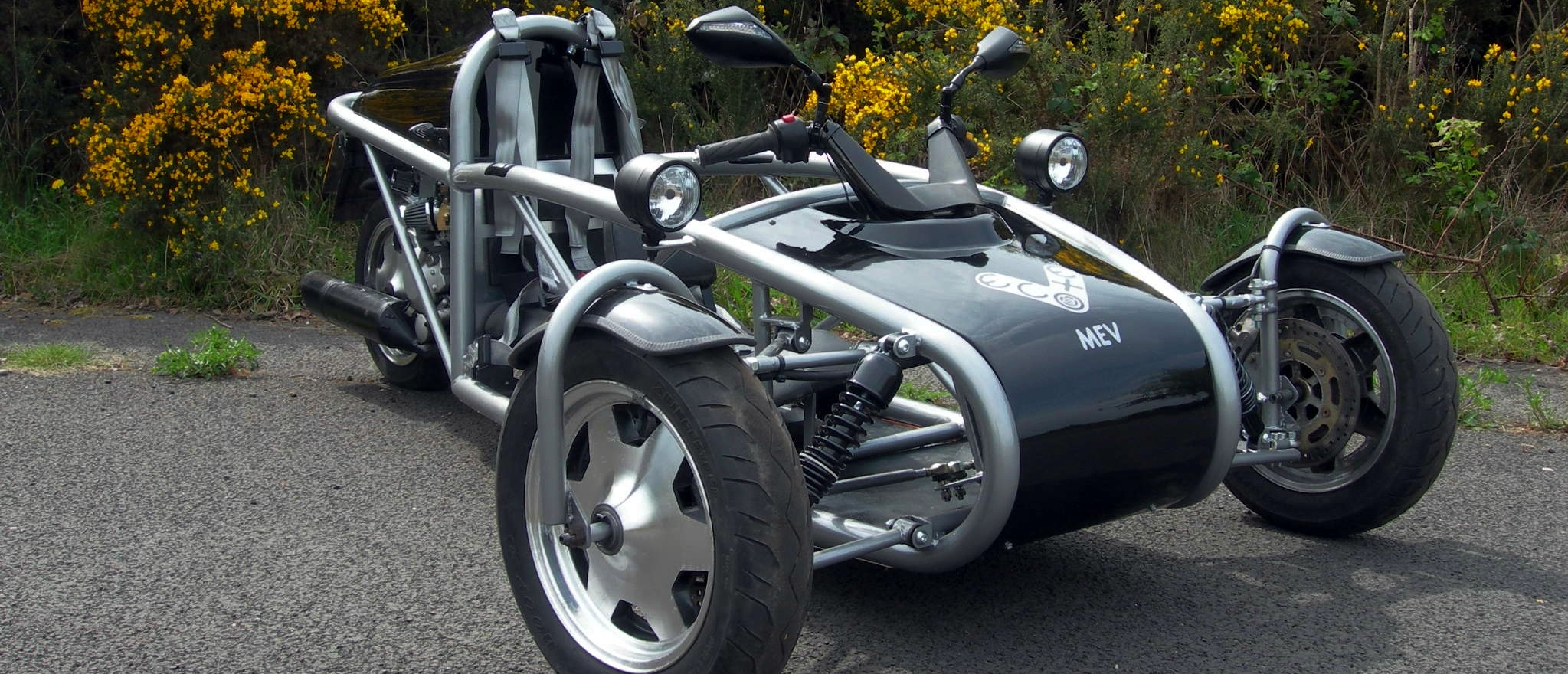
MEV Eco-Exo

=== Tilting trike ===
MEV's first model was a tilting trike, a single seat trike intended for commuter use. The whole front end tilted into the corner; a patent for the mechanism was awarded in 2005, however this model has never been offered commercially.

=== E-trike ===
This is a single seat ultra compact electric commuter trike. It has been available since June 2008; the E-trike is sold as set of plans (including a component list) rather than a kit: the builder fabricates the chassis.

=== tR1ke ===
This bike powered, RWD, two-seater, exoskeletal, reverse trike was introduced in July 2009. It uses the engine, transmission and rear swing-arm from a Yamaha R1 donor.

=== Eco-exo ===
Compact tandem seat RWD commuter exoskeleton reverse trike using major components from a Suzuki Burgman, meaning it can accept powerplants from 125cc to 650cc. Not currently in production in UK.

== Closed Wheel Passenger Vehicles ==
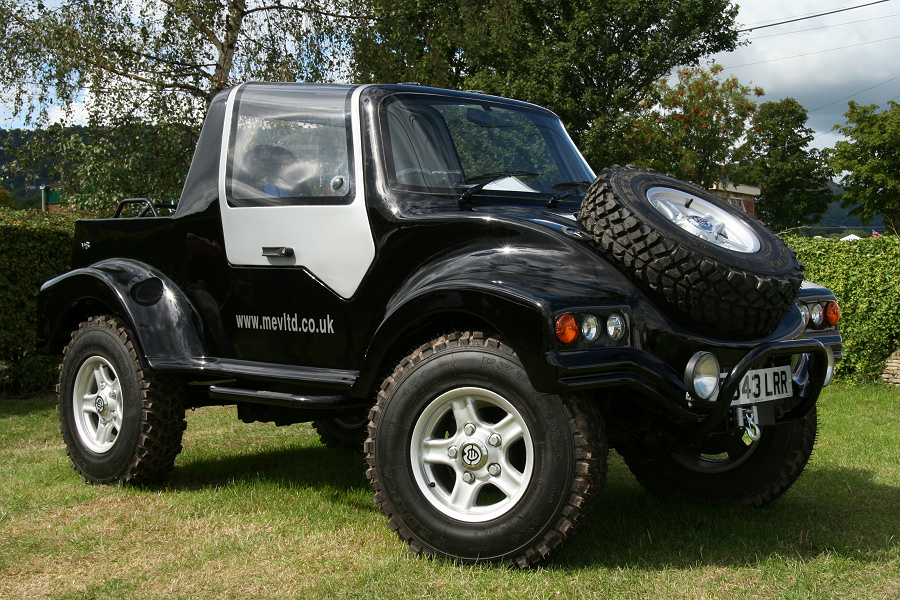
MEV Trek 4x4

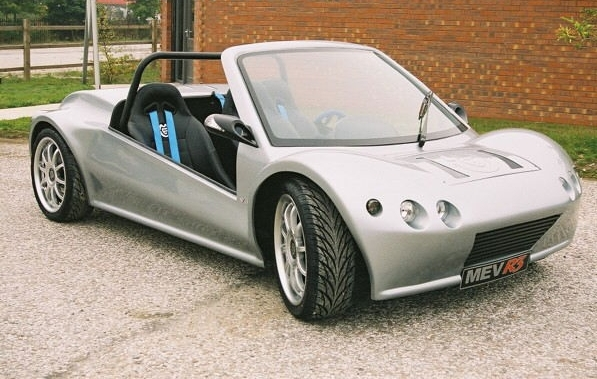
MEV R3

=== Trek 4x4 ===
The Trek 4x4 is a single donor kit based on Range Rover Classic running gear but mounted midships. It was introduced in August 2005 and aimed at the off-road enthusiast, with improved ground clearance, approach, and departure angles, and reduced overall weight compared to donor. As well as being featured in Kit Car (May '06) & Total Kit Car (July '06), it was also featured in Total Off-Road, and sold in the Netherlands in addition to the UK, though production ceased in 2006.

=== R3 ===
The R3, introduced in June 2007, shares the same unconventional seating & mechanical layout combination first seen in the McLaren F1, i.e. three seats with central driver position, mid/rear engine, RWD car. It was powered by a 2.5L Ford Duratek V6 engine. The R3 is no longer in production.

== Open Wheel Performance Vehicles ==
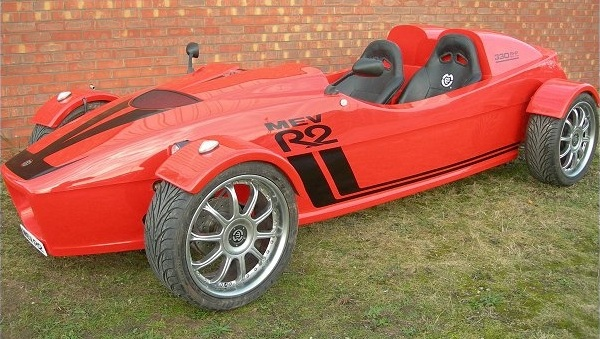
MEV R2

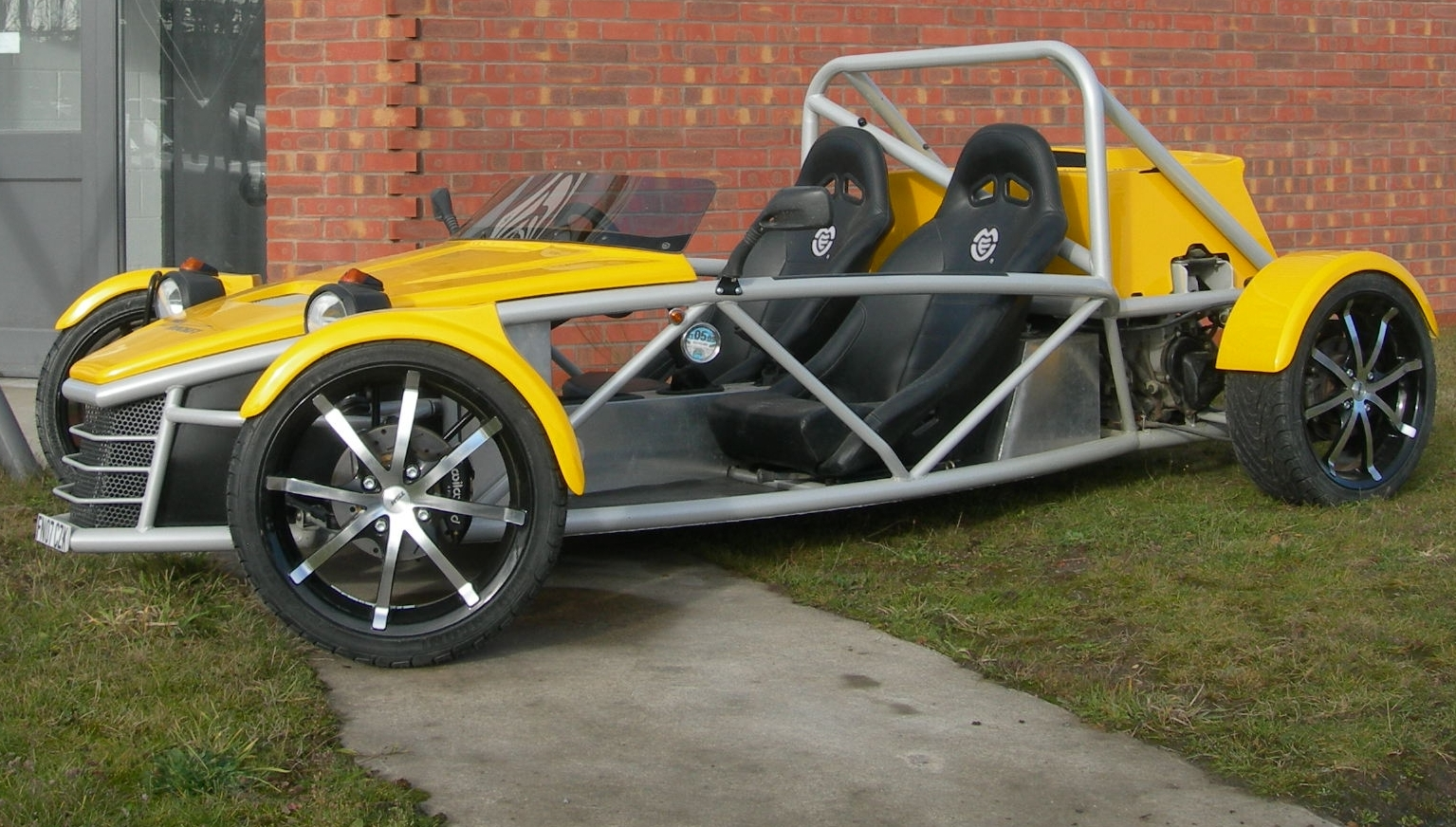
MEV Rocket

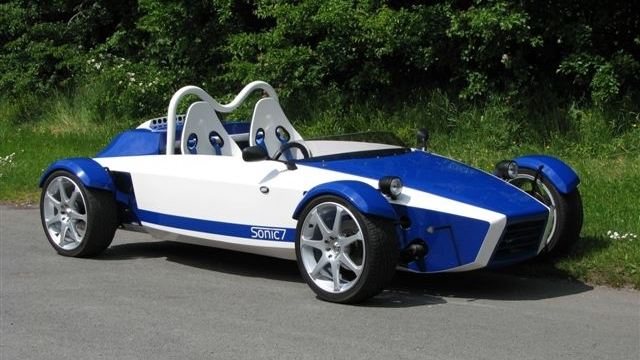
MEV Sonic7

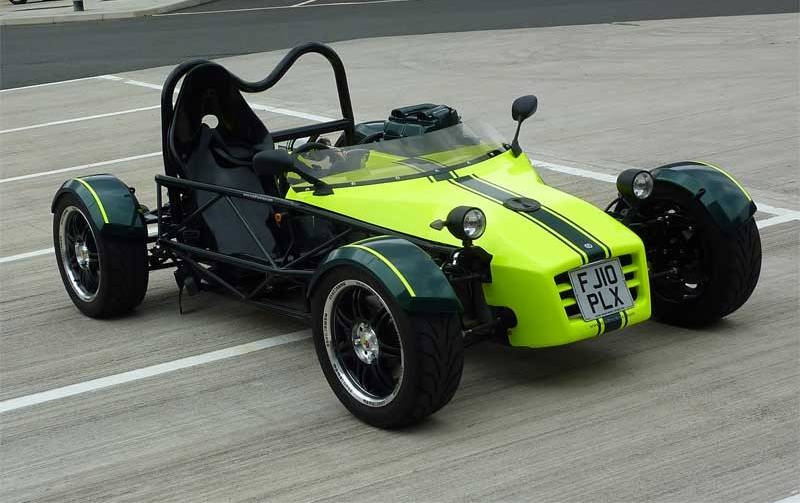
MEV Atomic

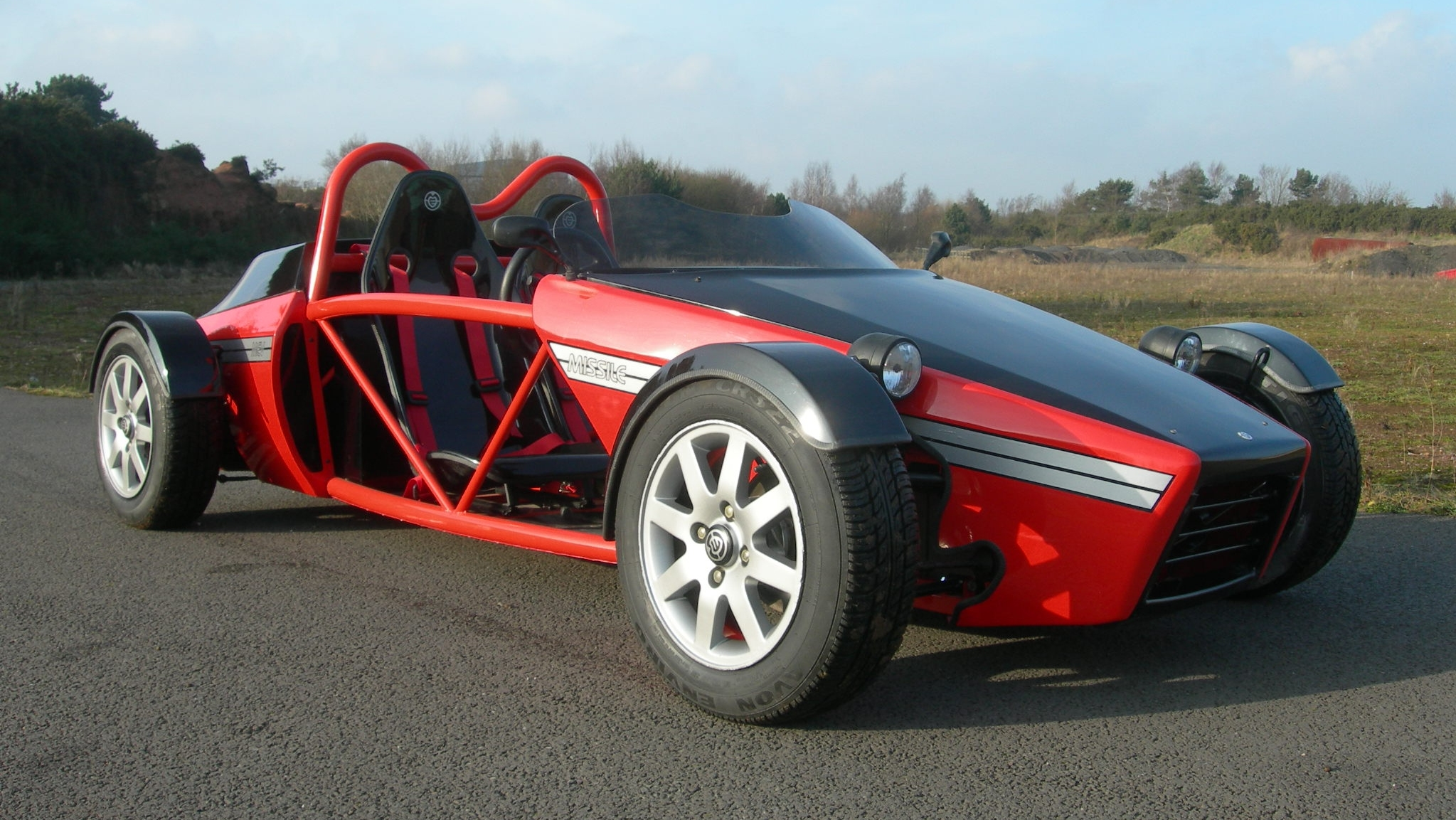
MEV Missile

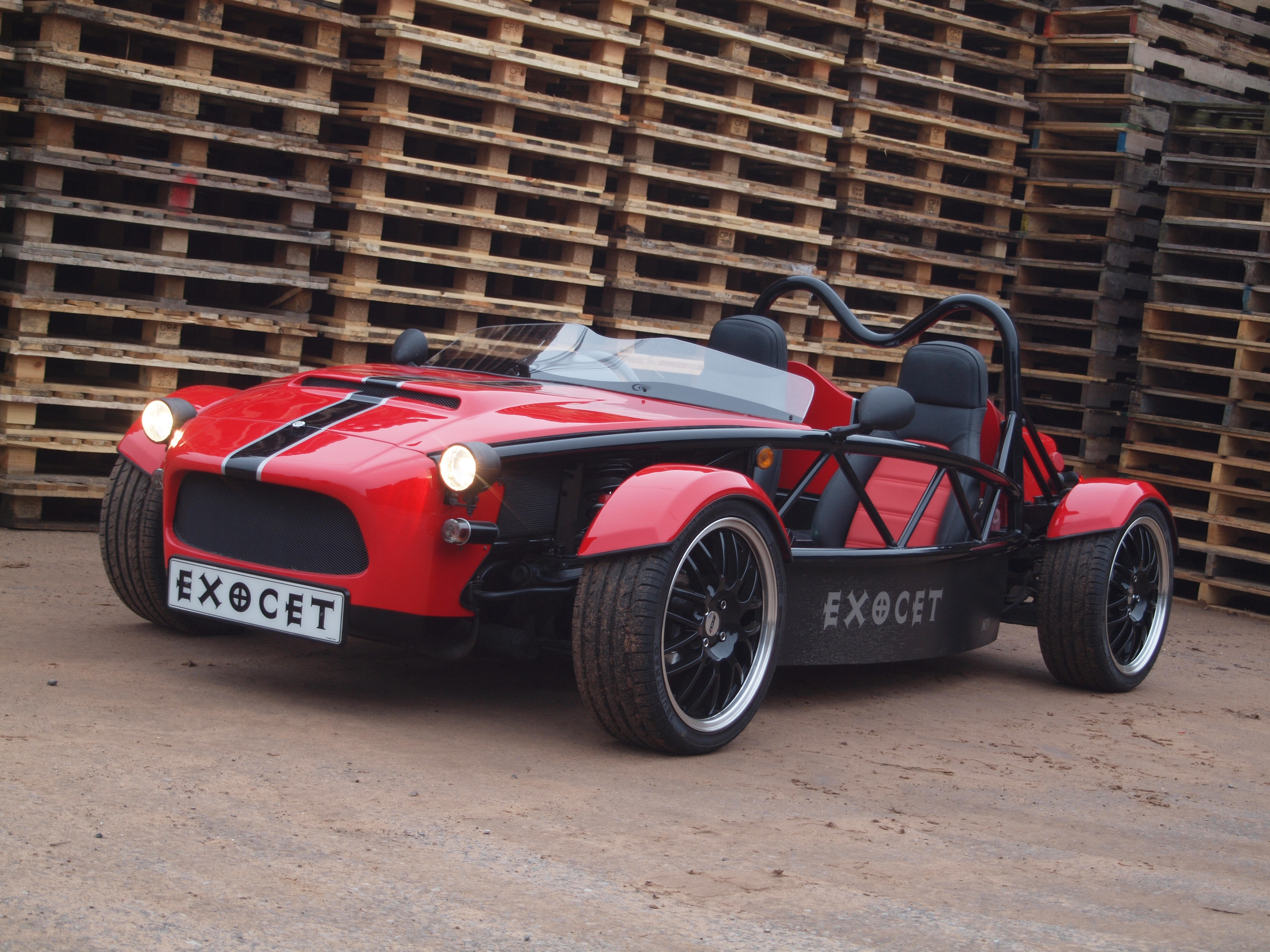
MEV Exocet

=== R2 ===
Electric kit car commissioned as a promotional vehicle by a company to showcase their products as well as challenging pre-conceived notions about electric vehicles, in terms of type and performance. To that end, the R2 (also known as the Electric Sports Car) was an open two-seater with high-performance (4.5 sec 0–60 time was the aim); it made its public debut at The National Kit Car Show at Stoneleigh on 4 May 2008.

=== Rocket ===
The Rocket was introduced in September 2007. It was conceived as a self-build, budget response to the Ariel Atom, which is credited with creating a new genre of sportscar known as 'exoskeleton' or 'exoskeletal' cars. It is a single donor car using Ford Focus Mk.1 components, but converts mechanical layout to mid-rear RWD.

=== Sonic7 ===
Launched in February 2008, The Sonic7 was conceived as more civilized alternative to the Rocket. Though still a roadster (though a windscreen, doors & roof are available as optional extras) it does feature an enclosed cockpit. Design and concept wise, it is very similar to the Rocket mechanically, it uses different, simplified, chassis constructed from straight, box section steel instead of the Rocket's curved, tubular sections.

=== Atomic ===
Single seat side-by-side Bike Engined Car (BEC), introduced June 2009. The mechanical layout is intended to give optimal weight distribution (25% at each wheel) with driver on board. It uses the engine from '98–'06 Yamaha R1 which, combined with its low overall weight of 334 kg, gives a power-to-weight ratio in excess of 400 bhp per ton.

=== Missile ===
The Missile was an electric exoskeletal car, powered by a brushless 3 phase 11 kW motor incorporating regenerative braking; it used eighteen 50Ah lead-acid valve-regulated batteries totalling 12kWh, which can be charged overnight on a high frequency charger. Range is approximately 40 miles, top speed 50 mph and overall weight is 600 kg, including 280 kg of batteries. It is not in production.

== Other Vehicles ==
=== Mevster ===
Demand was noted for a MEV with weather protection so MEV developed the Mevster, a similar concept to the Exocet, but with more bodywork and the option of a roof. However, the demand was low and only 20 units were sold. The kit was withdrawn from the market in 2015.

=== Battmobile ===
First shown in 2014, Battmobile is a trademark registered to Mills Extreme Vehicles Ltd. The electric reverse trike has tandem seats and with its lithium yttrium battery and 3 phase motor it is capable of a 100 miles range.

=== MEV X5 ===
In August 2011, this new Coupe based on a Mazda MX5 was launched at the Newark kit car show.

=== X5 Superlight ===
The X5Superlight, a follow-up in 2012 to the MEVX5, is the MX5 based kit with a lightweight space frame chassis and a roadster body similar to the Mazda Superlight concept car.

=== MEVabusa ===
This was launched at the Stoneleigh kit car show in 2012, fitted with a Suzuki Hayabusa engine, hence the name.

=== Replicar ===
The Replicar, inspired by the 1959 Le Mans 24hr winning Aston Martin DBR1 had a GRP body, triangulated space-frame and used a Mazda MX5 (Mk1/2/2.5) as the donor. The all-up weight was ¾ ton, slightly lighter than the DBR1. A build with a standard 1.8 MX5 Mk2.5 would produce in excess of 200 bhp/ton.

=== Monster ===
The Monster, introduced in 2014 with a Chevy V8. The 2-seat open sports car had a huge power to weight ratio with 400 bhp on tap.

=== Charger ===
2015 saw an electric conversion and re-style of an MBC VW-based kit car. The air-cooled engine and fuel tank were replaced by a larger AC induction motor and Lithium battery pack resulting in a top speed of 80 mph on track.

=== Rocket MkII ===
A revamp of the popular Rocket kit was developed in 2016, featuring a Toyota 1.8 engine with an output of 190 bhp.

=== Exoblade ===
A 2017 concept car based on the Honda Fire Blade engine.
