= CLEVER =

Tilting three-wheeled motor vehicle

The CLEVER (for "compact low emission vehicle for urban transport") is a type of tilting three-wheeled motor vehicle that was developed in a collaboration between the University of Bath, BMW and a number of other partners from across Europe. CLEVER is designed as an alternative to conventional means of personal urban transport. The narrow body endows it with some of the manoeuvrability and congestion avoiding capability of a motorcycle, whilst offering comparable weather and impact protection to a car. Carbon emissions are reduced as a function of low weight and a small frontal area. The narrow track width requires that CLEVER tilts into corners to maintain stability; thus it is fitted with a Direct Tilt Control (DTC) system that uses hydraulic actuators linking the cabin to the non-tilting rear engine module.

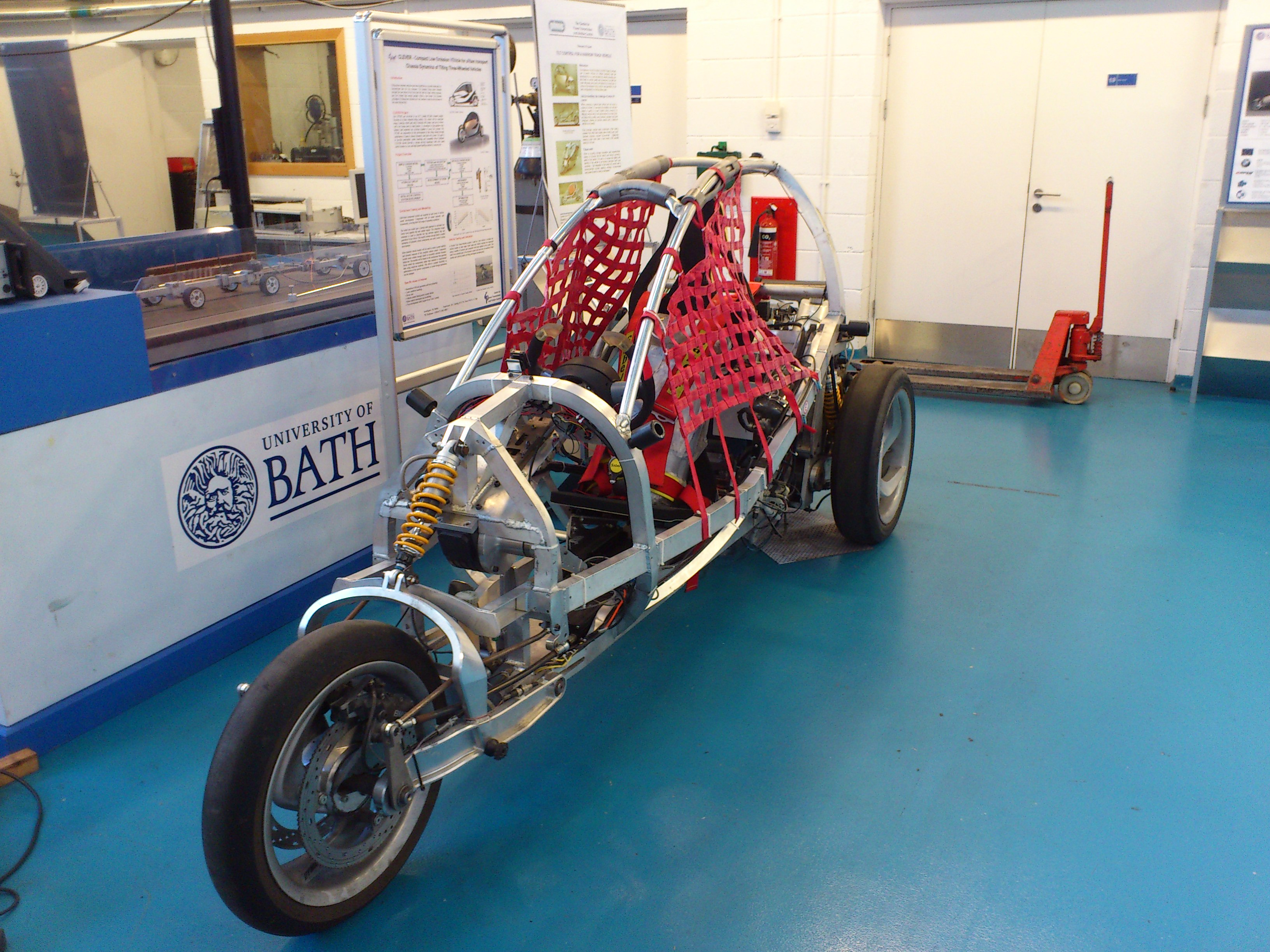
The CLEVER Vehicle Prototype without bodywork, June 2013.

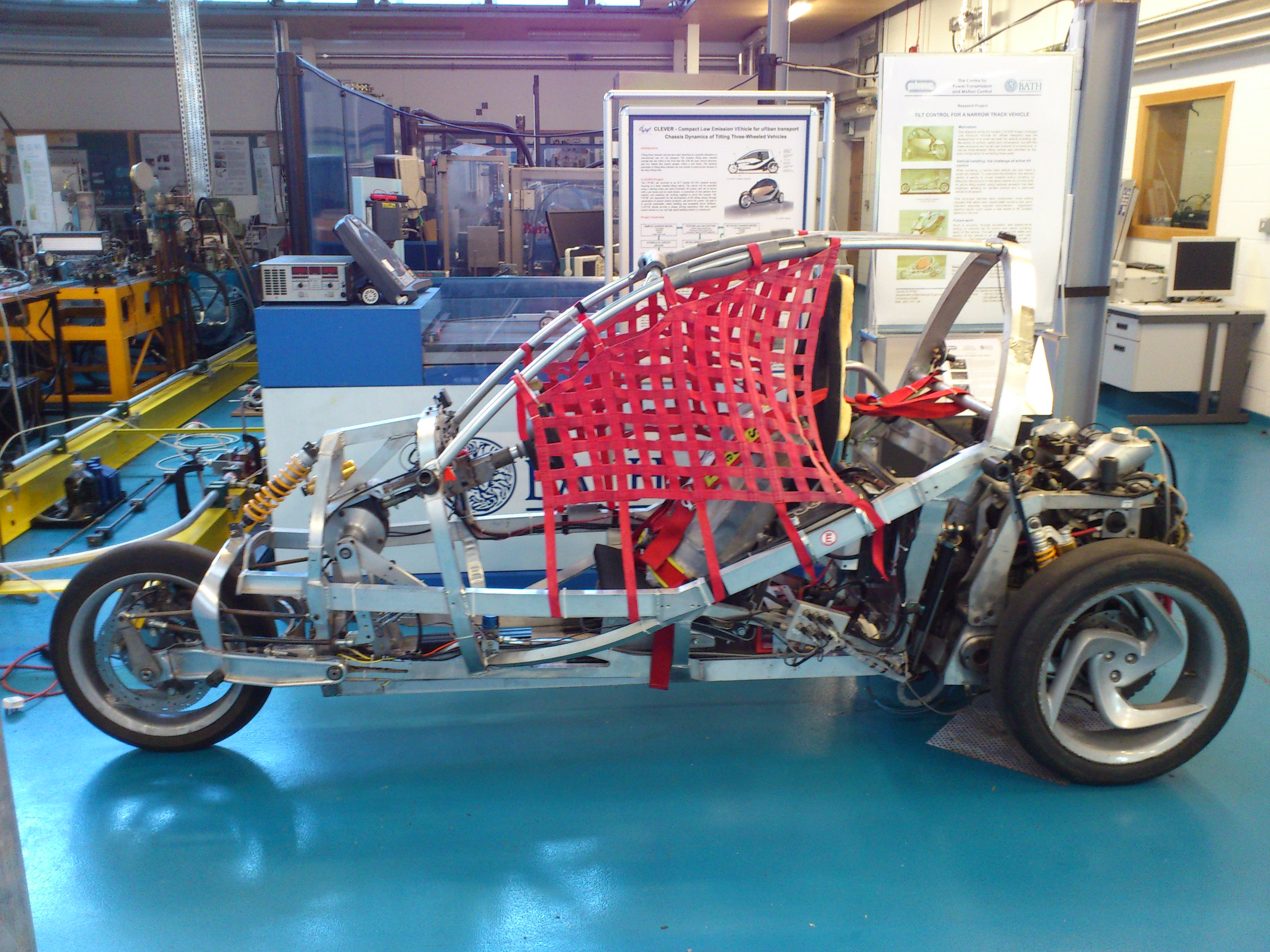
Side View of the CLEVER Vehicle Prototype without bodywork, June 2013. Note the miniature hydraulic actuator (partially obscured by the cabin frame) and the intermediate steering arm used in the active steering system.

CLEVER measures only one metre (3 ft 3 in) wide and has a maximum speed of approximately 60 mph (97 km/h). It runs on compressed natural gas, achieving a predicted 108 mpg_{‑imp} (2.6 L/100 km; 90 mpg_{‑US}) per gallon fuel efficiency. Construction of the first of five prototype vehicles was completed on Friday, April 21, 2006. Shortly after construction, track testing of a prototype vehicle revealed that, in certain transient situations, the DTC system could not guarantee stability of the vehicle. As of December 2012, research into alternative tilt control strategies for the CLEVER vehicle is still on-going at the University of Bath.

== Vehicle configuration ==
CLEVER features a two-seat tandem layout, a single front wheel, tilting cabin, and a two-wheeled rear engine module. The total vehicle mass is approximately 332 kg (excluding driver and bodywork); with a 75 kg driver the static weight distribution is 39% front and 61% rear. The rear module does not tilt and accounts for approximately 40% of the laden vehicle mass meaning only 60% can be tilted to balance the vehicle whilst cornering. CLEVER's wheelbase is 2.4m, as long as many conventional city cars, but there are no overhangs so total length is under 3m. The track width is just 0.84m giving a total vehicle width of 1.00m.

Whilst the Clever vehicle was intended to use a low emission engine burning compresses natural gas, the research prototype at the University of Bath uses a 13 kW 176cc single cylinder engine taken from BMW C1 scooter. The original CVT gearbox is retained (albeit modified to provide a power take off to drive the pump for the tilt hydraulics); belt drives are used to transmit power to the two rear wheels. Rear suspension is by way of independent trailing arms, adjustable Öhlins spring/damper units and an anti-roll bar. The front wheel is suspended by a leading four bar linkage with a single Öhlins spring/damper unit and uses a hub-centric steering system. A single track-rod transmits steer inputs to the front wheel from the output arm of a worm-gear steering box, the driver's steer inputs are transmitted to the steering box via a modified wheel and column sourced from a BMW car.

== Tilting system ==
CLEVER employs an electronically controlled and hydraulically actuated Direct Tilt Control system with a maximum tilt angle of ±45° [6]. A pair of single acting hydraulic actuators generate a tilting moment about the tilt bearing (which joins the cabin and rear module). The tilt controller uses driver's steer input and the vehicle's speed to estimate the lateral acceleration and hence the appropriate tilt angle. The DTC system provides excellent stability at low speeds but during vigorous manoeuvres at higher speeds the system's torque output exceeds that which can be reacted by the non-tilting rear module; as a result the inside rear wheel lifts, this can lead to the vehicle rolling over.

To improve the roll stability in transient conditions, the prototype CLEVER vehicle was fitted with an active steering system in 2012; this allowed the use of a combined Steering Direct Tilt Control (SDTC) strategy. The active steering system output is a function of the vehicle's tilt angle error (the difference between the actual and ideal tilt angle), therefore at steady state when there is little or no tilt angle error the front wheel steer angle matches the driver's steer demand. However, in transient situations, such as upon turn-in, a tilt angle error exists and the active steering system acts to reduce or eliminate the driver's steering input. In extreme conditions it will also initiate a countersteering action whereby the front wheel momentarily steers in the opposite direction to that intended by the driver. As the cabin approaches the desired tilt angle, the magnitude of the tilt angle error is reduced and the front wheel steer angle takes on the value demanded by the driver.

By reducing the severity of the driver's steer inputs, or indeed initiating countersteer, the active steering system delays the onset of lateral acceleration and reduces the moment necessary for the DTC actuators to tilt the cabin of the vehicle into the corner. This reduced tilting moment benefits both vehicle stability and energy consumption. Simulation results show a significant reduction in load transfer across the rear axle. In 2014 experimental results were published showing a 40% reduction in the load transfer across the rear axle during a severe ramp steer manoeuvre conducted at 10 m/s and showing that the combined SDTC strategy became more effective at higher speeds . In the same article, it is noted that the whilst the driver of a SDTC equipped vehicle is subject to an additional under-steer sensation during harsh transient manoeuvres, this does not inhibit his/her ability to control the vehicle's trajectory.

== Safety ==
In crash tests conducted, it received a USNCAP 3-star safety rating (at 56 km/h).

The head and chest stresses on the driver were very good, and the head stresses on the passenger were also acceptable as a result of the energy-absorbing foam on the driver's backrest.

The intrusion in the driver’s footwell was very low and posed no threat to the driver’s extremities. The vehicle cell suffered deformation in the forecast area, the driver’s door could be opened without any problems after the crash. The front wheel swinging arm collapsed and came loose because, to save time and money, a welded aluminum construction was used rather than a cast construction. This problem will not occur on the standard solution.

== See also ==
- Carver (automobile)
