= Tilting three-wheeler =

Tilting three-wheeled vehicle

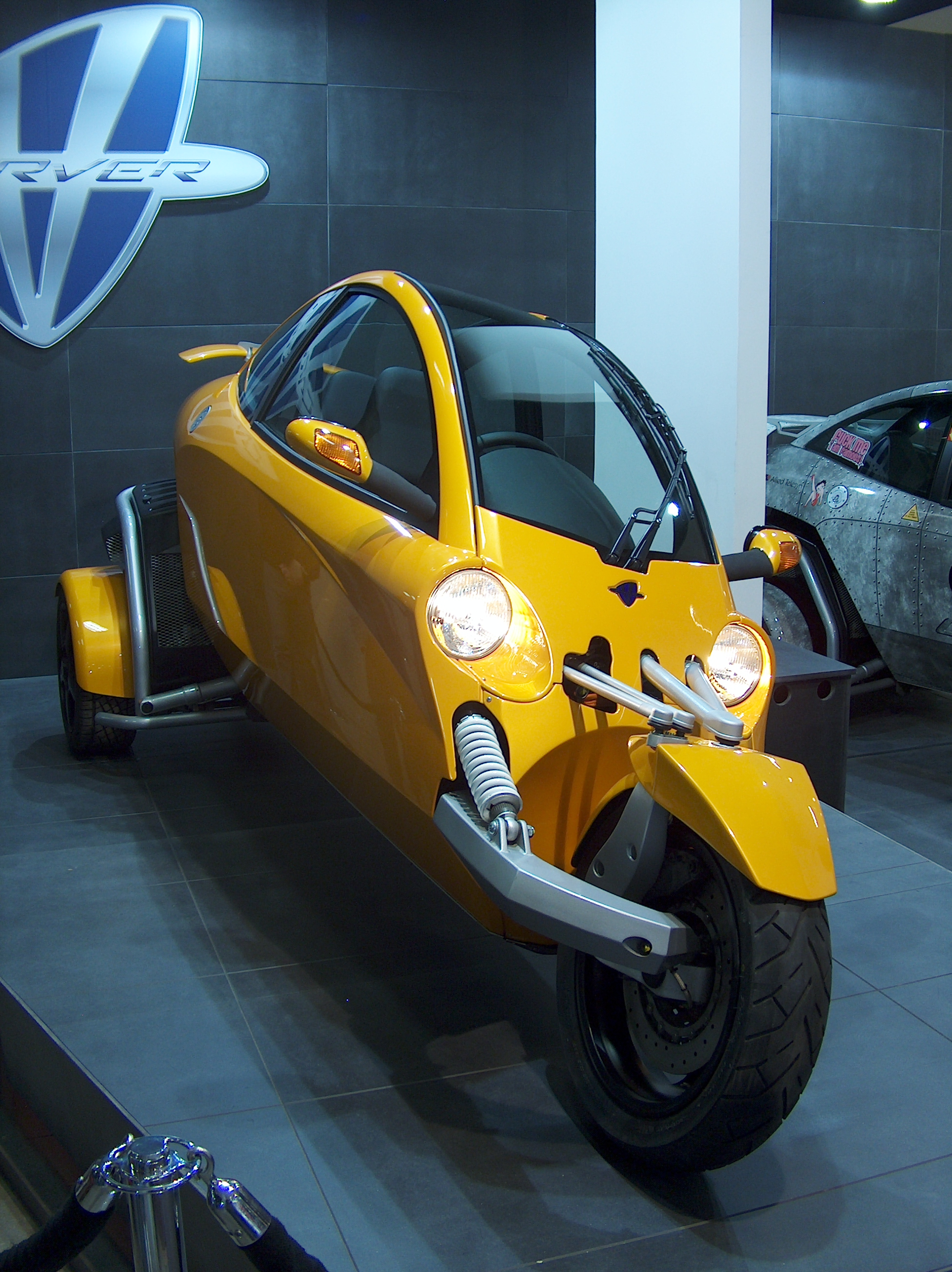
Vandenbrink Carver (1F1T)

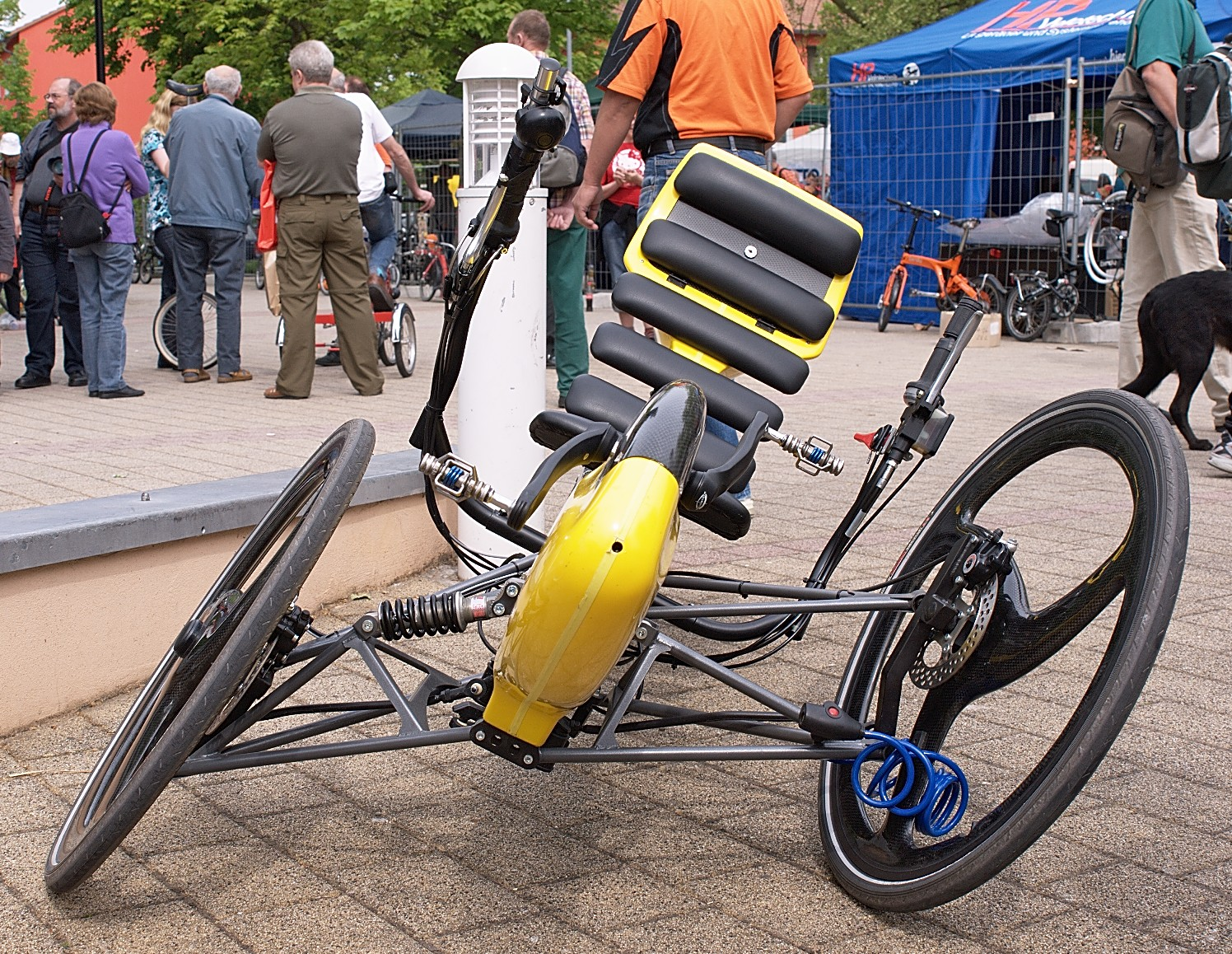
Tripendo recumbent tricycle, a tilting three-wheeler (2F3T)

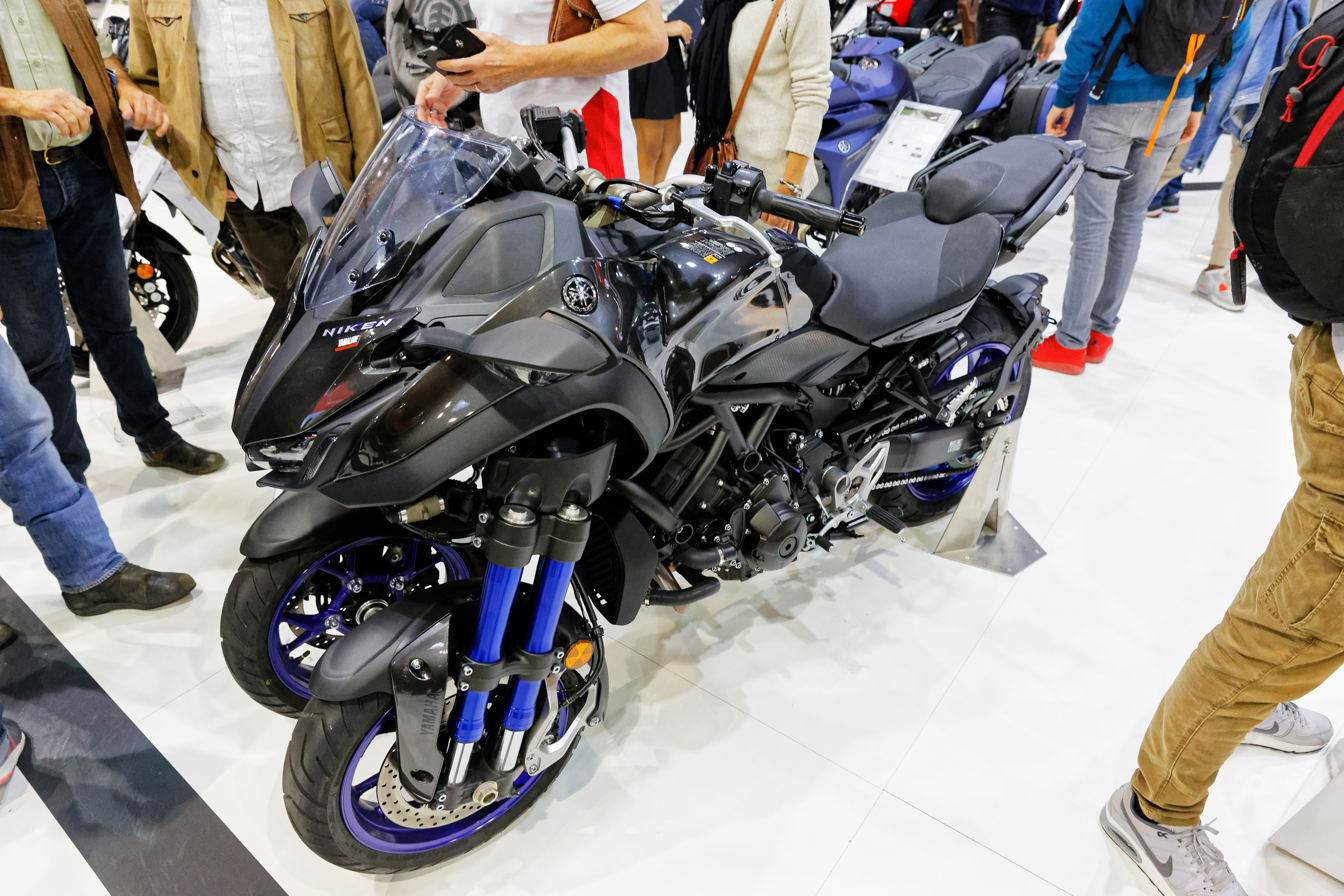
Yamaha Niken from 2018

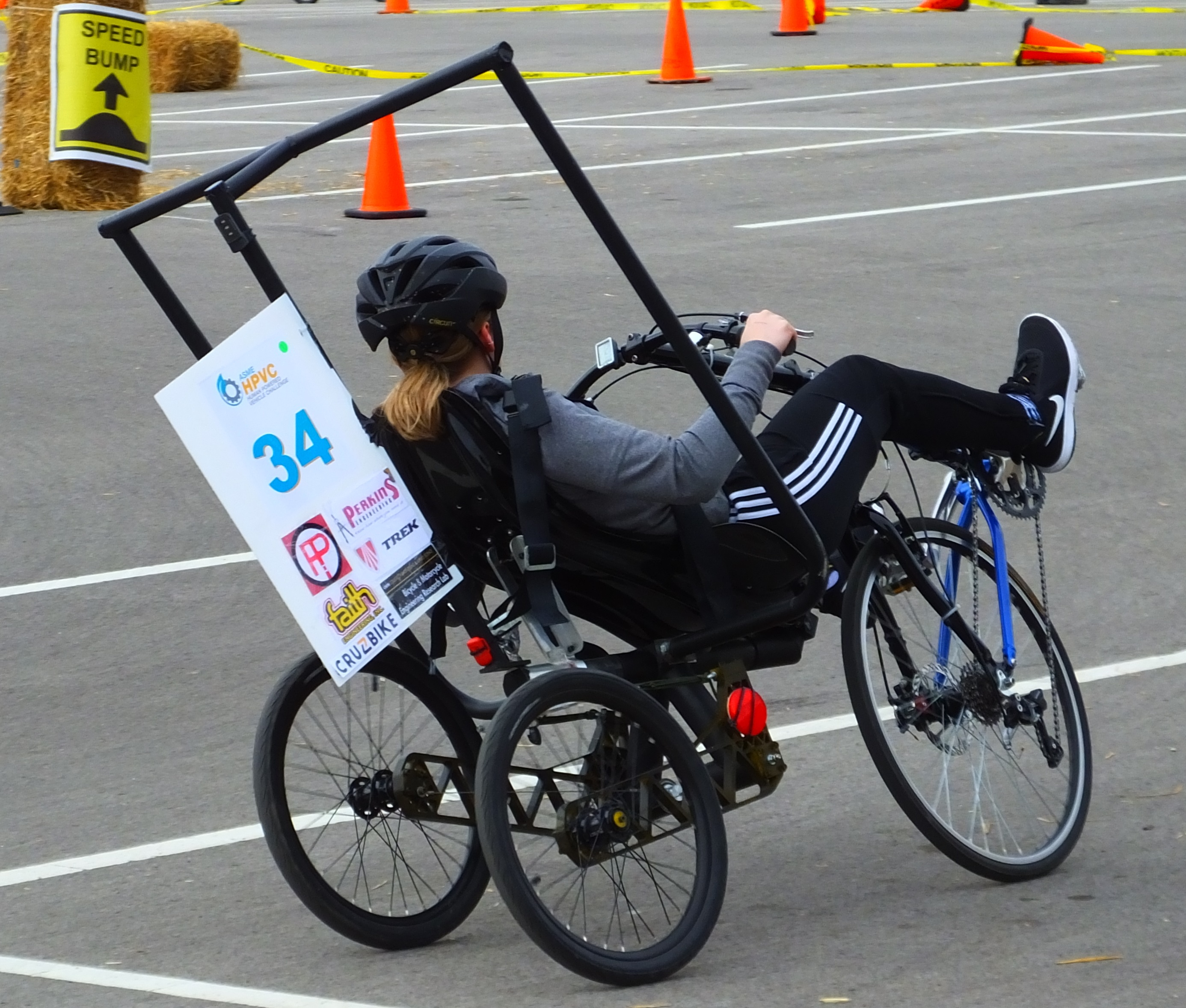
UWM PantherTrike, a narrow-track, tilting, recumbent, human-powered trike (1F3T)

A tilting three-wheeler, tilting trike, leaning trike, or even just tilter, is a three-wheeled vehicle and usually a narrow-track vehicle whose body and or wheels tilt in the direction of a turn. Such vehicles can corner without rolling over despite having a narrow axle track because they can balance some or all of the roll moment caused by centripetal acceleration with an opposite roll moment caused by gravity, as bicycles and motorcycles do. This also reduces the lateral acceleration experienced by the rider, which some find more comfortable than the alternative. The narrow profile can result in reduced aerodynamic drag and increased fuel efficiency. These types of vehicles have also been described as "man-wide vehicles" (MWV).

As with tricycles that do not tilt, there are a variety of feasible choices of how the wheels are arranged, which wheels are steered, and which wheels are driven. In addition, there are a variety of feasible choices for which wheels tilt and which do not.

== Terminology ==
This is an emerging field with various vehicle configurations, different contributors, and evolving technology, so there potentially confusing terminology in use:

- tilt, lean, and roll are all used somewhat interchangeably, depending on the context and the writer, usually to mean rotation about a longitudinal axis of the vehicle.
- stable and stability are usually used in this context to characterize whether the vehicle tilts, leans, or rolls as the rider wishes. As with directional stability, a vehicle is considered stable about its longitudinal axis if it returns to the vertical/ straight orientation hands free, and unstable if it does not. The stability of a vehicle may vary with its forward speed, and the stability might be inherent in the vehicle or created by the rider or some other active controller. For example, bicycles exhibit no stability when stationary, they simply fall over, but can exhibit self-stability if rolling forward at the right speed, even without a rider. Meanwhile, active tilters exhibit roll stability at all times and are designed not to rollover in a turn. Tilting vehicles may exhibit nearly any combination of the above behaviors, due to any combination of their geometry, mass distribution, suspension characteristics, rider input, or some other active control system.
- active, passive, and free usually refer to how the tilt angle is controlled, directly or indirectly. "Active" control usually requires some sensor(s), some capacity to calculate a response, such as a feedback controller, and some actuator(s) that require power sources. "Passive" control and "free" control mean there are no sensors, comparisons, response calculation, or actuators and the vehicle is controlled as a bicycle or motorcycle "Free" and "passive" usually mean that the vehicle tilts as a bicycle or motorcycle, and the rider must control the tilt angle indirectly by steering the vehicle.
- direct and indirect usually refer to how active control is applied. The rider on a "free-tilting" and "passive-tilting" trike usually can apply a steer torque directly, which then controls the tilt angle indirectly, as on bicycles and motorcycles. The rider on a "free-to-caster" trike, on the other hand, can apply a roll torque directly, which then controls the steer angle indirectly.
- highside and lowside are expressions already commonly used in the motorcycle world to describe ways in which the bodies of these vehicles may collide with the ground.

== Benefits and drawbacks ==
The potential benefits of tilting, compared to the rigid alternative, include:

- The ability to balance the moment caused by lateral acceleration in a turn, due to high speed, tight radius, or both, with a counter moment caused by gravity, means these vehicles do not have to be low, wide, and/or slow. Also, since stability no longer depends on the axle track, the center of mass does not have to be located near the wide axle and instead can be located anywhere between the front and rear axle to optimize other performance characteristics such as ride quality or braking performance.
- Leaning into a turn, as bicycles and motorcycles do, means that the net acceleration experienced by the vehicle and rider can always be aligned with the midplane of the vehicle. Riders may find this more pleasant than the alternative, and vehicle components, such as the frame, wheels, and tires, can avoid large side loads.
- A narrow axle track means that the vehicle does not require as much pavement and may experience less aerodynamic drag because of a smaller cross-sectional area.
- Depending on how the tilting is implemented, a tilting vehicle can be oriented independent of cross slope, such as from the crown in a road or a soft shoulder.

The drawbacks of tilting, compared to the rigid alternative, include:

- The tilting mechanism, free or controlled, requires more constructive elements compared to two-wheeled (motor-) cycles, while independent suspension of rigid three-wheelers may be more complex
- Control of the tilting either requires some kind of automated control system or different behavior from the rider, such as countersteering.

== Configurations ==
=== Wheel layout ===
As with tricycles in general, the two main wheel layouts are:

- delta, with one wheel in front and two wheels in back. Notable examples include the Ariel 3, MEV Tilting Trike, Honda Canopy, Vandenbrink Carver, and CLEVER.
- tadpole, with two wheels in front and one wheel in back. Notable examples include the Piaggio MP3, Yamaha Tricity, and Toyota i-Road.

Twinned Wheel Rule: In many countries aligned to EU regulations an arrangement of two wheels on the same axle is treated as one wheel provided they are spaced no further apart than 460 mm (18 in) between contact patch centers. This has the effect of allowing vehicles complying with this dimensional limit to be classified as motorcycles. Therefore, such vehicles would be subject to all the technical prescriptions applicable to motorcycles rather than motorised tricycles or four-wheeled vehicles.

=== Steered wheels ===
Rear-wheel steering tends to be directionally unstable, and so the vast majority of trikes employ front-wheel steering. A notable exception is the Toyota i-Road. In the case of two wheel steering, some accommodation is usually made to account for the different radii of their paths, such as Ackermann steering geometry.

=== Driven wheels ===
Either the front or rear wheel(s) may be driven, but driving a wheel near its power source is usually simpler than driving a wheel at the other end of the vehicle, driving a single wheel is usually simpler than driving a pair of wheels, and driving a wheel that remains aligned with its power source is simpler than driving a wheel that tilts or steers relative to its power source. Two common drive configurations are:

- Drive two non-tilting wheels in the rear. Notable examples include the Ariel 3, MEV Tilting Trike, Honda Canopy, Vandenbrink Carver, and CLEVER.
- Drive one tilting wheel in the rear. Notable examples include the Piaggio MP3, Yamaha Tricity, and Toyota i-Road.

Less common drive configurations include:

- Drive two tilting wheels in the rear.
- Drive one tilting wheel in the front. One example is the Rose-Hulman Ragnarök pictured below.

=== Seating ===
As with tricycles in general, seating may be upright, as on the Piaggio MP3, or recumbent, as on the MEV Tilting Trike. If the vehicle is designed to accommodate a second rider, the seating is usually arranged in tandem to maintain the narrow profile, as on the CLEVER.

=== Enclosure ===
The rider may be fully exposed, as on the Tripendo, behind a fairing or windscreen, as on the Piaggio MP3, under a canopy, as on the Honda Canopy, or fully enclosed, as on the Vandenbrink Carver.

=== Power ===
Power may come from the rider, as on the Tripendo, from batteries and electric motors, as on the Toyota i-Road, or from conventional internal combustion engines, as on the Yamaha Tricity.

== Tilting ==
Any number of the wheels can tilt, and advantages to tilting wheels are that the wheels do not need to bear large side loads, and the tires mounted on them can generate camber thrust, which can reduce the need for a slip angle to generate cornering force. Configurations include:

- One wheel in front and only the front tilts, referred to as 1F1T (i.e. one front one tilts). Notable examples include the Ariel 3, MEV Tilting Trike, Honda Canopy, Vandenbrink Carver, and CLEVER.
- One wheel in front and all three wheels tilt, referred to as 1F3T (i.e. one front three tilt). An example can be seen in the Rose-Hulman Ragnarök pictured below and the UWM PantherTrike pictured above.
- Two wheels in front and only the single rear wheel tilts, referred to as 2F1T (i.e. two front one tilt).
- Two wheels in front and all three wheels tilt, referred to as 2F3T (i.e. two front three tilt). Notable examples include the Piaggio MP3, Yamaha Tricity, and Toyota i-Road.

In the case where the two side-by-side wheels tilt, some mechanical linkage is necessary to coordinate their tilting. Implementations include:

- Some form of one or more parallelograms, such as on the Tripendo pictured above and the Mercedes-Benz F300 Life Jet Concept Vehicle pictured below. This has been employed on tadpole and delta trike configurations.
- Some form a pair of swingarms, possibly connected by some form of bell crank. This tends to be employed on delta trike configurations.
- Some form of crank, in which case the two wheels are not directly side-by-side. This tends to be employed on delta trike configurations.
- Some form of coordination between parallel telescopic forks, as on the Yamaha MWT-9 pictured above and the Yamaha Niken pictured below.

Due to the tilting, there is not necessarily any side-to-side load transfer between the wheels in cornering, so the rule of thumb about tadpoles understeering and deltas oversteering does not necessarily apply. If the tilting mechanism has some limitation on tilt angle, then the lateral acceleration the vehicle can experience without rolling over will be a function of maximum tilt angle possible, axle track, and center of mass location.

=== Free, passive, or active tilt control ===
- Free tilting and passive tilting vehicles are controlled as with a bicycle or motorcycle, in which case countersteering is required. Actively controlled tilters are where the rider or some other controller actively sets the tilt angle directly. Vehicles for which the rider has direct control over the tilt angle include the General Motors Lean Machine, in which the rider controlled tilt with foot pedals, and the Tripendo, in which the rider controls tilt by hand with a lever. An active controller may calculate a desired tilt angle from some combination of lateral acceleration and steering input, and it may set a desired tilt angle with some combination of mechanical, electrical, or hydraulic actuators.
- Free-tilting/passive-tilting vehicles possess no stability about their roll axis when stationary. To remedy this problem some free/passive tilters use tilt locks or restraints when at low speeds. Some use a brake applied to the tilting mechanism, some use progressive roll stability adjustments. Free/passive tilters possess self stability when moving forward with sufficient traction, as with bicycles and motorcycles, and if traction is lost the vehicle will likely lowside. The lateral spacing of the wheels does not avoid tipping over, these vehicles behave and are controlled like single track vehicles.
- Active-tilt vehicles are designed to possess roll stability at all times when stopped or in motion, and if traction is lost, the vehicles will not lowside. In these vehicles the lateral spacing of the wheel set is put to effective use to create additional stability.

In all cases, the tilting mechanism may simply be lockable to facilitate keeping the vehicle upright when stopped or parked. Also, passive or active tilting systems cannot simply counter the roll moment caused by gravity, as this has been shown to make a vehicle practically unsteerable, although there is ongoing debate about whether it is truly unsteerable or not.

=== Enclosures ===
Enclosures can protect rider(s) from the weather and allow for reduced aerodynamic drag.

- Unenclosed vehicles may employ free or passive tilt control because the rider can still put a foot down when stopped. The rider is responsible for controlling tilt just as they would on a two-wheeled bicycle or motorcycle.
- Enclosed vehicles, in which the rider cannot reach the ground, must provide come kind of active tilt control, either automatic or by the rider, to keep the vehicle upright when stopped.

== Steering ==
Steering requires that the axle(s) of the front wheel(s) form a finite angle with the axle(s) of the rear wheel(s), i.e. not be parallel. This misalignment may be accomplished in a variety of ways, and usually the front wheel(s) rotate about a steering axis relative to the rest of the vehicle and the rear wheel(s). One notable exception, already mentioned above, is the rear-wheel-steered Toyota i-Road.

=== Countersteering ===
Some Tilting trikes are forced-tilted, such as the Carver, where the countersteering is not controlled by the operator. Some versions of the model introduced automatic countersteer to increase tilt speed and reduce the force required to tilt the vehicle. Other forced-tilted vehicles may incorporate automatic countersteering. A prototype tilting multi-track free leaning vehicle was developed in 1984 that employs automatic countersteering and does not require any balancing skills.

A larger range of tilting three-wheelers has appeared in the recent years and use manually controlled countersteering like a motorbike, such as the Piaggio MP3 or Yamaha Niken.

=== Free to castor ===
One vehicle variation is to control the steered wheel(s) indirectly by tilting them, along with the vehicle body, and this system is known as free to castor [FTC]. The directional control of a FTC wheel is not particularly strong, as demonstrated by the wheels on a shopping cart, and the castored wheel(s) will turn due to any applied side loading. If the steering axis is not vertical, however, the directional stability above about 10 mph (16 km/h) is very strongly controlled by the dynamic forces. If the castored wheel is attached to the front of a narrow tilting vehicle the castor will automatically place itself on the correct steer angle for the tilt and the speed of the vehicle. A system can be used below 10 mph (16 km/h) to improve slow-speed performance where the steerable wheel(s) are progressively captured to the vehicle tilt action as vehicle speed decreases.

== Examples ==
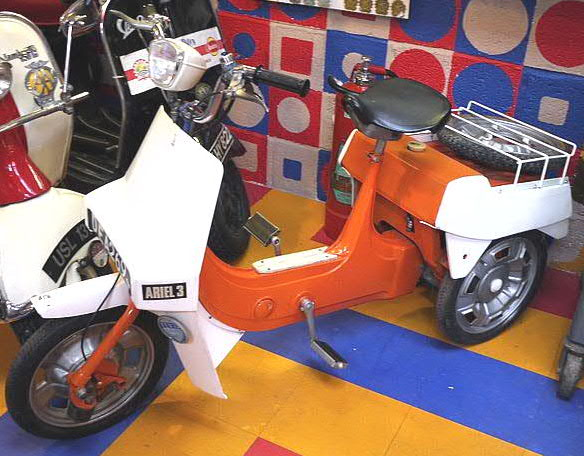
Ariel 3 from 1970. (1F1T)

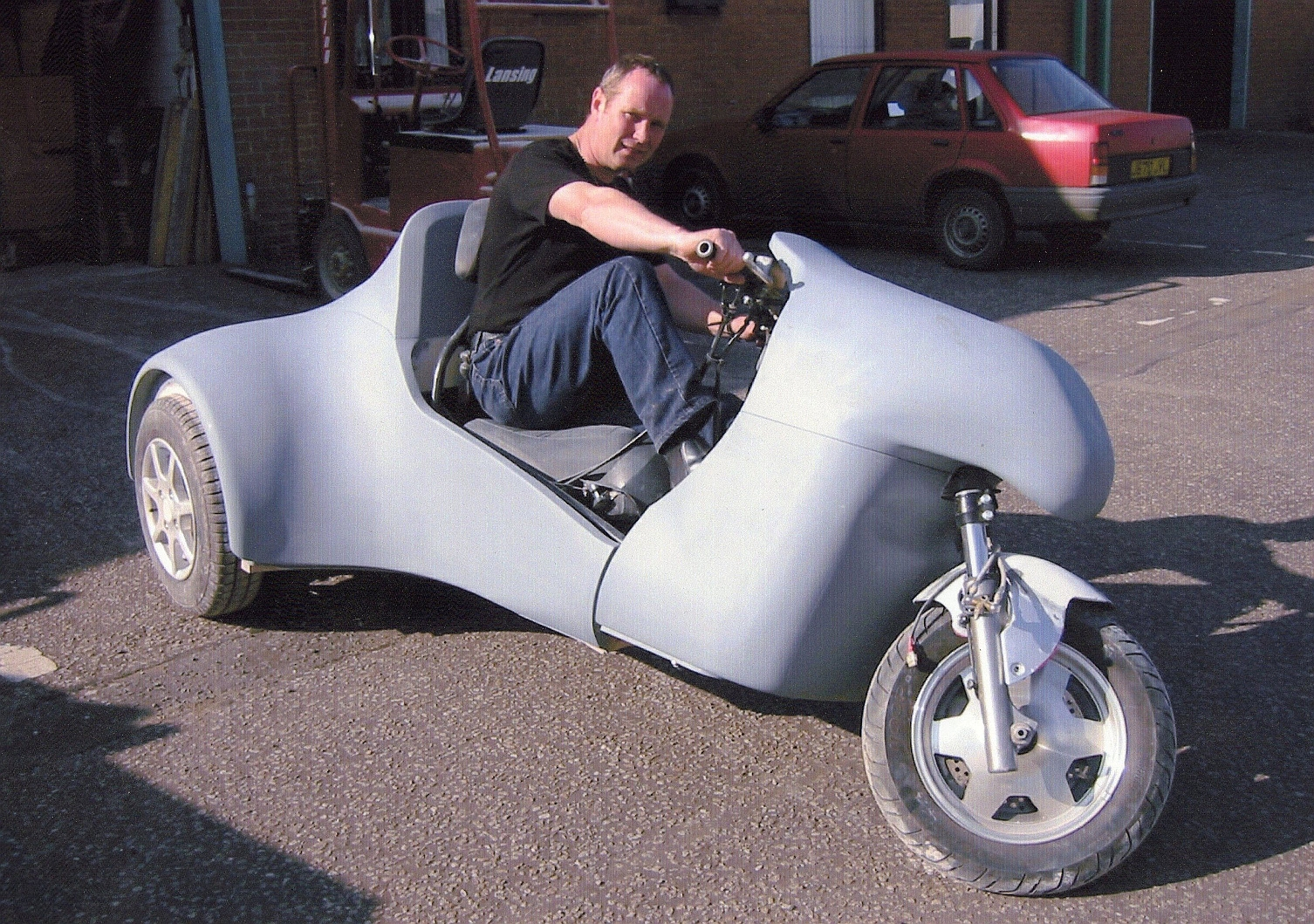
MEV Tilting Trike, patented in 2005. (1F1T)

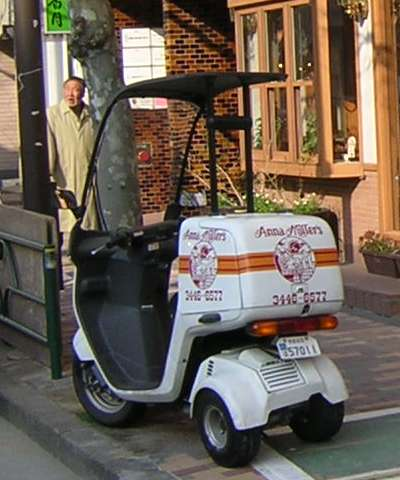
Honda Canopy used for delivery service (1F1T)

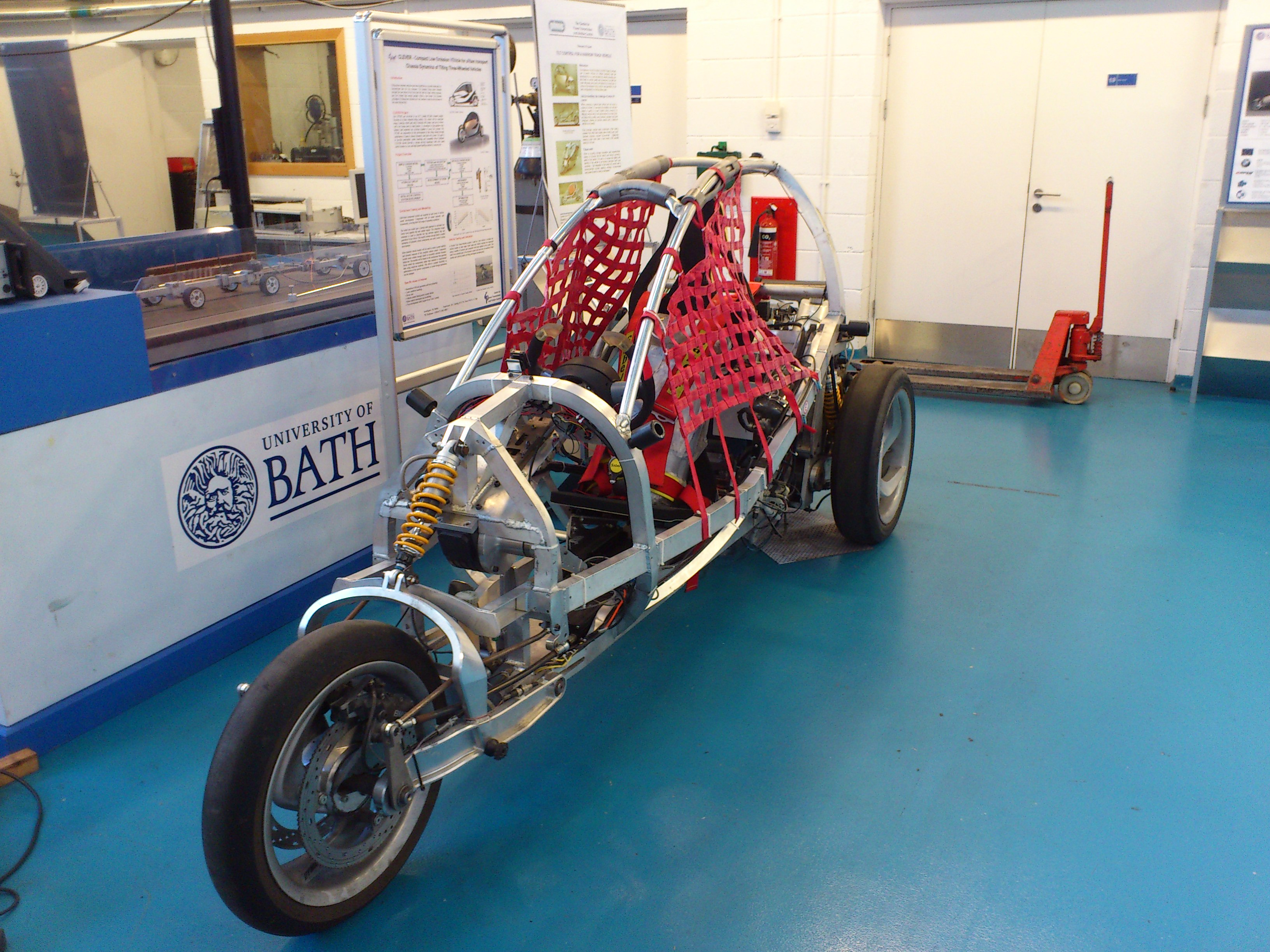
CLEVER prototype without bodywork, June 2013. (1F1T)

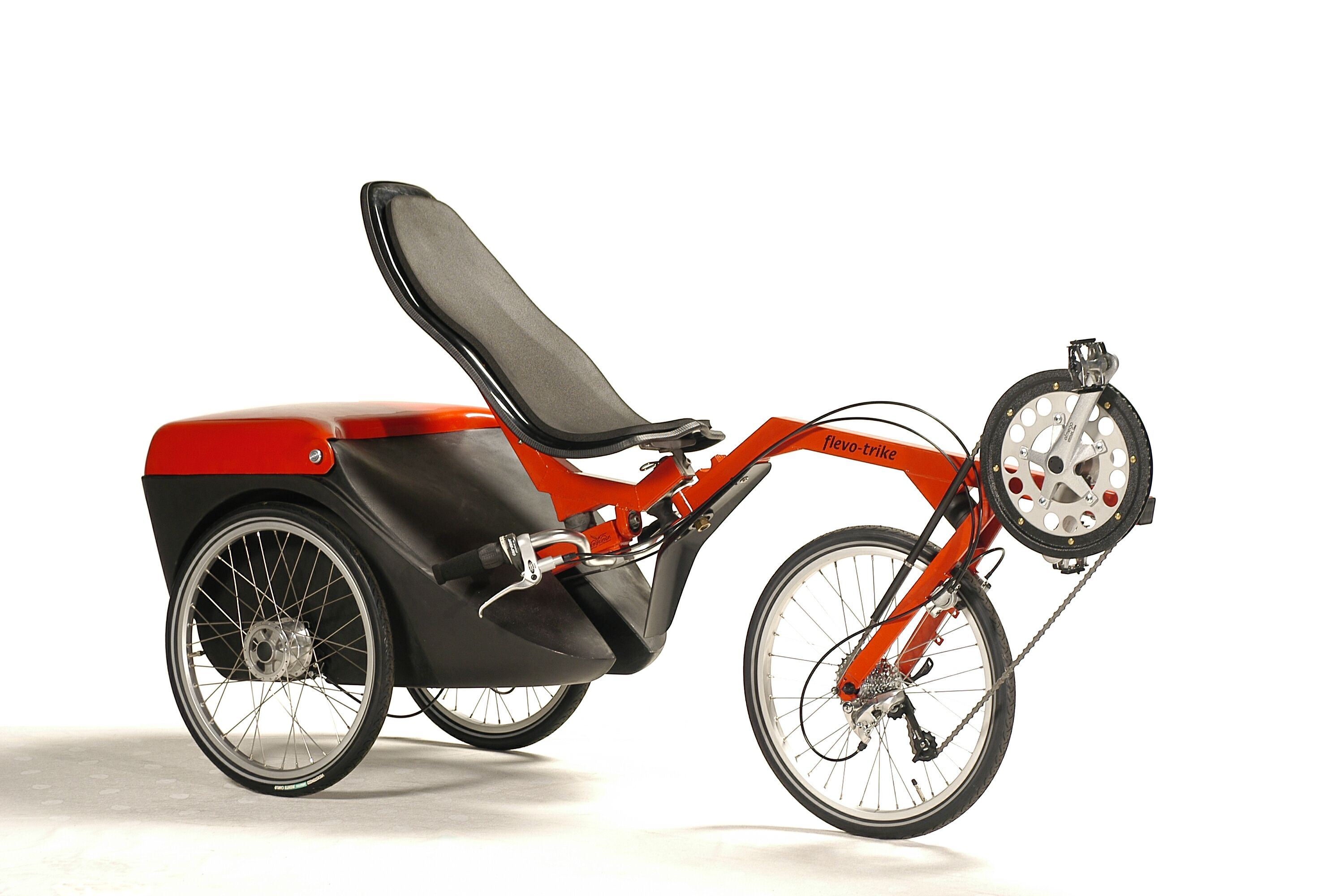
Flevotrike (1F1T)

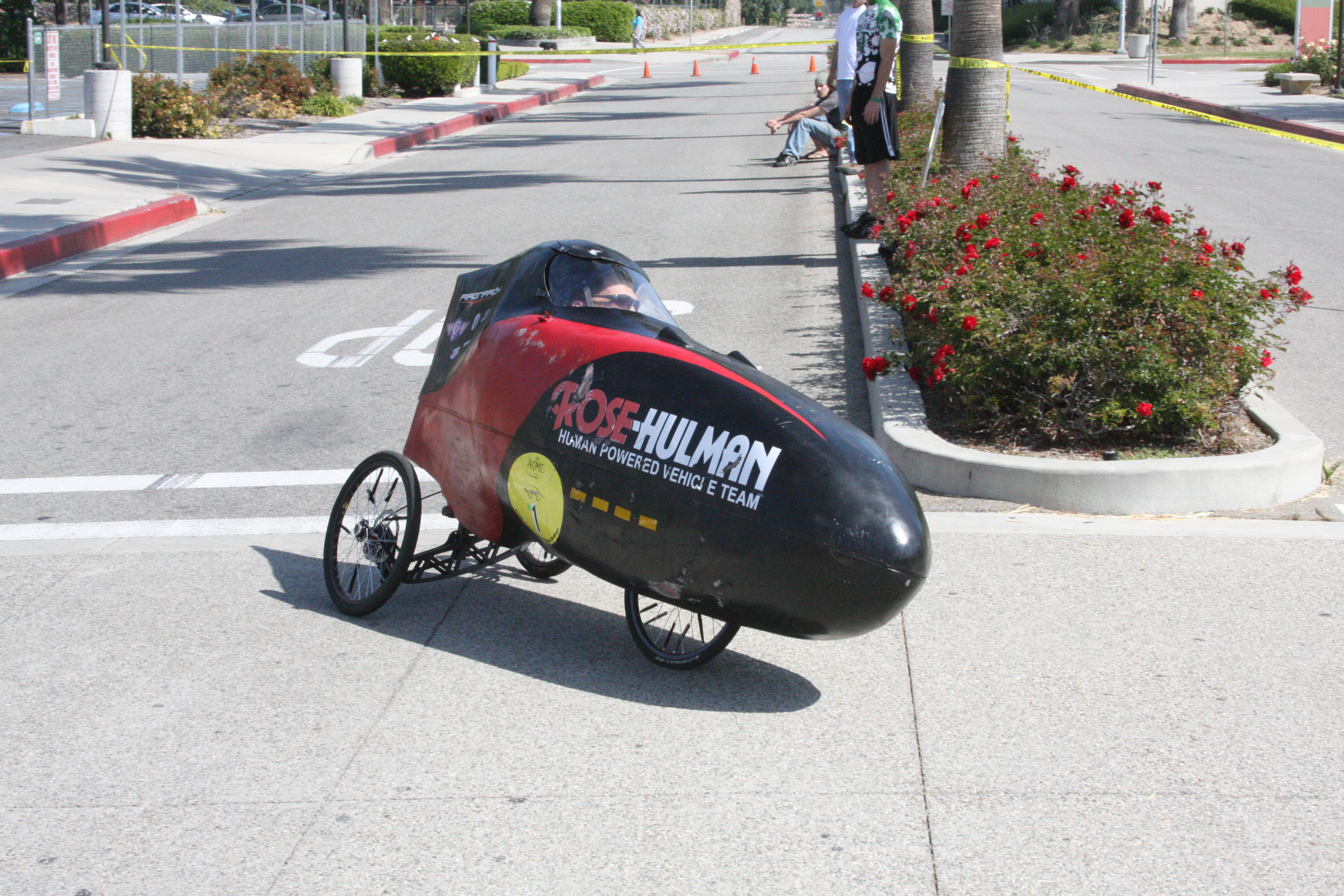
Rose-Hulman Ragnarök (1F3T)

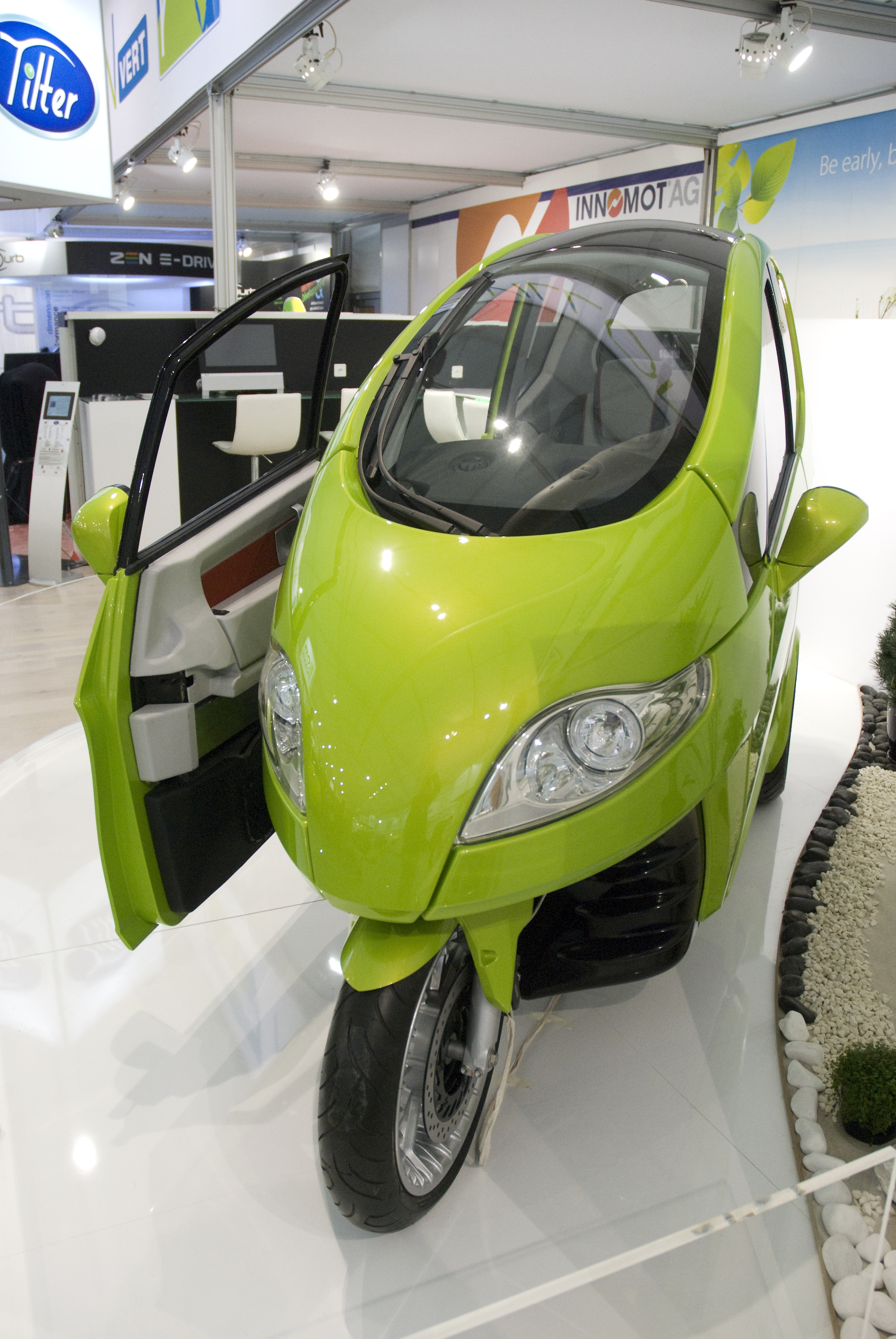
SynergEthic Tilter (1F3T)

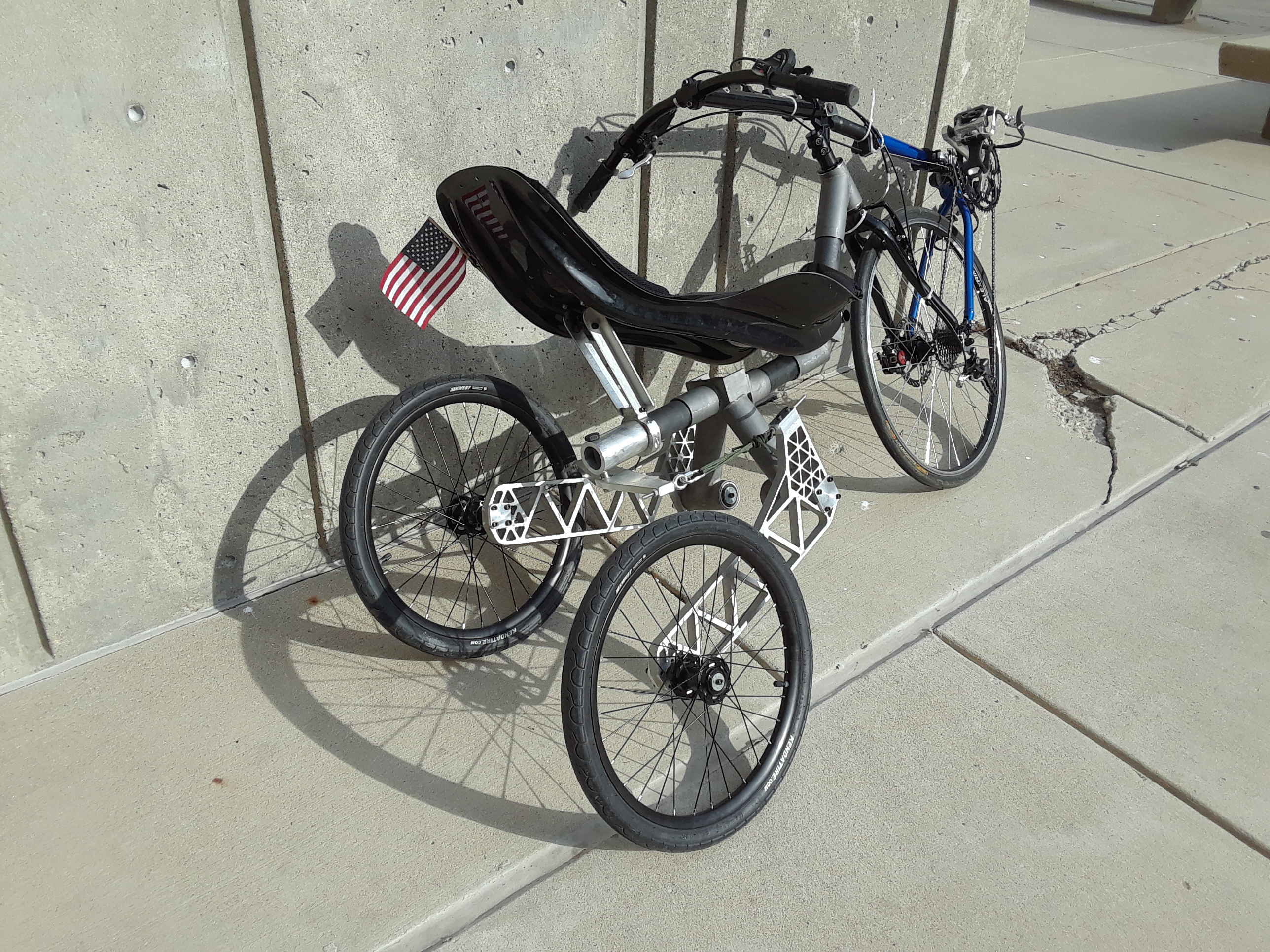
University of Wisconsin-Milwaukee narrow-track, tilting, recumbent trike (1F3T)

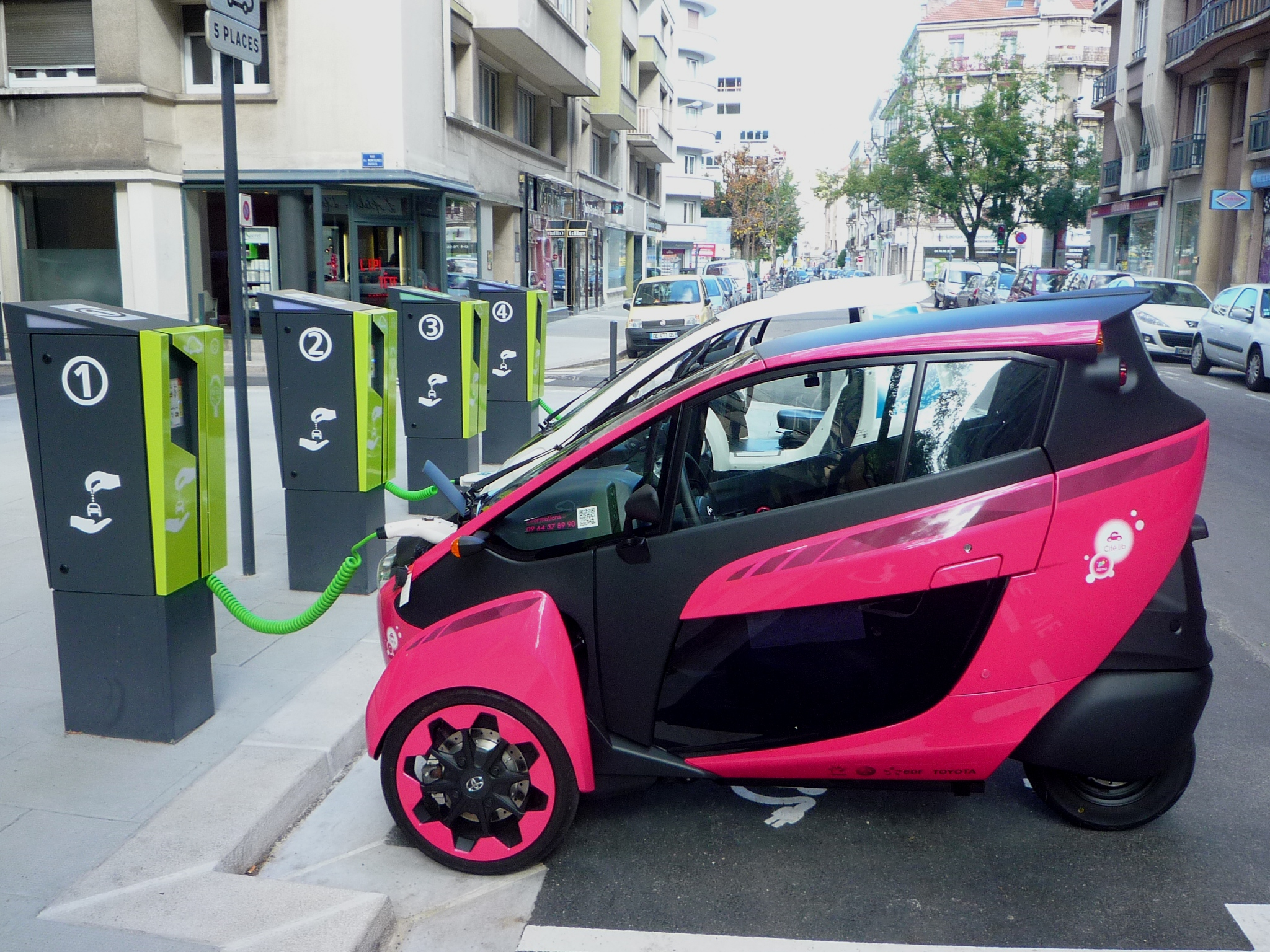
Toyota i-Road (2F3T)

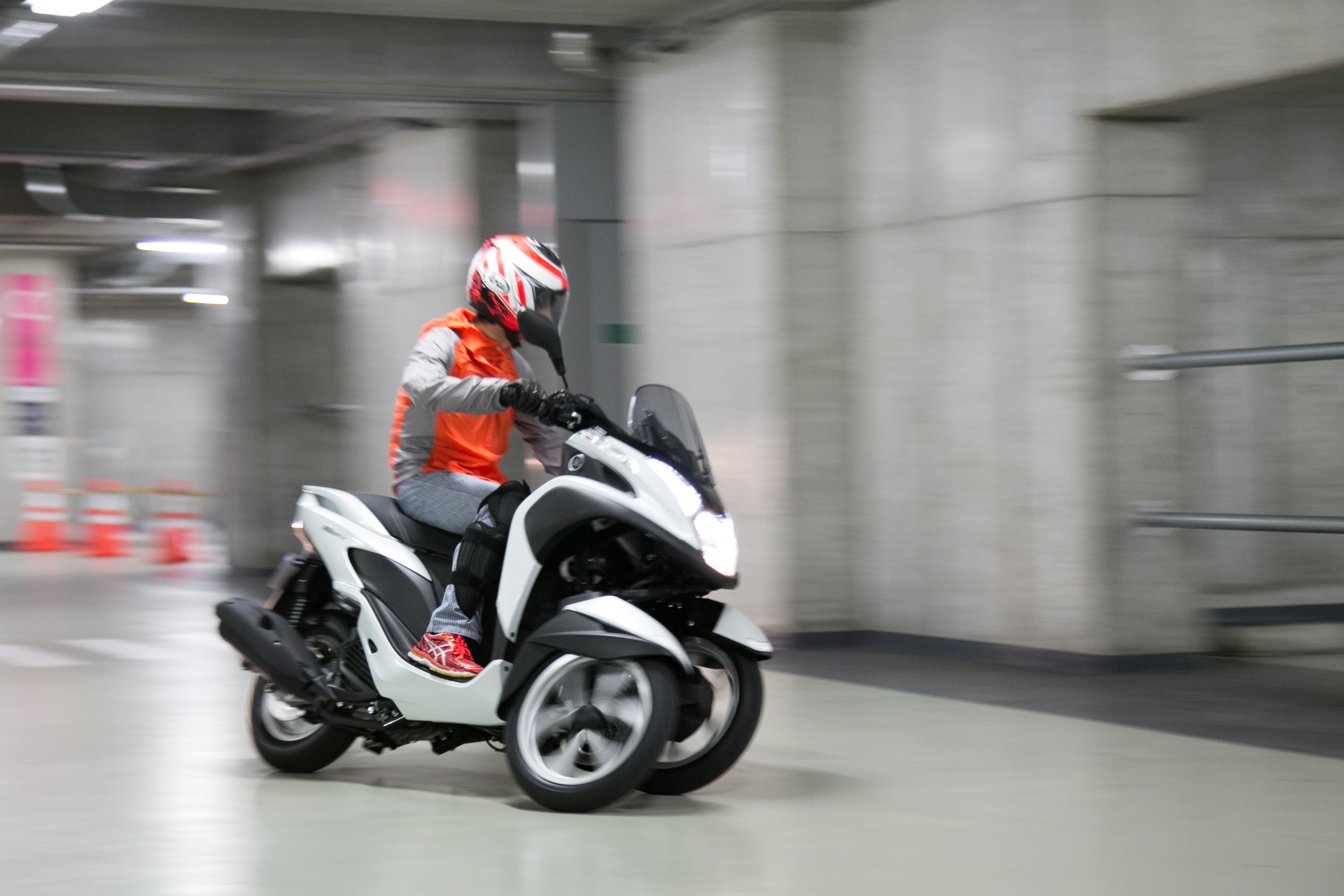
Yamaha Tricity (2F3T)

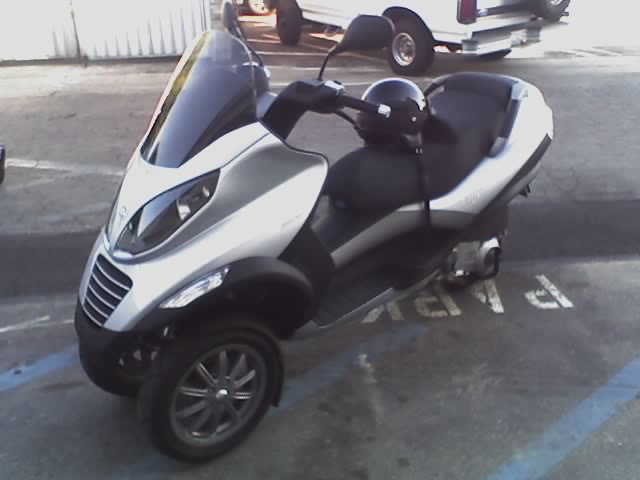
Piaggio MP3 (2F3T)

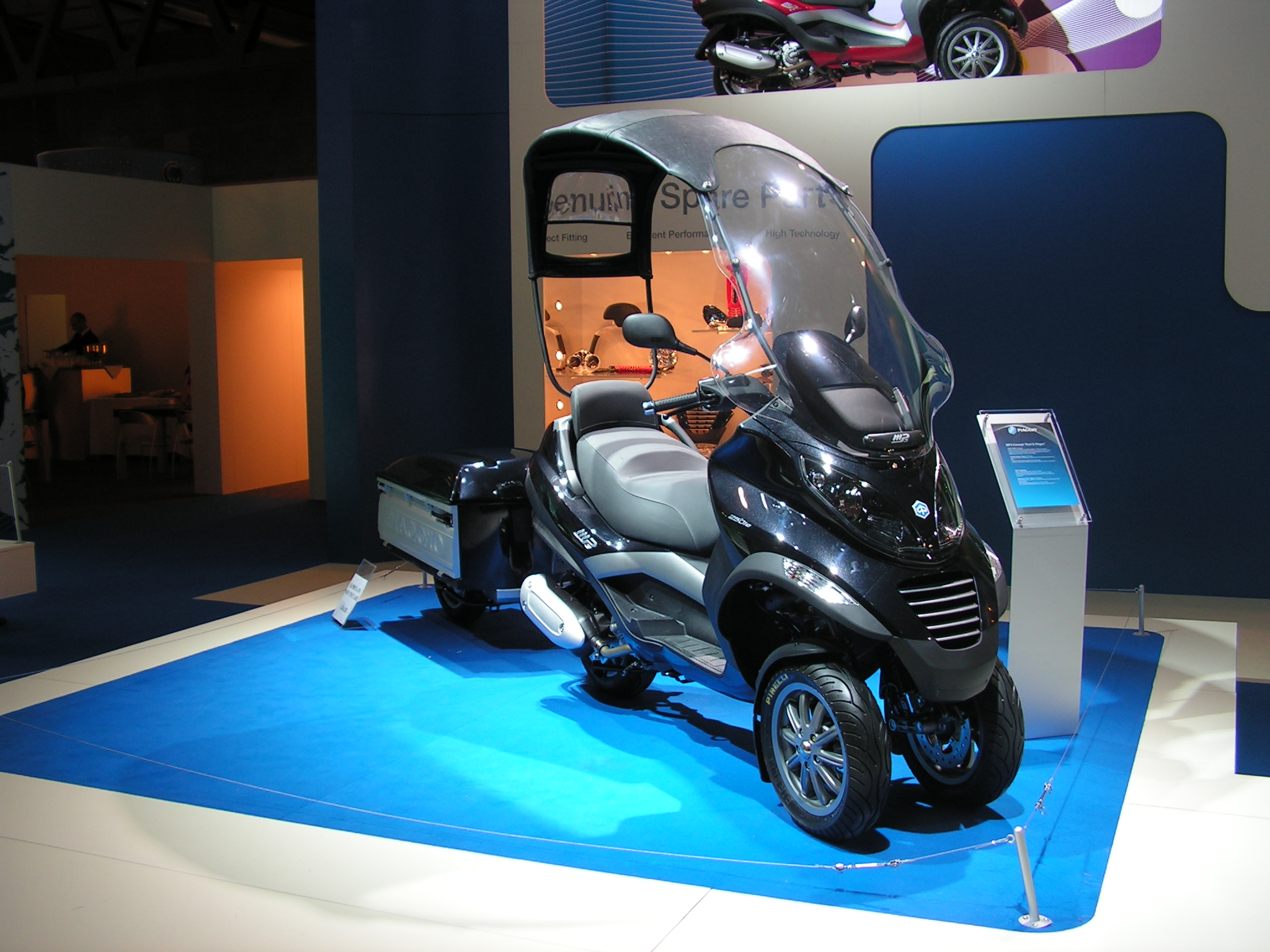
Piaggio MP3 (2F3T) with roof and wagon

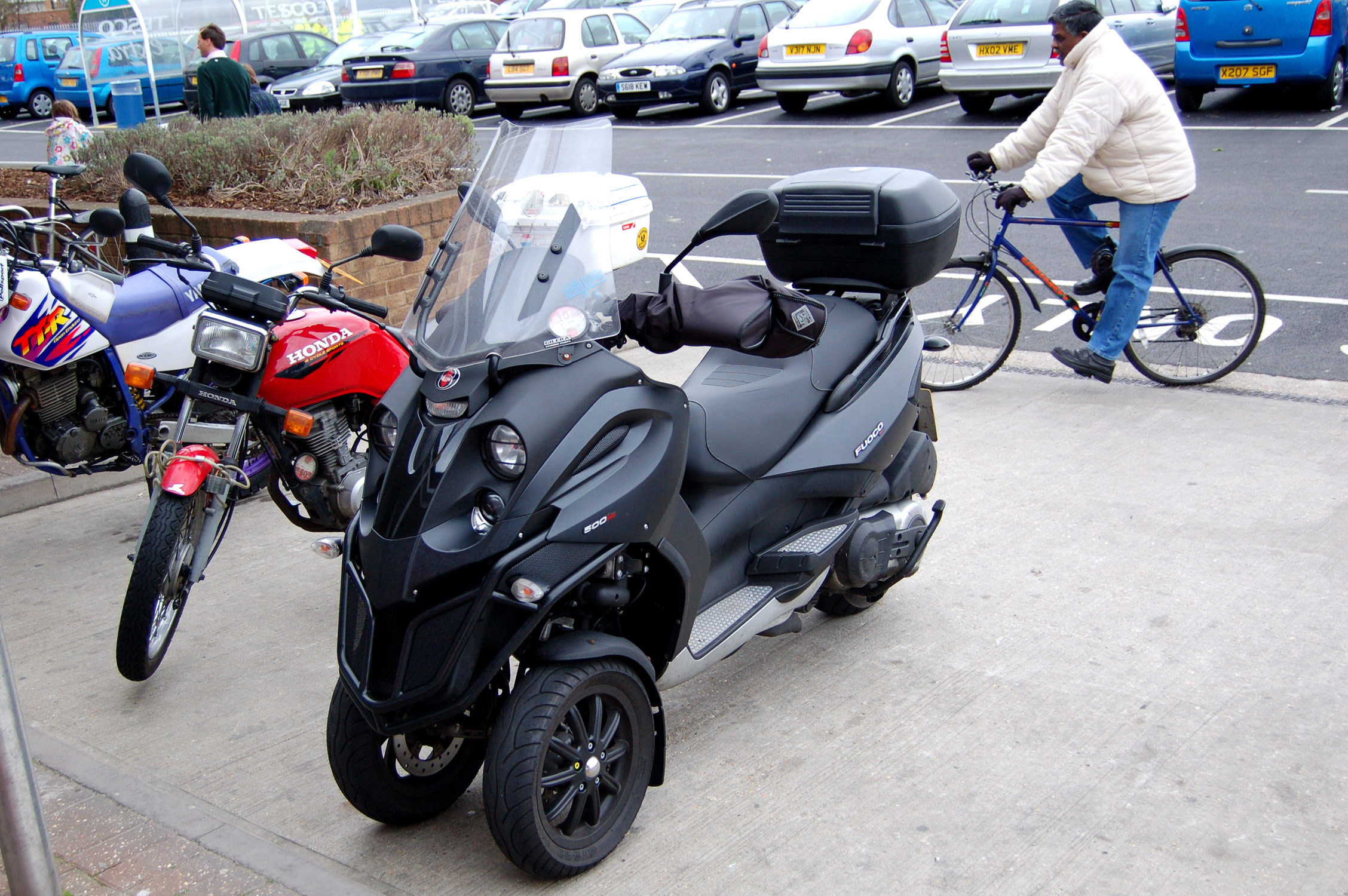
Gilera Fuoco (2F3T)

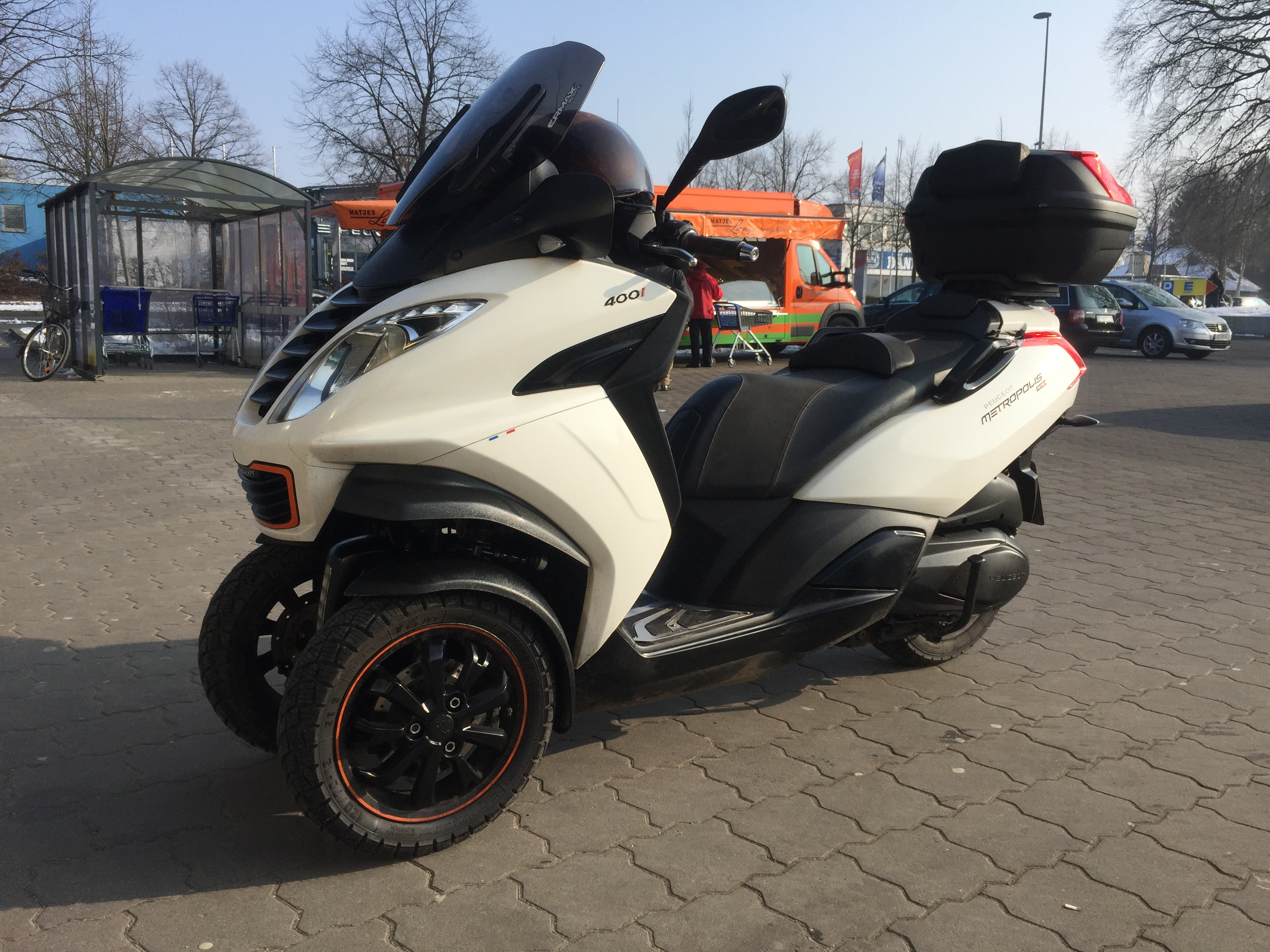
Peugeot Metropolis 400i (2F3T)

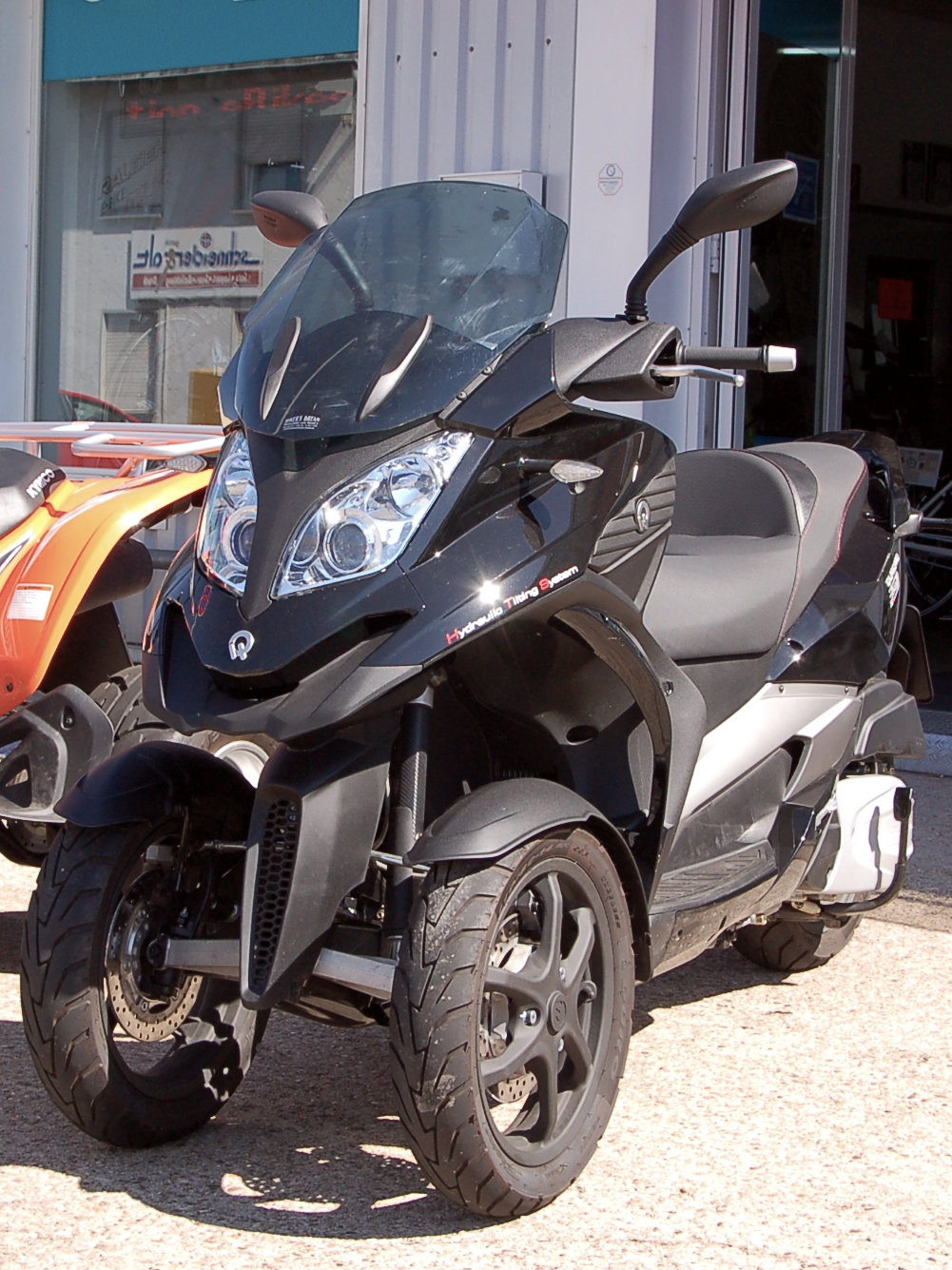
Quadro 350D (2F3T)

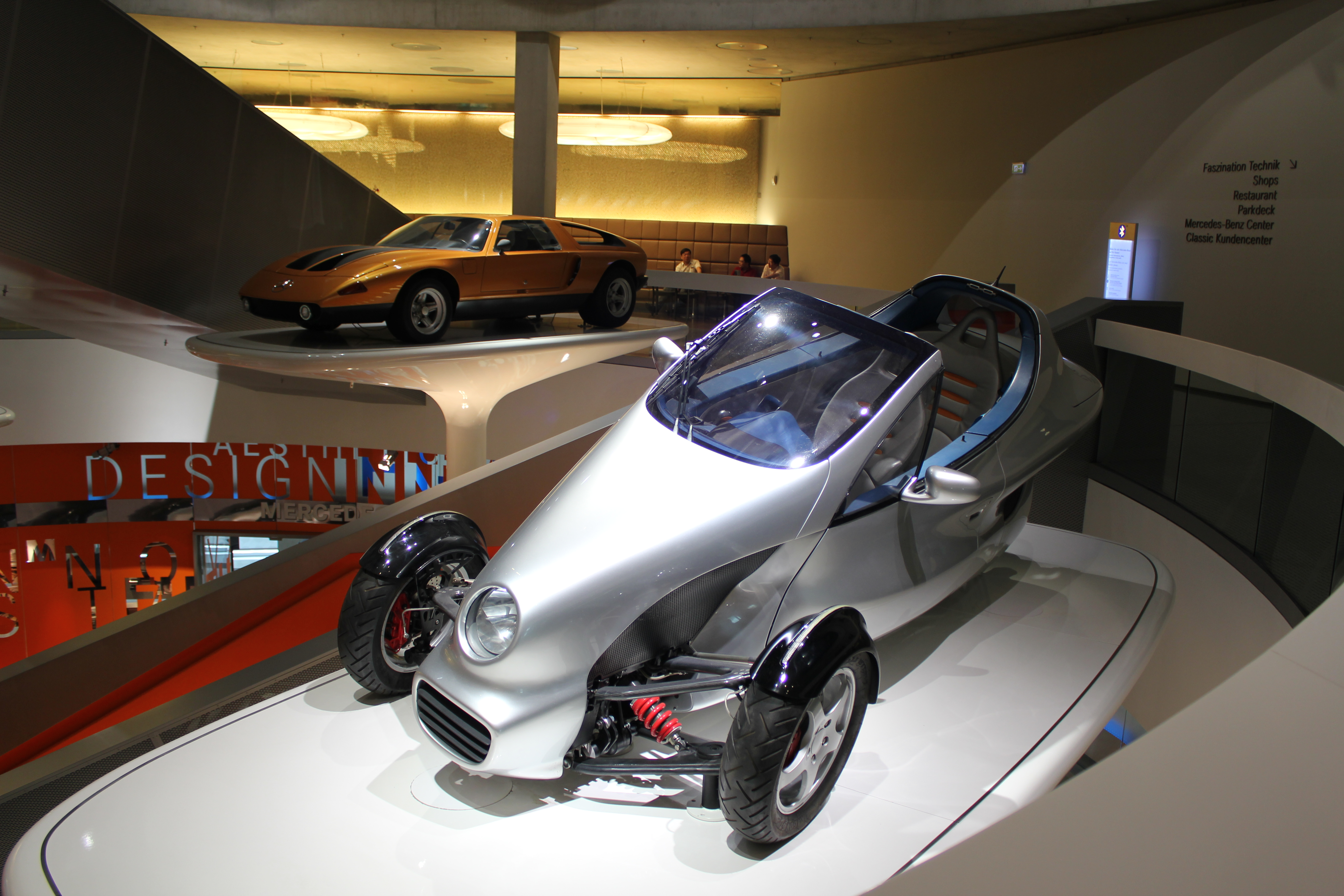
Mercedes-Benz F300 Life Jet Concept Vehicle, 1997. (2F3T)

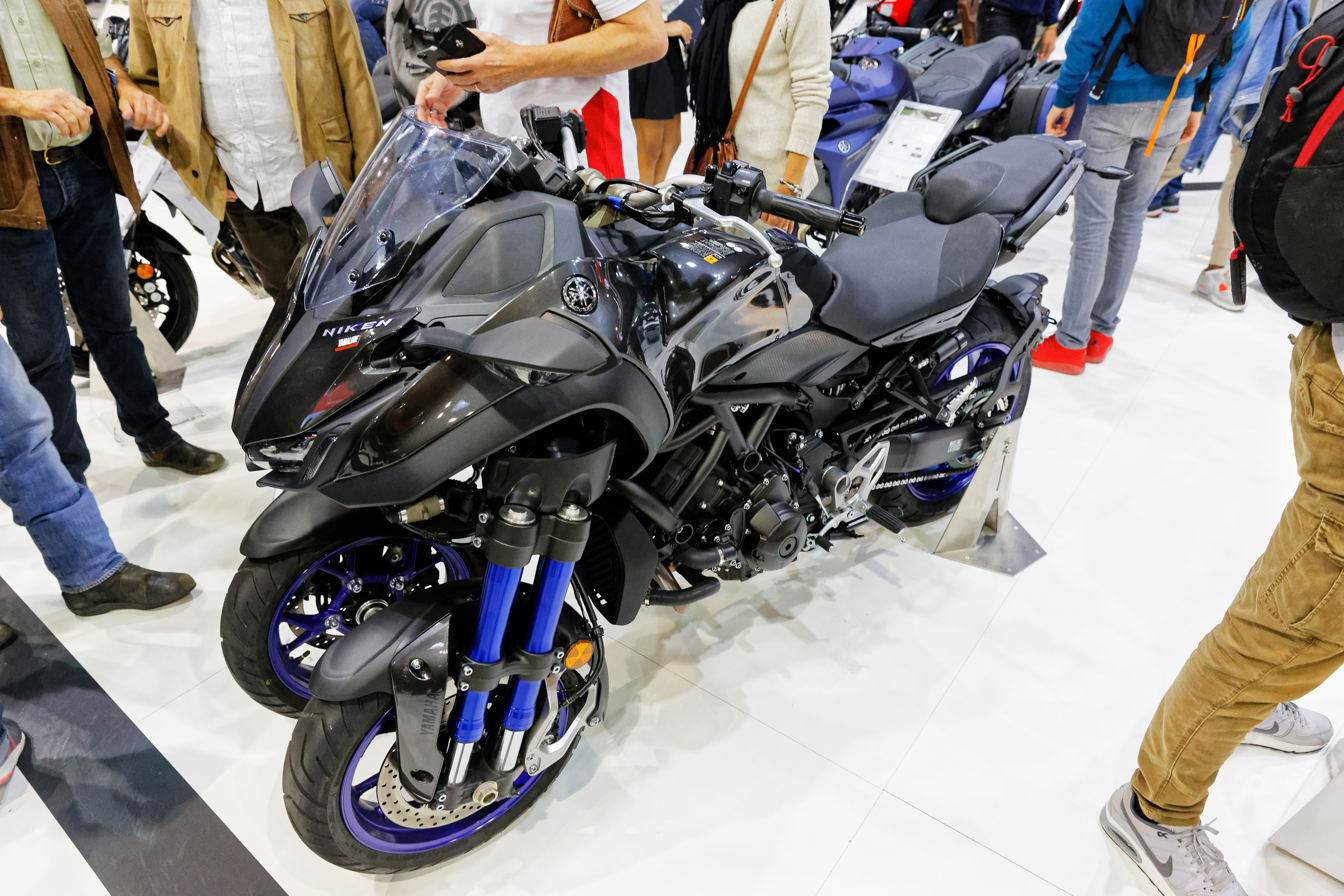
2018 Yamaha Niken. (2F3T)

== See also ==
- Bicycle and motorcycle dynamics
- Flexible sidecar
- Tilting train
- Tilting car

== Bibliography ==
- Poelgeest, A., Edge, K. A. and Darling, J., 2007. Development of a Steer Tilt Controller for a Three Wheeled Tilting Vehicle. In: ASME International Mechanical Engineering Congress and Exposition, 2007-11-01, Seattle, Washington.
- Tilting Three Wheelers - Patents
- The Design, Implementation and Analysis of Motorized Tilting Three-Wheelers. Thesis, Choa-Chin Weng. 18 July 2005. Chinese. English abstract.
- Dynamic Stability of Three-Wheeled Vehicles in Automotive-Type Applications. Robert Q. Riley.
- Carver One
