= Yamaha Niken =

Three-wheeler motorcycle by Yamaha

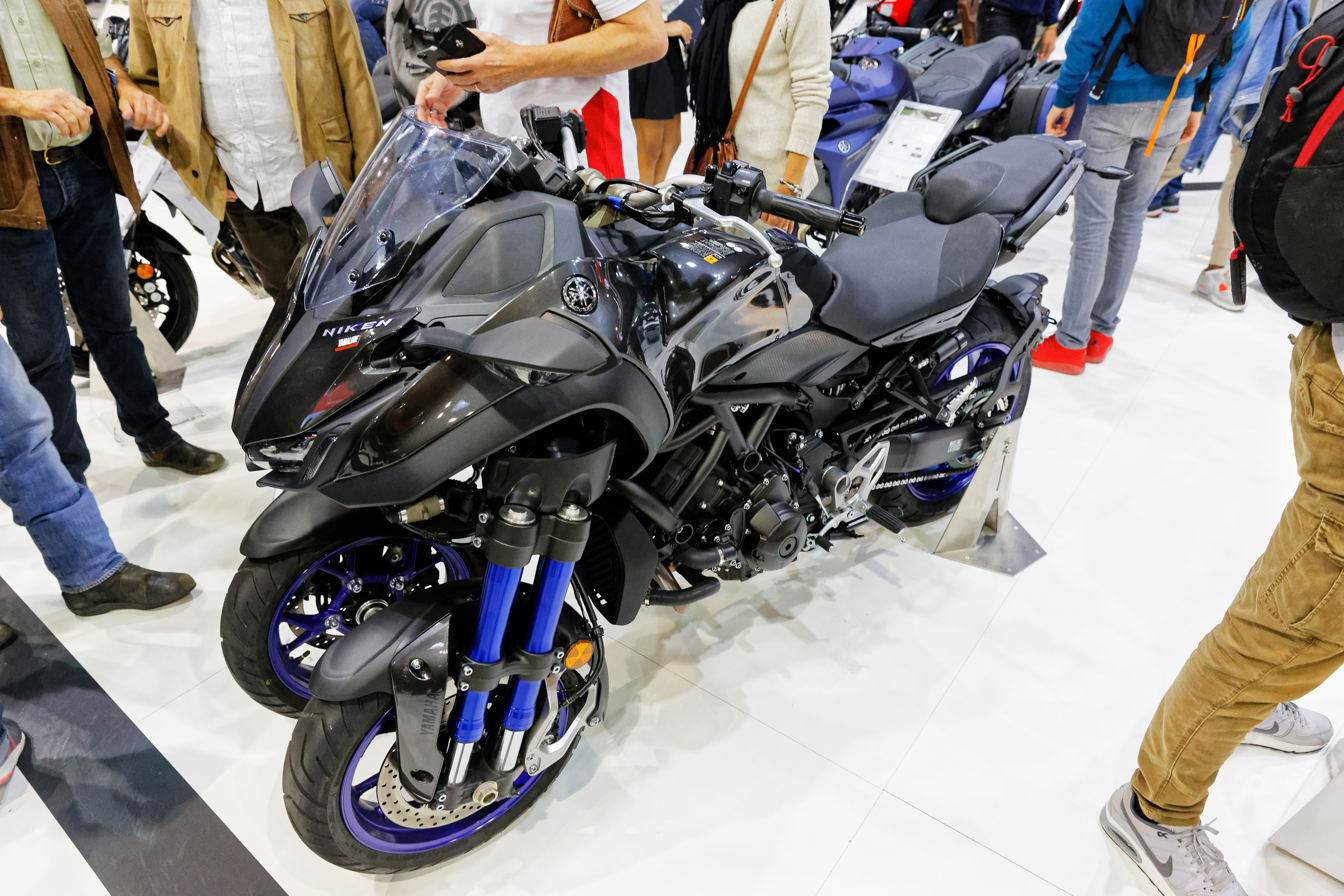
Niken at the 2018 Mondial de l'Automobile exhibition in Paris.

The Yamaha Niken is a 845 cc tilting three-wheeler motorcycle, manufactured since 2018 by Yamaha Motor and sold worldwide.

== Overview ==
The Niken is a commercial version of the concept bike "MWT-9" announced by Yamaha in 2015. As part of Yamaha's LMW line of bikes - Leaning Multi Wheel - the Tricity with 125cc had previously appeared in 2014. The basic concept is that the two front wheels move in conjunction with each other when the vehicle body is tilted, while the body can be moved like a normal motorcycle.

The name Niken is a coined word meaning "two swords", referring to the dynamic movement of the front two wheels like a sword master's two blades.
The development concept was called "New Type of Agility & Controllability".

The model was shown as a concept vehicle at the 2015 Tokyo Motor Show, and launched at the 2017 show. It was announced for release in Japan on September 13, 2018, and order reception began on the same day.

== Technology ==
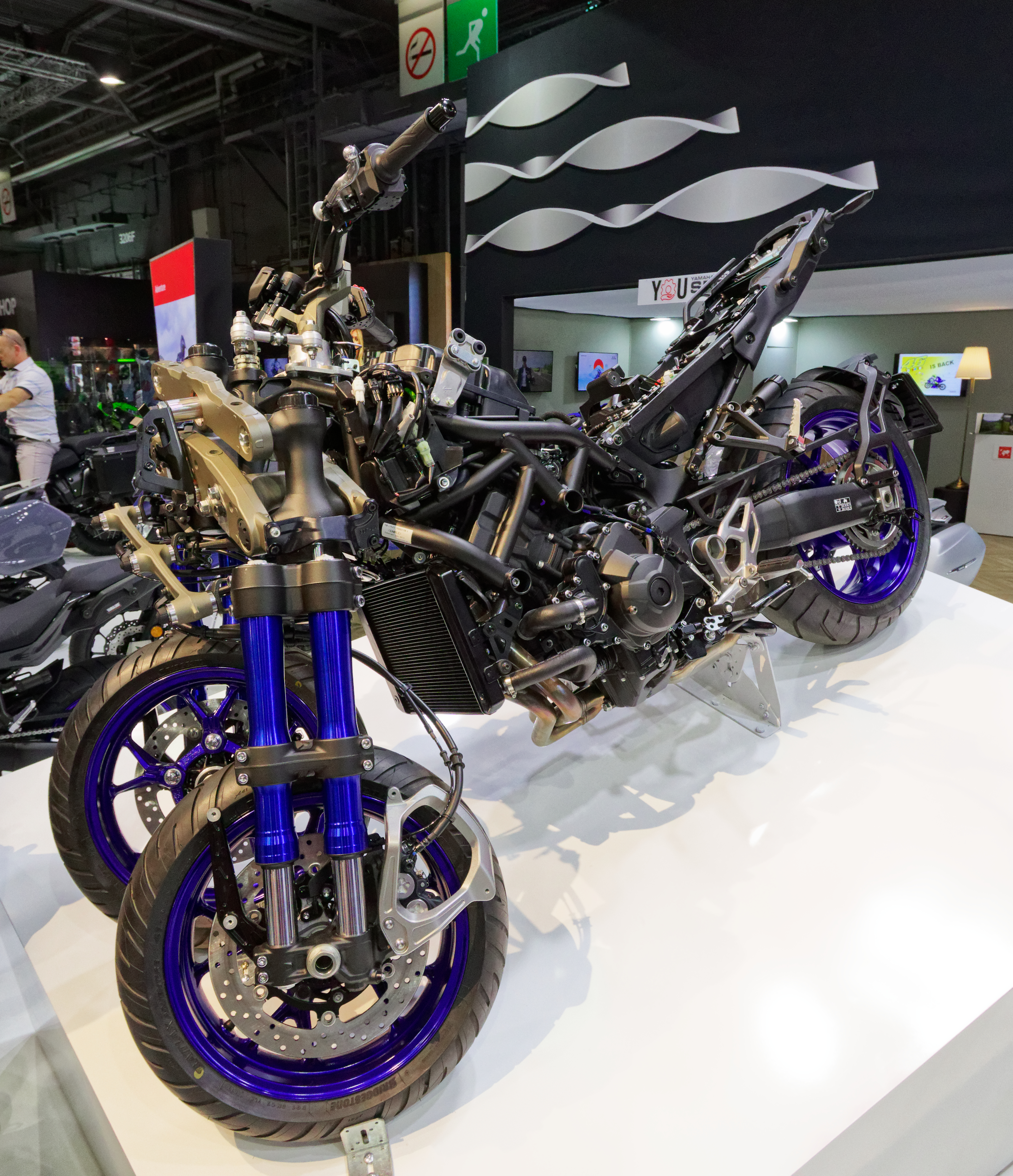
Suspension details of the Niken.

Vehicle equipment:

Water-cooled in-line three-cylinder engine, mechanically identical to the sports naked Yamaha MT-09 and Tracer 900, though the gear ratio and the ECU setup were changed.

- ABS (anti-lock brake system) as standard equipment. Each of the three wheels has its own rotation sensor and brake control device and is individually controlled.
- Cruise control
- Assist slipper clutch
- Quick shift system
- Traction control system (TCS)
- Driving mode switching function
- YCC electric throttle
- 4.8 U.S. gallons (18 liters) fuel tank

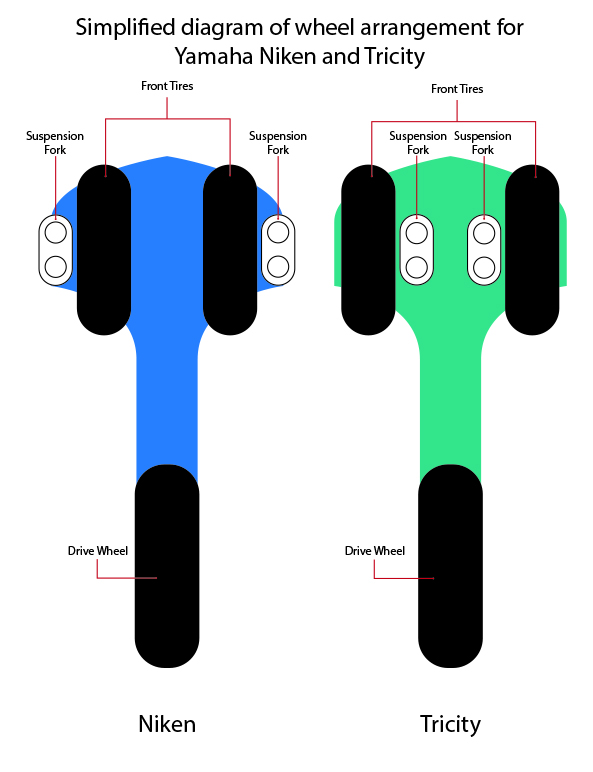
Suspension fork arrangement of Niken and Tricity

The Niken arranges the front fork outboard of the front wheels, in order to allow a bank angle of 45 degrees allowing for higher corner speeds than the Tricity, which has the front fork inboard of the front wheels. The spacing of the front wheels is 410 mm. The newly developed steering mechanism achieves operability and steering very close to that of a normal motorcycle.
The front suspension uses parallel quadrilateral arms to support the cantilevered suspension. It is mounted outboard of the wheels to allow maximum lean and comprises two upside-down fork legs per side – a 43mm rear leg with adjustable preload and damping, and a 41mm front leg which holds the assembly in alignment. Steering forces are applied via a separate group of tie rods and linkages, including offset steering knuckles. They realize the Ackermann steering geometry, similar to most cars in that during a turn the inner wheel turns progressively more than the outside, as it traces a smaller radius in each corner. Stub axles on each side carry cast aluminum wheels of 15 inches size, using 120/70-15 tires.

The additional mechanics lead to 263 kg weight, around 70 kg more than the classical MT-09 motorcycle with the same basic engine.

== Legal status ==
In Japan

According to the Japanese Road Traffic Law, as with the Tricity, the Niken falls under the requirements for three-wheeled vehicles specified in the notification by the Prime Minister and is classified as a Specific Motorcycle, more precisely a Specific Large Motorcycle. This type requires a Large Motorcycle driving license.
The application of the Road Traffic Act and the Road Act is equivalent to that of motorcycles, and the legal maximum speed is 60 km / h on general roads and 100 km / h on national highways. According to the Road Transport Vehicles Act, it is treated as a "motorcycle with sidecar" and is classified as a two-wheeled small car because of its displacement of 400cc or more. Therefore, it is subject to the automobile inspection registration system (vehicle inspection).

== See also ==
- List of motorized trikes
- Honda Gyro
- Piaggio MP3
