= Nissan electric vehicles =

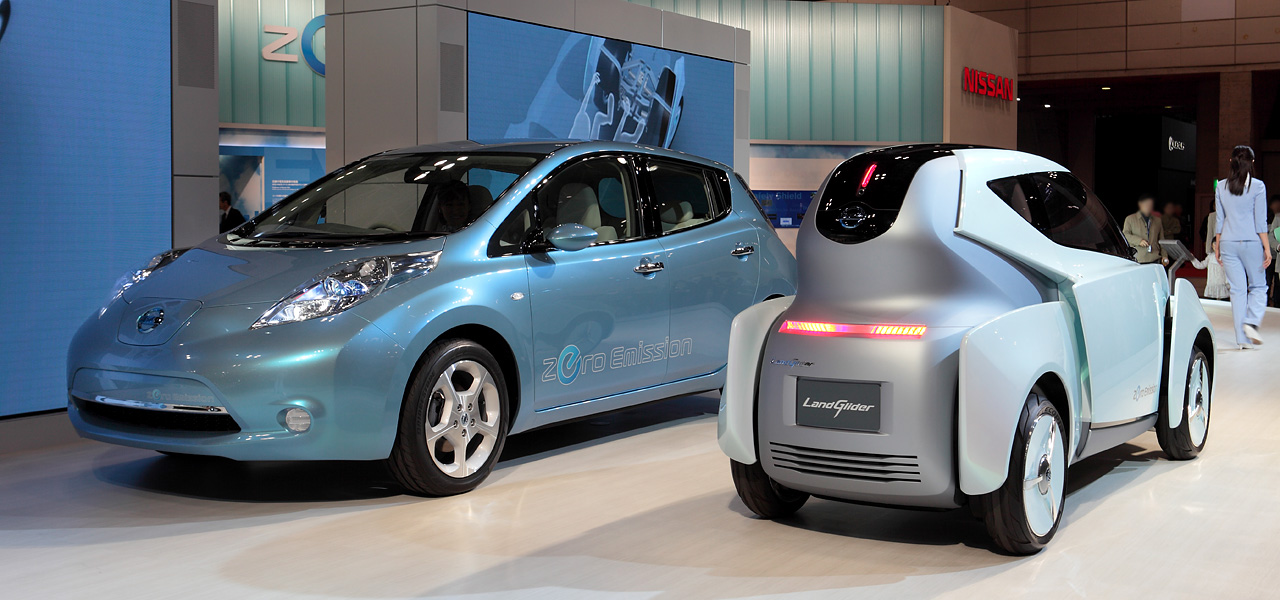
Nissan Leaf and Nissan Land Glider at Tokyo Motor Show 2009

Nissan Motors has developed several concept cars and limited production electric cars, and launched the series production Nissan Leaf all-electric car in December 2010. As of December 2015, the Leaf is the world's all-time best selling highway-capable plug-in electric car with over 200,000 units sold since its introduction.

The Renault-Nissan Alliance committed €4 billion (around US$5.2 billion) into its electric vehicle (EV) and battery development programs with the aim to become the leader in zero-emission transportation. By mid 2015, the Alliance ranked as the world's leading electric vehicle manufacturer with global sales of over 250,000 units delivered since December 2010.

In September 2017 the Alliance announced plans to produce 12 new electric vehicles by 2022 that are made for China in China .

== History ==
In August 2013, Nissan confirmed the company has plans for 5 plug-in vehicles in the future. These 5 include the Nissan LEAF, the Infiniti LE, the Nissan e-NV200, and 2 not yet announced models.

Nissan has a long history of developing and selling electric vehicles in limited numbers. In 1974, they introduced the Nissan Laurel C130-EV, which was originally developed by a company Nissan acquired in 1966, called the Prince Motor Company. In 1946, Prince introduced an electric vehicle, called the Tama, and it was sold in limited numbers.

== Models ==
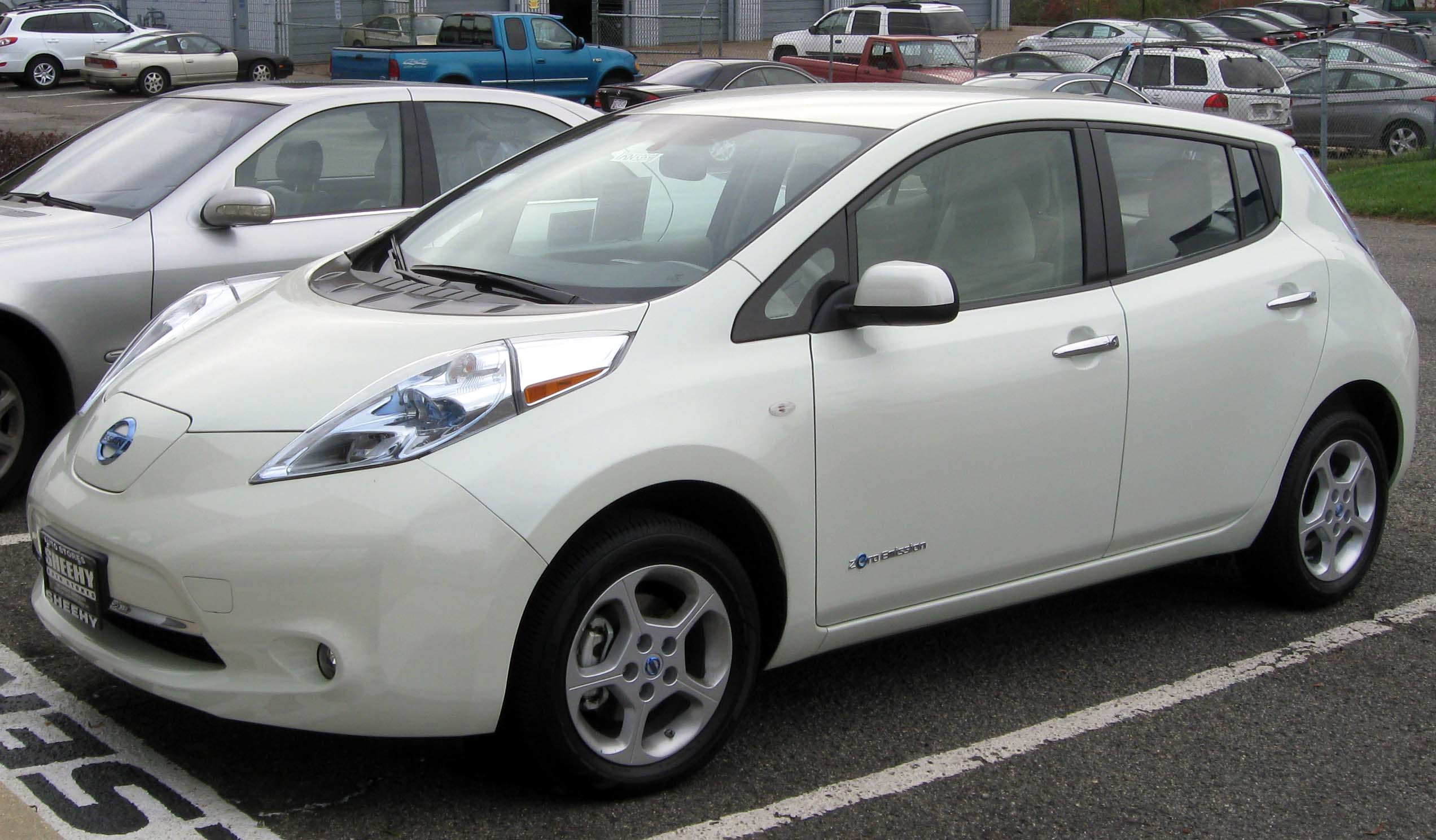
Nissan Leaf

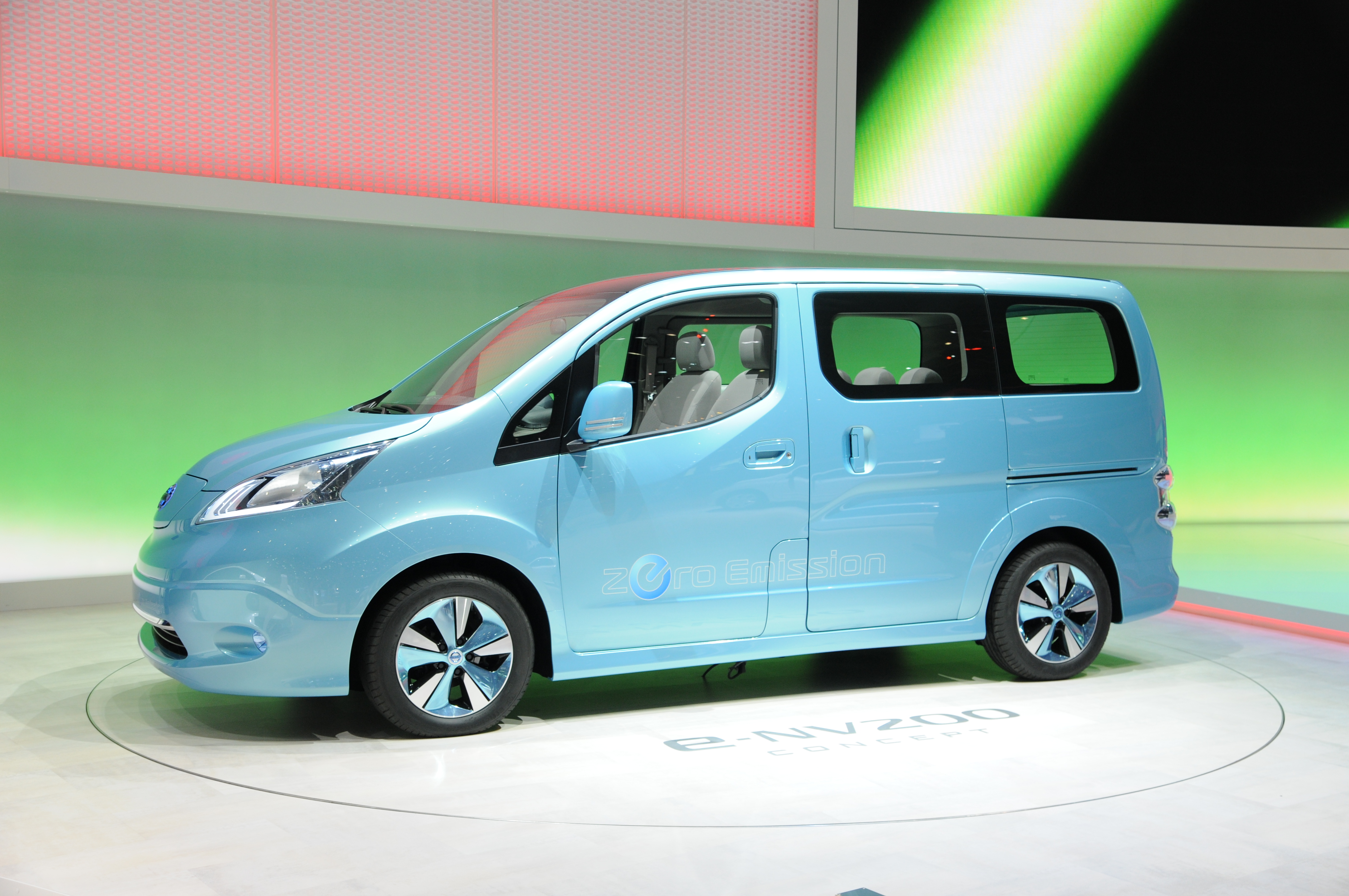
Nissan e-NV200

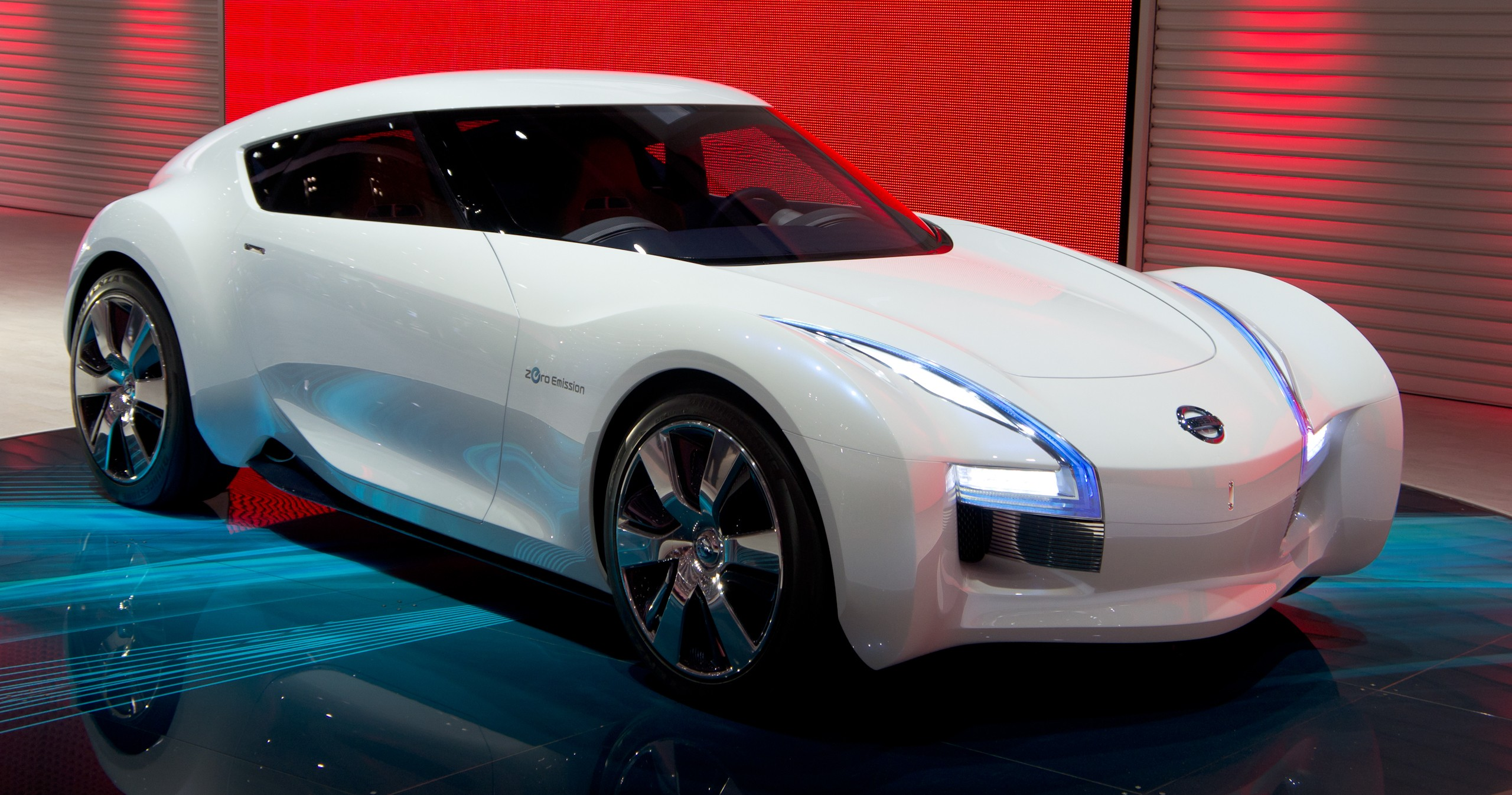
Nissan Esflow

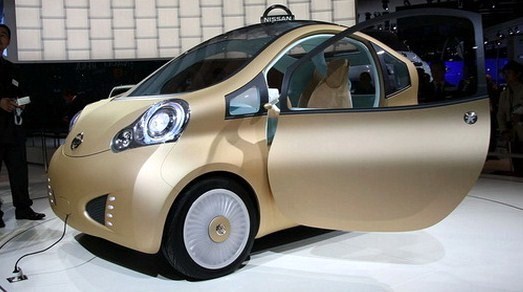
Nissan Nuvu

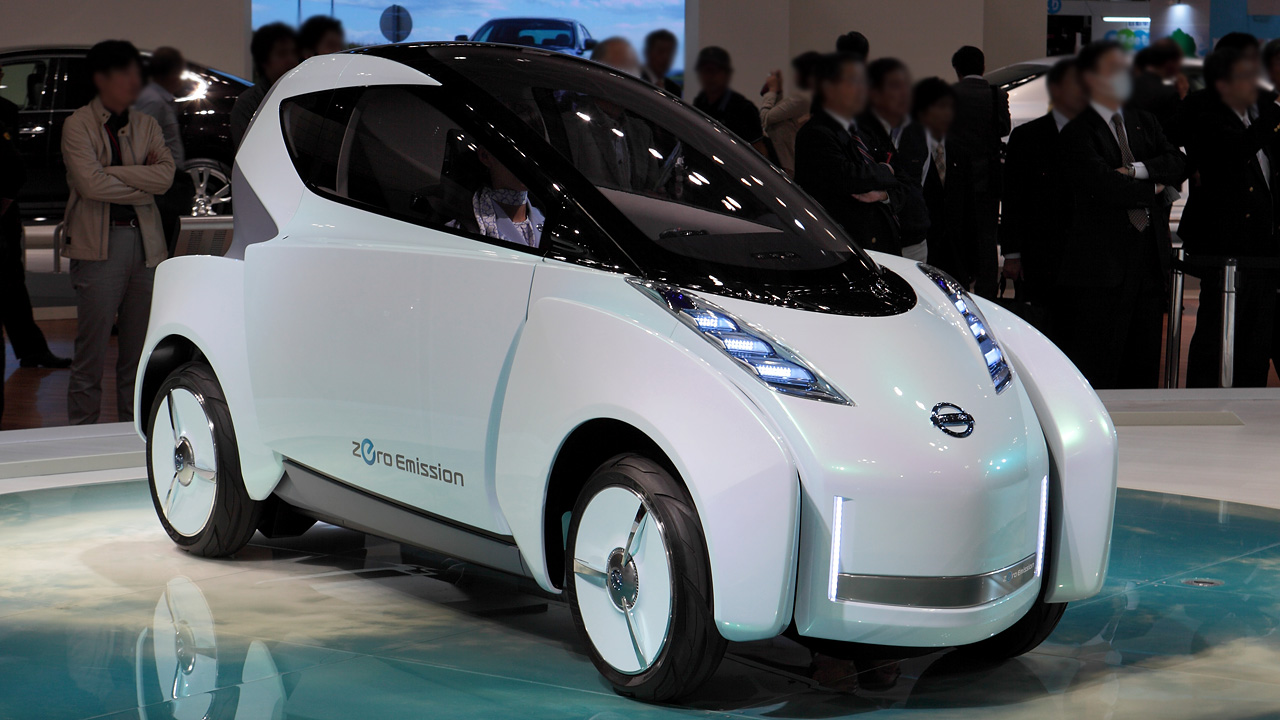
Land Glider

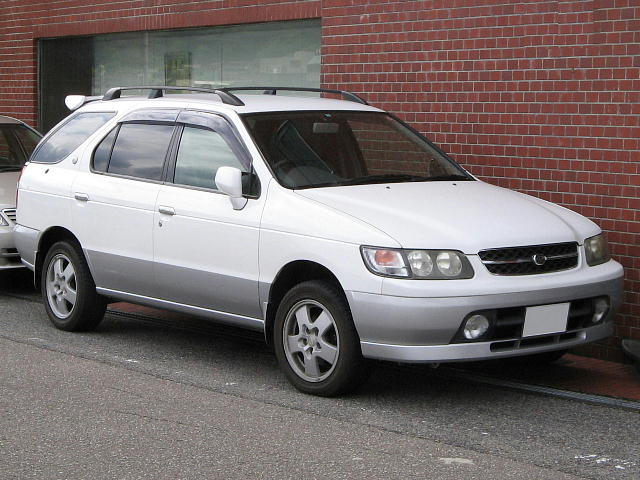
Nissan Altra

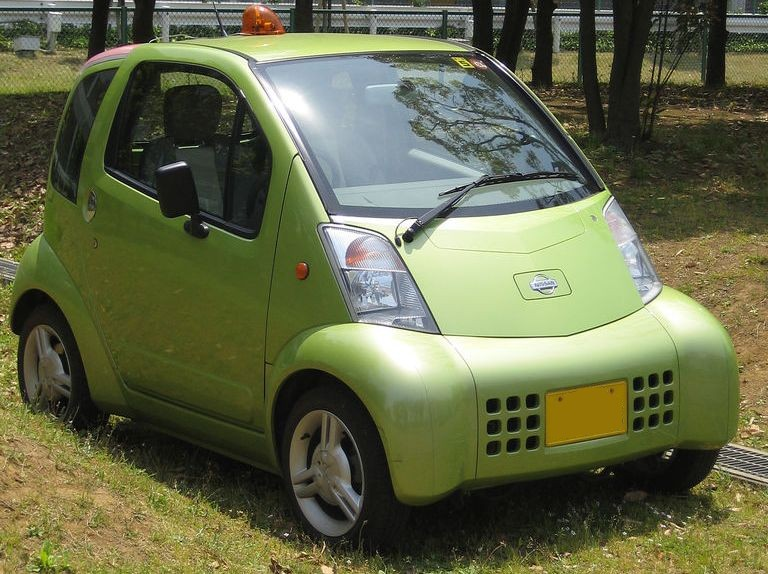
Nissan Hypermini

=== Nissan e-NV200 ===
The all-electric Nissan e-NV200 utility van has a range of 73 mi (117 km), similar to Nissan Leaf. Trials with Japan Post Service began in July 2011, followed by trials with FedEx in London starting in December 2011. More testing with a more advanced pre-production version took place in Singapore, the UK, the U.S. and Brazil. A more extensive 6-month trial with 28 units delivered to British Gas began in the UK in November 2013.

The production version was unveiled at the 2013 Tokyo Motor Show. Nissan started production of the e-NV200 in the first week of May 2014. The e-NV200 was released in Europe in June 2014, followed by Japan in October 2014. Global sales totaled over 5,200 units through October 2015, with 4,752 sold in Europe and about 500 in Japan.

=== Nissan Esflow ===
On February 9, 2011, Nissan introduced the Nissan Esflow, to be unveiled at the March 2011 Geneva Motor Show. It is a sports car weighing less than 1,000 kg (2,000 lb), capable of going 0 to 100 km/h (0 to 60 mph) in under five seconds and having a range of 240 km (150 miles) on a single charge. The body is similar to the Nissan 370Z and the headlights and taillights are similar to the Nissan Juke's. The expected price is US$34,000 to US$40,000.

=== Nissan Townpod ===
Unveiled at the October 2010 Paris Motor Show, the Townpod is a two-door high-tech vehicle cable of performance as both a family car and a work car for entrepreneurs. With the capability to seat five, it has rear fold-down seats. Production dates, prices, and estimated driving range on a single charge have not yet been announced.

=== Nissan Leaf ===
On August 2, 2009, Nissan announced the production of the Nissan Leaf, the company's first series production all-electric vehicle. Deliveries of the electric car began in Japan and the United States in December 2010, followed by various European countries and Canada in 2011. The Leaf is the world's all-time best selling highway-capable all-electric car.

Global sales reached the 50,000 units by mid February 2013, and the 100,000 unit mark by mid January 2014, representing a 45% market share of worldwide pure electric vehicles sold since 2010. The 200,000 unit milestone was reached in early December 2015. Leaf global sales achieved the 300,000 unit milestone in January 2018.

As of January 2018, the Leaf is available in 60 countries in four continents. As of November 2015, the top markets for Leaf sales were the U.S. (88,244), Japan (about 57,000), Europe (about 48,000), and Canada (3,076), together representing about 99% of Leaf global sales. As of September 2015, Norway ranked as the market leader in Europe with 14,736 new units sold,

=== Nissan Nuvu ===
Nissan Nuvu is a compact all-electric city car with 2+1 seating, with solar panels shaped like tree leaves on the roof that channel the sun's power through a "tree trunk" conduit in the center of the vehicle. It can reach about 121 km/h (75 mph) and travel up to about 129 km (80 mi) on an electric charge.

=== Nissan Land Glider ===
Nissan unveiled the narrow, weight-shifting Land Glider Concept at the October 2009 Tokyo Motor Show. The Land Glider looks and feels like a mixture between a car, a motorcycle, and an airplane. The rear-view mirrors have been replaced by cameras and monitors. Inside, the traditional steering wheel is replaced with something similar in appearance to an aircraft's yoke control. Riding on a motorcycle-inspired Tandem architecture, the Land Glider and its tires can lean up to 17 degrees in turns. Power comes from two electric motors connected to lithium-ion batteries mounted underneath the floor. The Land Glider features a non-contact charging system that enables it to be recharged at any wireless charging station.

=== Nissan Altra ===
The Nissan Altra was an electric car produced by Nissan Motors between 1998 and 2002. The Nissan Altra was introduced at the LA Auto Show on 29 December 1997. Nissan described the Altra as a combination of a sedan, SUV, and minivan. It was mainly used as a fleet vehicle for companies such as electric utilities. Only about 200 vehicles were ever produced. It was based on the Nissan R'nessa, and was sold as an R'nessa in the Japanese domestic market.

=== Nissan Hypermini ===
The Hypermini is a two-seater electric car produced by Nissan Motors. It was introduced in a limited way in Japan in 1999. It was launched for retail sale through Nissan dealers in the greater Tokyo, Osaka, and Kyoto metropolitan areas in February 2000, priced at ¥4,000,000 (about US$36,567) with a 200-volt mount-type battery charger and ¥4,015,000 with a 200-volt non-fixed battery charger. Sales were targeted principally at national government offices and agencies, local government bodies and corporations. Nissan claims the Hypermini consumes a quarter the energy of a typical car.

=== Nissan Ariya ===
The Ariya is a midsize electric SUV that was introduced in January of 2022, at a starting price of $45,950.

== See also ==
- Infiniti LE
- Renault Z.E., from Nissan-Renault Group.
