= Outline of vehicles =

Overview of and topical guide to vehicles

The following outline is provided as an overview of and topical guide to vehicles:

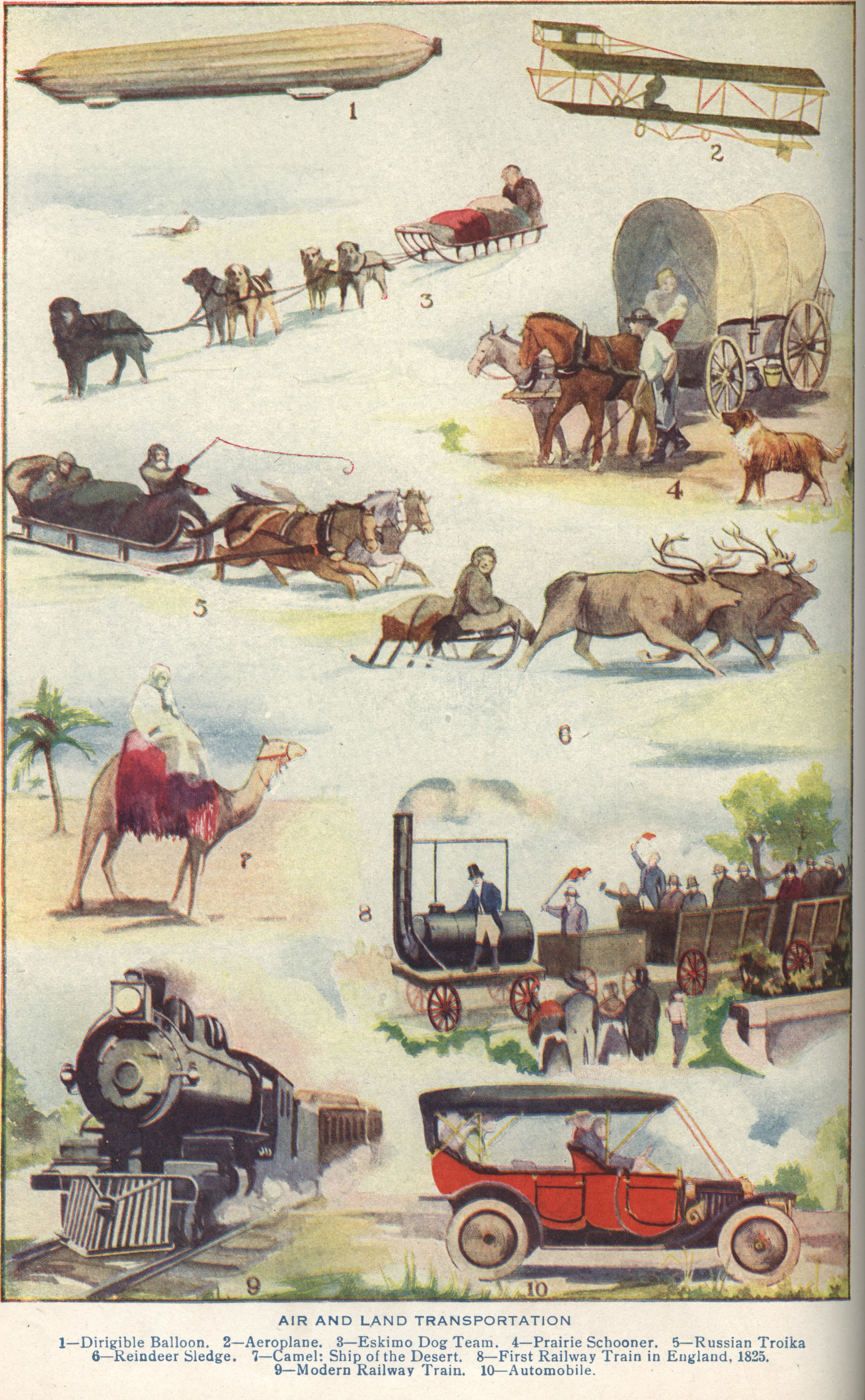

Vehicle – non-living means of transportation. Vehicles are most often human-made, although some other means of transportation which are not made by humans can also be called vehicles; examples include icebergs and floating tree trunks.

== Types of vehicles ==
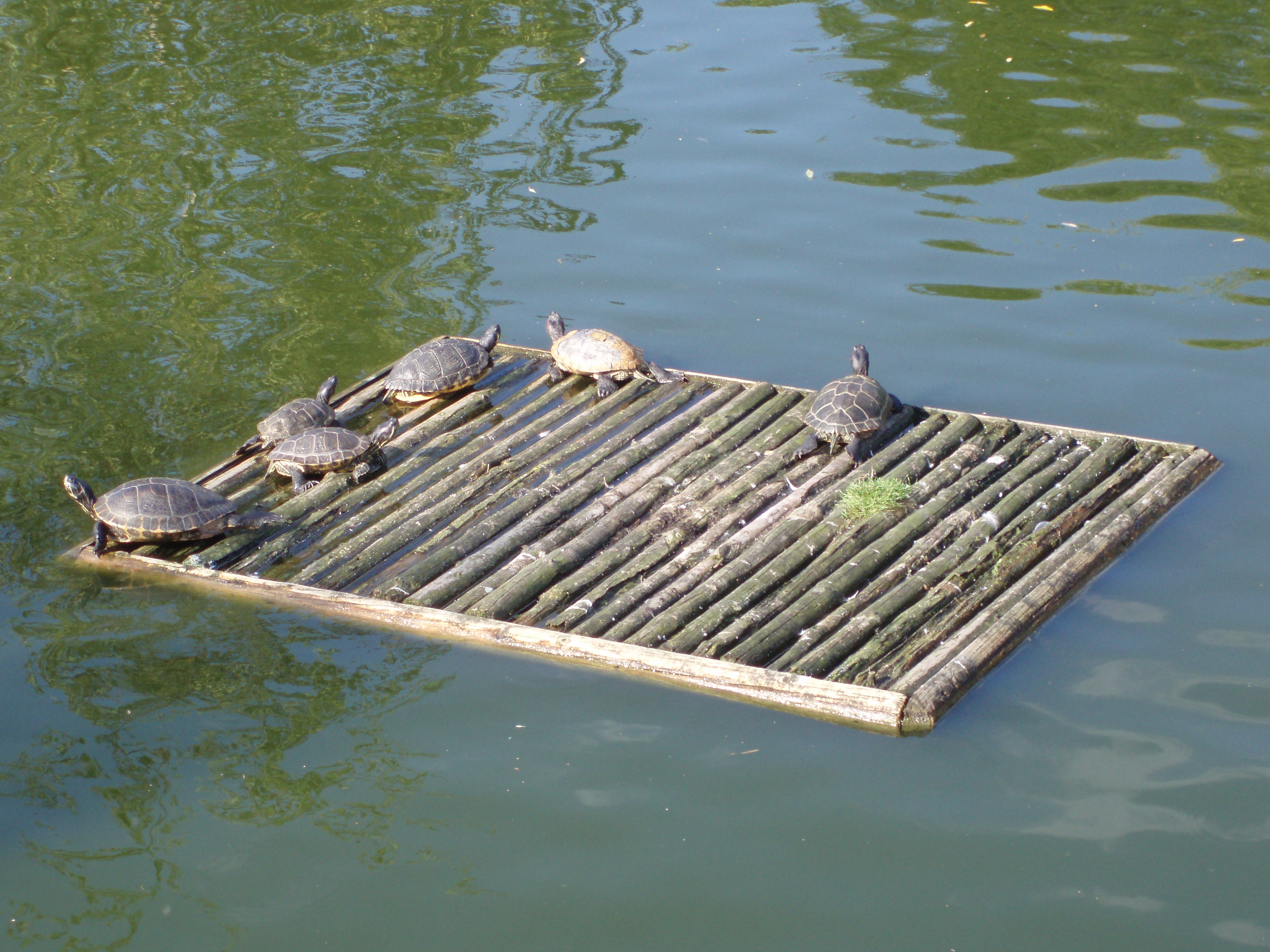
Raft is used for traveling around slow-moving water

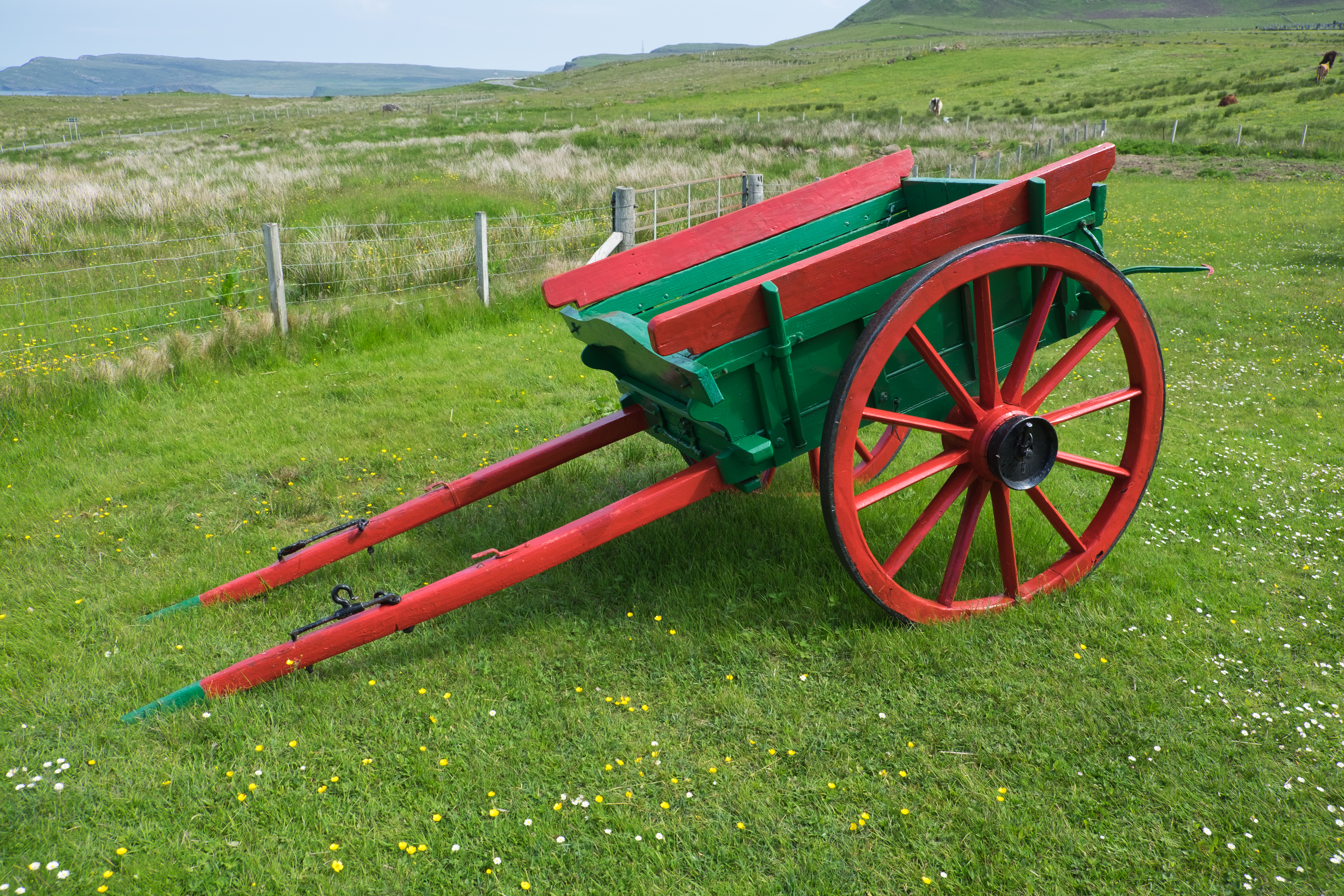
Cart useful for moving things

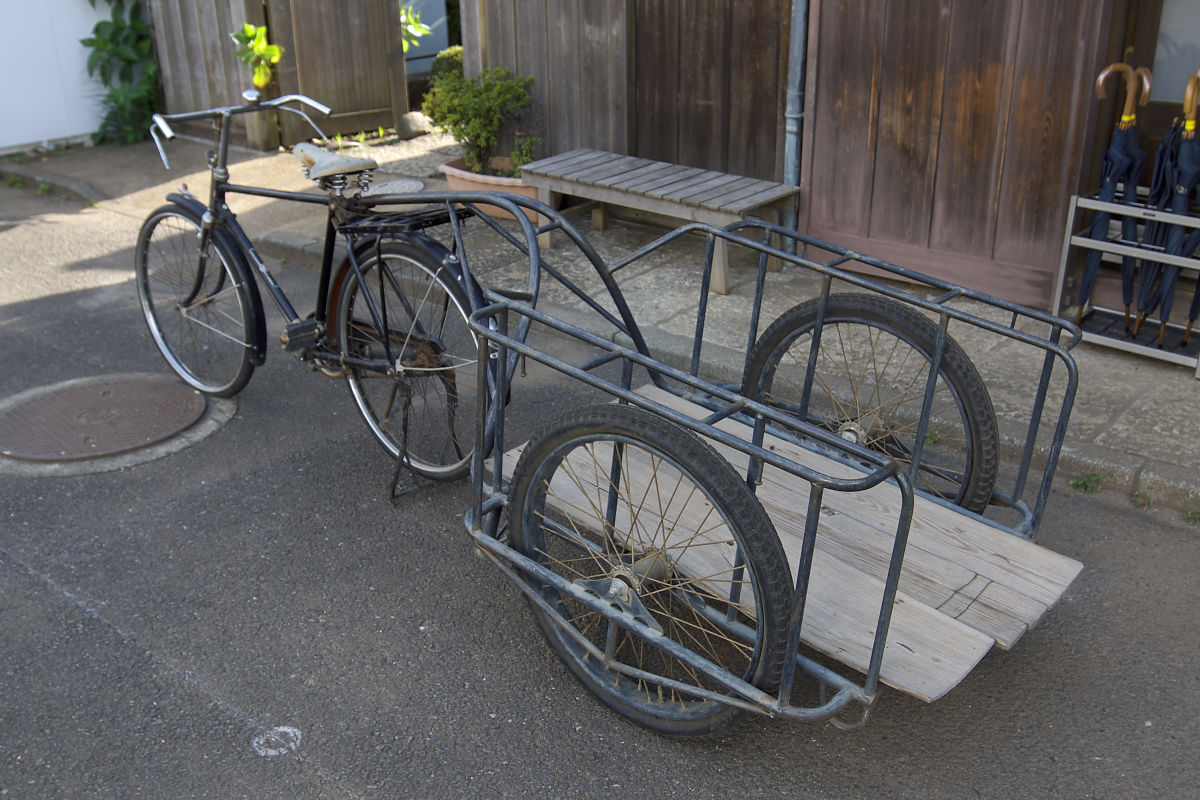
Bicycle with cart

- Aerosledge
- All-terrain vehicle
- Amphibious all-terrain vehicle
- Amphibious vehicle
- Auto rickshaw
- Bathyscaphe
- Cable car
- Catamaran
- Coach (bus)
- Coach (carriage)
- Cycle rickshaw
- Dandy horse
- Deep Submergence Vehicle
- Diver Propulsion Vehicle
- Diving bell
- Diving chamber
- Dog sled
- Draisine
- Electric vehicle
- Golf cart
- Ground effect vehicle
- Handcar
- Hopper
- Hovercraft
- Jet ski
- Kick scooter
- Land yacht
- Launch escape capsule
- Locomotive
- Maglev
- Minibus
- Minivan
- Monorail
- Monowheel
- Moped
- Narrow-track vehicle
- Omni Directional Vehicle
- Ornithopter
- Passenger car
- Rickshaw
- Pedalo
- Pogo Stick
- Powered parachute
- Quadracycle
- Race car
- Road train
- Rocket
- Rocket sled
- Rover
- Screw-propelled vehicle
- Sea tractor
- Single-track vehicle
- Tilting trike

=== Aircraft ===
Aircraft

- Airplane
- Airship
- Autogyro
- Balloon (aeronautics)
- Blimp
- Fixed-wing aircraft
- Glider aircraft
- Ground effect vehicle
- Hang glider
- Helicopter
- Jet aircraft
- Jet pack
- Wingpack
- Paramotor
- Powered parachute
- Ornithopter
- Rocket
- Escape capsule
- Unmanned aerial vehicle

=== Landcraft ===
Landcraft

- All terrain vehicle
- Amphibious all-terrain vehicle
- Amphibious vehicle
- Automobile
- Autorickshaw
- Aerosledge
- Bicycle
- Bus
- Cable car
- Car
- Coach (bus)
- Coach (carriage)
- Cycle rickshaw
- Dandy horse
- Dog sled
- Draisine
- Electric vehicle
- Golf cart
- Kick scooter
- Landship
- Narrow-track vehicle
- Maglev
- Military vehicle
- Minibus
- Minivan
- Monorail
- Motorcycle
- Motorhome
- Monowheel
- Moped
- Off-road vehicle
- Scooter (motorcycle)
- Segway Personal Transporter
- Passenger car
- Pickup truck
- Pogo stick
- Omni directional vehicle
- Quadracycle
- Single-track vehicle
- Skateboard
- Screw propelled vehicle
- Sedan
- Semi-trailer truck
- Sled
- Snowboard
- Snowmobile
- Space Hopper
- Sports car
- Steam car
- Street legal vehicle
- Sport utility vehicle
- Tilting trike
- Tank
- Tractor
- Traction engine
- Race car
- Recreational vehicle
- Road train
- Rickshaw
- Land yacht
- Locomotive
- Rocket sled
- Rover
- Train
- Tram
- Tricycle
- Trolleybus
- Truck
- Unicycle
- Van
- Velocipede
- Velomobile
- Wagon
- Wheelbarrow
- Wheelchair

=== Watercraft ===
Watercraft

- Bathyscape
- Boat
- Catamaran
- Deep submergence vehicle
- Diving Bell
- Diving chamber
- Canoe
- Hovercraft
- Hydrofoil
- Kayak
- Pedalo
- Jet ski
- Sailboat
- Sea tractor
- Ship
- Steamboat
- Submarine
- Submersible
- Surfboard
- Yacht

=== Spacecraft ===
Spacecraft

- Lander
- Launch vehicle
- Rocket
- Satellite
- Spaceplane
- Spaceship
- Space station

== Hypothetical vehicles ==
In works of either fiction of hypothetical science, certain vehicle had been imagined to transport people and/or cargo beyond the traditional domains of land, sea, air and space. Of which time travel is the most popular. However, traveling between dimensions has also been seen as an alternative to time travel.

=== Timecraft ===
Timecraft

- Time machine

== History of vehicles ==
- History of the automobile
- History of the bicycle
- History of the electric vehicle
- History of motorcycles
- History of steam road vehicles

== General vehicle-related concepts ==
- Detroit
- Fuel efficiency

== Vehicle-related lists ==
- List of aircraft
- List of bicycle types
- List of cars
- List of locomotives
- List of military vehicles
- List of ships
- List of spacecraft
- List of truck types
- List of vehicle instruments

== See also ==
- Outline of transport
- Outline of transport planning
