= Tilting car =

Automobile that changes the angle between the road and the bottom of the passenger cabin

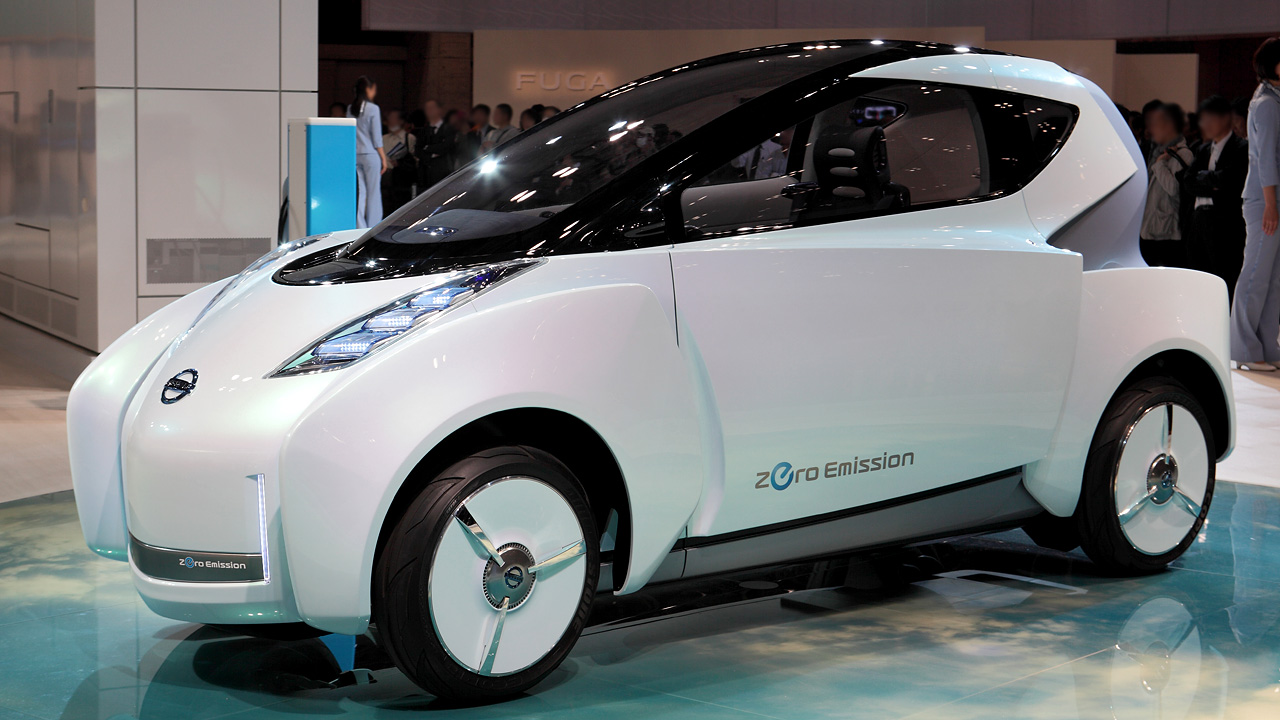
The Nissan Land Glider, a concept car that could tilt up to 17 degrees on a turn

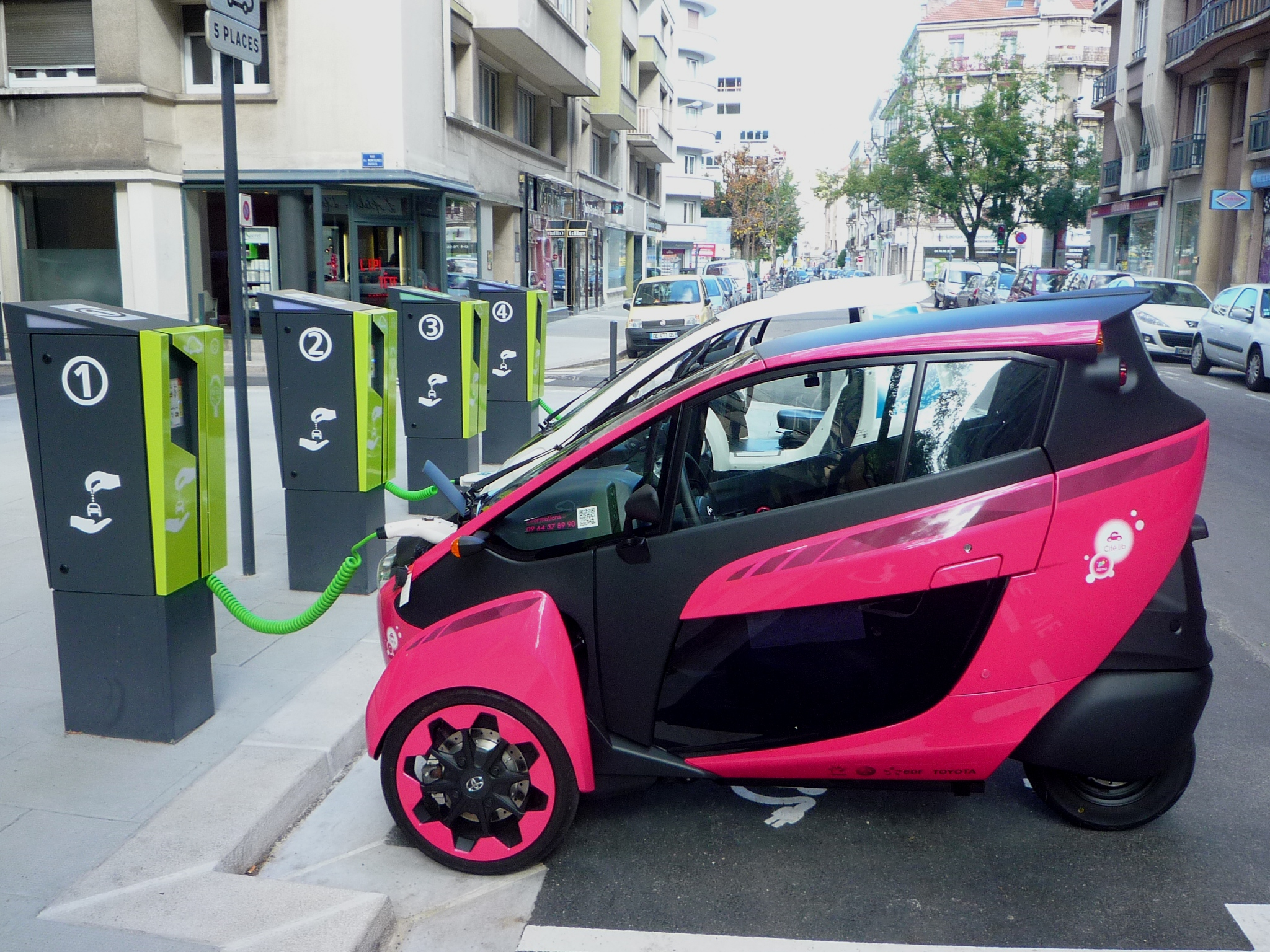
The Toyota i-Road, which used an automatic tilting system called "Active Lean"

A tilting car is a type of automobile that has the ability to change the angle between the road and the bottom of the passenger cabin in a way that allows it to avoid rolling over while the vehicle is driving through a curve. Tilting is critically important for narrow-track vehicles because unlike wider vehicles, the acceleration required to make a non-tilting narrow vehicle skid during a curve is less than that required to make it roll over; tilting allows narrow-track vehicles to "lean into the curve". Tilting cars may have three or four wheels.

== Prototypes and examples ==
Several prototypes tilting cars have been built since 1950. Some include:

- Ford Gyron (1961)
- Lean Machine (General Motors, 1970s)
- F-300 Life-jet (Mercedes-Benz, 1997)
- Carver One (Carver, 2002),
- CLEVER (2003)
- Lumeneo Smera (2008)
- Nissan Land Glider (2009)
- Tilter Tilter (2011)
- Toyota i-Road (Toyota, 2013)

The Mercedes-Benz S-Class (C217) was a production car that could tilt up to 2.5 degrees, detecting curves with a camera and acceleration sensor. Its production model was first unveiled in 2014.

== See also ==
- Tilting three-wheeler
- Tilting train
- Narrow-track vehicle
