= Vehicle =

Mobile equipment that transports people, animals or cargo

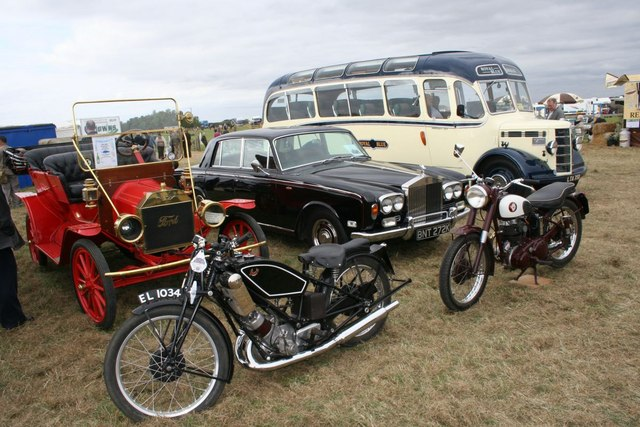
Cars, motorcycles, and a bus on display in Thame, England in 2009

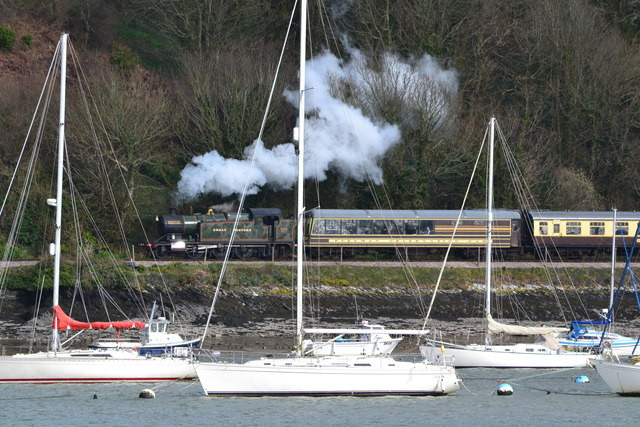
A train passing a group of boats near the River Dart, England in 2016

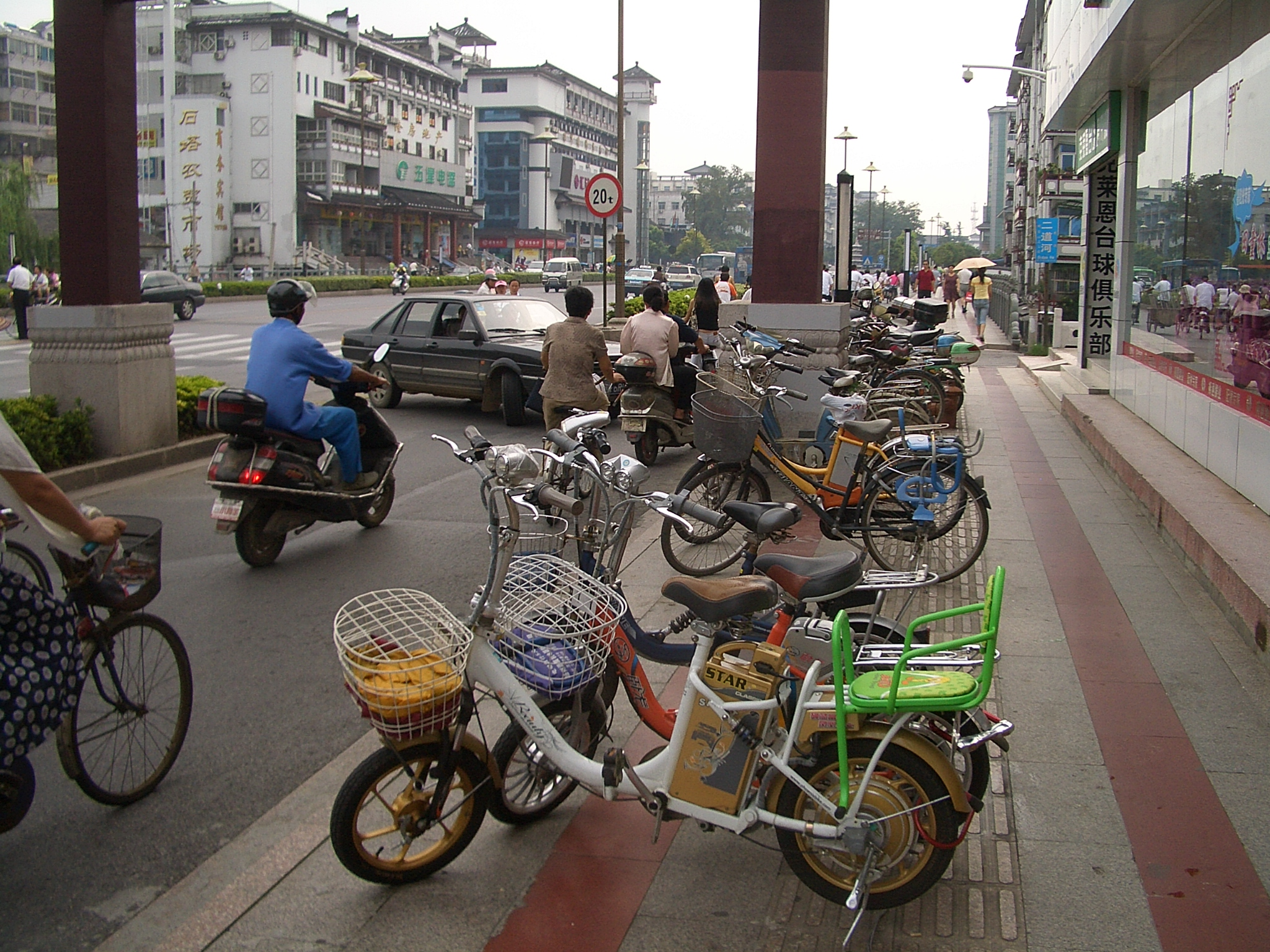
Bicycles, electric bicycles, and scooters in Yangzhou, China in 2008

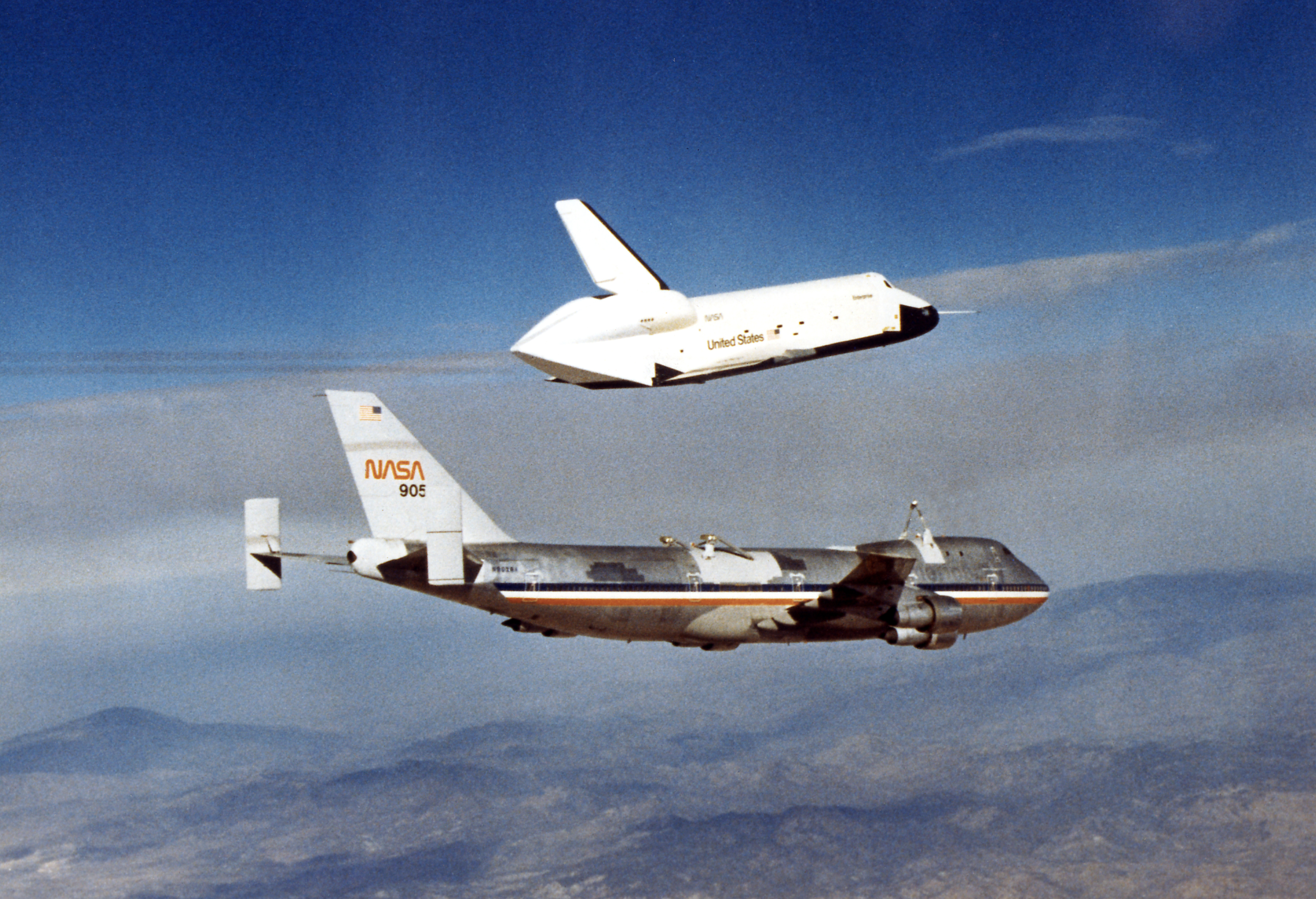
A Space Shuttle and a 747 above California, United States in 1977

A vehicle (from Latin vehiculum) is a device for carrying or transport people, cargo, or both. The term "vehicle" typically refers to ground transport vehicles such as human-powered land vehicles (e.g. bicycles, tricycles, velomobiles, wheel chairs, kick bikes) and animal-powered transports (e.g. horse-drawn carriages/wagons, ox carts, dog sleds), as well as motor vehicles (e.g. motorcycles, cars, trucks, buses, mobility scooters) and railed vehicles (trains, trams and monorails). More broadly, it also includes cable transport (cable cars and elevators), watercraft (ships, boats and underwater vehicles), amphibious vehicles (e.g. screw-propelled vehicles, hovercraft, seaplanes), aircraft (airplanes, helicopters, gliders and aerostats), and space vehicles (spacecraft, spaceplanes and launch vehicles).

This article primarily concerns the more ubiquitous land vehicles, which can be broadly classified by the type of contact interface with the ground: wheels, tracks, rails or skis, as well as the non-contact technologies such as maglev. ISO 3833-1977 is the international standard for road vehicle types, terms and definitions.

== History ==
It is estimated by historians that boats have been used since prehistory; rock paintings depicting boats, dated from around 50,000 to 15,000 BC, were found in Australia. The oldest boats found by archaeological excavation are logboats, with the oldest logboat found, the Pesse canoe found in a bog in the Netherlands, being carbon dated to 8040–7510 BC, making it 9,500–10,000 years old, A 7,000 year-old seagoing boat made from reeds and tar has been found in Kuwait. Boats were used between 4000 -3000 BC in Sumer, ancient Egypt and in the Indian Ocean.

There is evidence of camel pulled wheeled vehicles about 4000–3000 BC. The earliest evidence of a wagonway, a predecessor of the railway, found so far was the 6 to 8.5 km (4 to 5 mi) long Diolkos wagonway, which transported boats across the Isthmus of Corinth in Greece since around 600 BC. Wheeled vehicles pulled by men and animals ran in grooves in limestone, which provided the track element, preventing the wagons from leaving the intended route.

In 200 CE, Ma Jun built a south-pointing chariot, a vehicle with an early form of guidance system. The stagecoach, a four-wheeled vehicle drawn by horses, originated in 13th century England.

Railways began reappearing in Europe during the Late Middle Ages. The earliest known record of a railway in Europe from this period is a stained-glass window in the Minster of Freiburg im Breisgau dating from around 1350. In 1515, Cardinal Matthäus Lang wrote a description of the Reisszug, a funicular railway at the Hohensalzburg Fortress in Austria. The line originally used wooden rails and a hemp haulage rope and was operated by human or animal power, through a treadwheel. 1769: Nicolas-Joseph Cugnot is often credited with building the first self-propelled mechanical vehicle or automobile in 1769.

In Russia, in the 1780s, Ivan Kulibin developed a human-pedalled, three-wheeled carriage with modern features such as a flywheel, brake, gear box and bearings; however, it was not developed further.

In 1783, the Montgolfier brothers developed the first balloon vehicle.

In 1801, Richard Trevithick built and demonstrated his Puffing Devil road locomotive, which many believe was the first demonstration of a steam-powered road vehicle, though it could not maintain sufficient steam pressure for long periods and was of little practical use. In 1817, The Laufmaschine ("running machine"), invented by the German Baron Karl von Drais, became the first human means of transport to make use of the two-wheeler principle. It is regarded as the forerunner of the modern bicycle (and motorcycle). In 1885, Karl Benz built (and subsequently patented) the Benz Patent-Motorwagen, the first automobile, powered by his own four-stroke cycle gasoline engine.

In 1885, Otto Lilienthal began experimental gliding and achieved the first sustained, controlled, reproducible flights. In 1903, the Wright brothers flew the Wright Flyer, the first controlled, powered aircraft, in Kitty Hawk, North Carolina. In 1907, Gyroplane No.I became the first tethered rotorcraft to fly. The same year, the Cornu helicopter became the first rotorcraft to achieve free flight.

In 1928, Opel initiated the Opel-RAK program, the first large-scale rocket program. The Opel RAK.1 became the first rocket car; the following year, it also became the first rocket-powered aircraft. In 1961, the Soviet space program's Vostok 1 carried Yuri Gagarin into space. In 1969, NASA's Apollo 11 achieved the first Moon landing.

In 2010, the number of motor vehicles in operation worldwide surpassed 1 billion, roughly one for every seven people.

== Types of vehicles ==
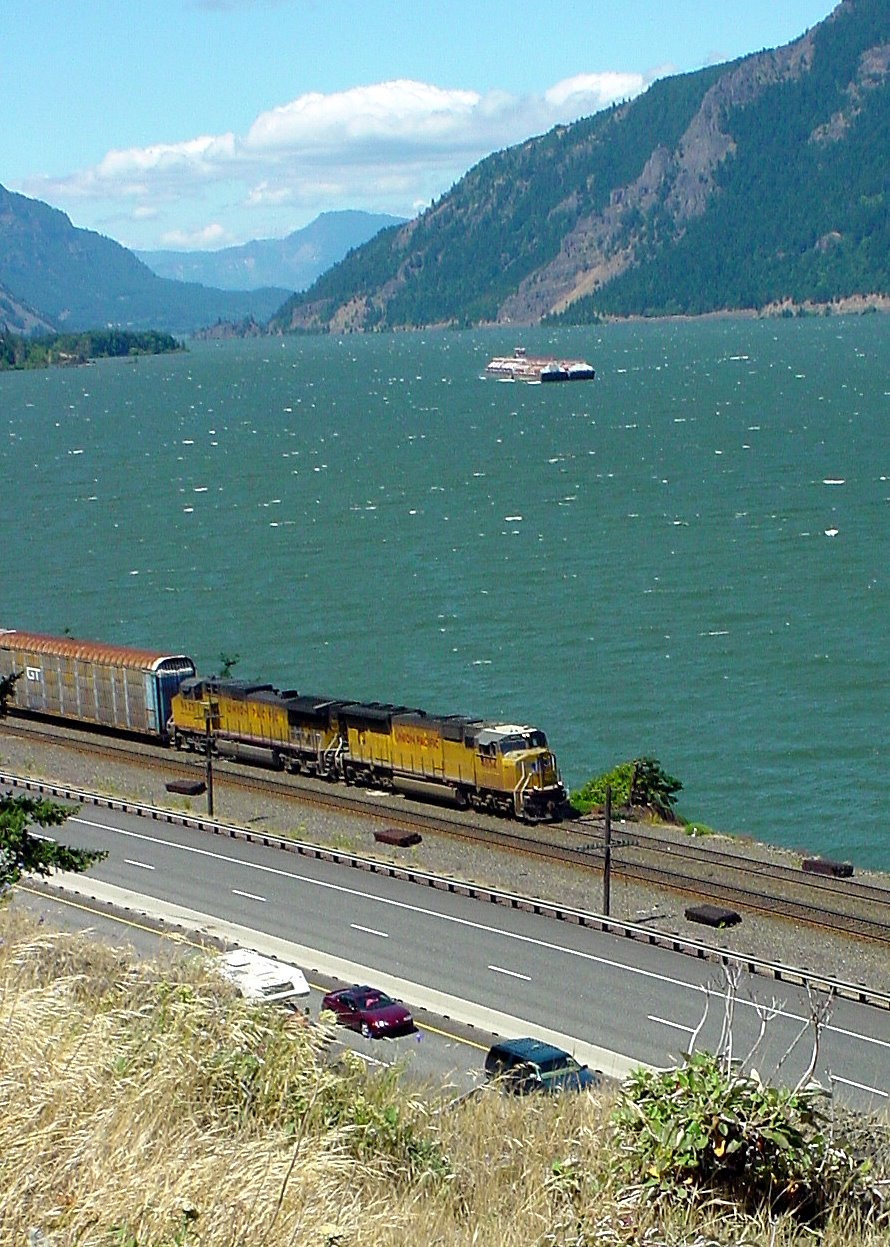
Cars, a train, and a boat traveling

There are over 1 billion bicycles in use worldwide. In 2002 there were an estimated 590 million cars and 205 million motorcycles in service in the world. At least 500 million Chinese Flying Pigeon bicycles have been made, more than any other single model of vehicle. The most-produced model of motor vehicle is the Honda Super Cub motorcycle, having sold 60 million units in 2008. The most-produced car model is the Toyota Corolla, with at least 35 million made by 2010. The most common fixed-wing airplane is the Cessna 172, with about 44,000 having been made as of 2017. The Soviet Mil Mi-8, at 17,000, is the most-produced helicopter. The top commercial jet airliner is the Boeing 737, at about 10,000 in 2018. At around 14,000 for both, the most produced trams are the KTM-5 and Tatra T3. The most common trolleybus is ZiU-9.

== Locomotion ==
Locomotion consists of a means that allows displacement with little opposition, a power source to provide the required kinetic energy and a means to control the motion, such as a brake and steering system. By far, most vehicles use wheels which employ the principle of rolling to enable displacement with very little rolling friction.

=== Energy source ===
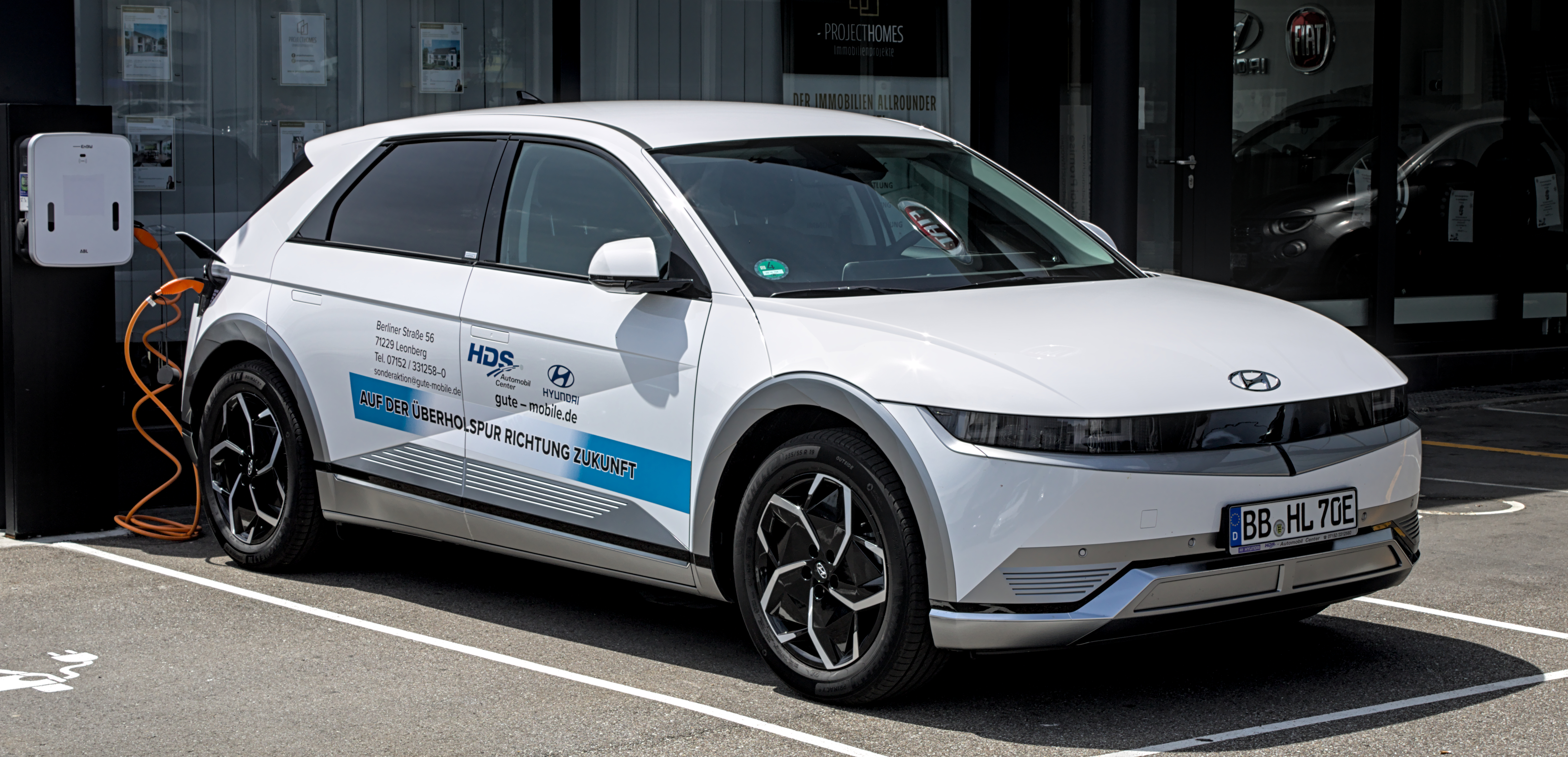
An electric car at a charging station

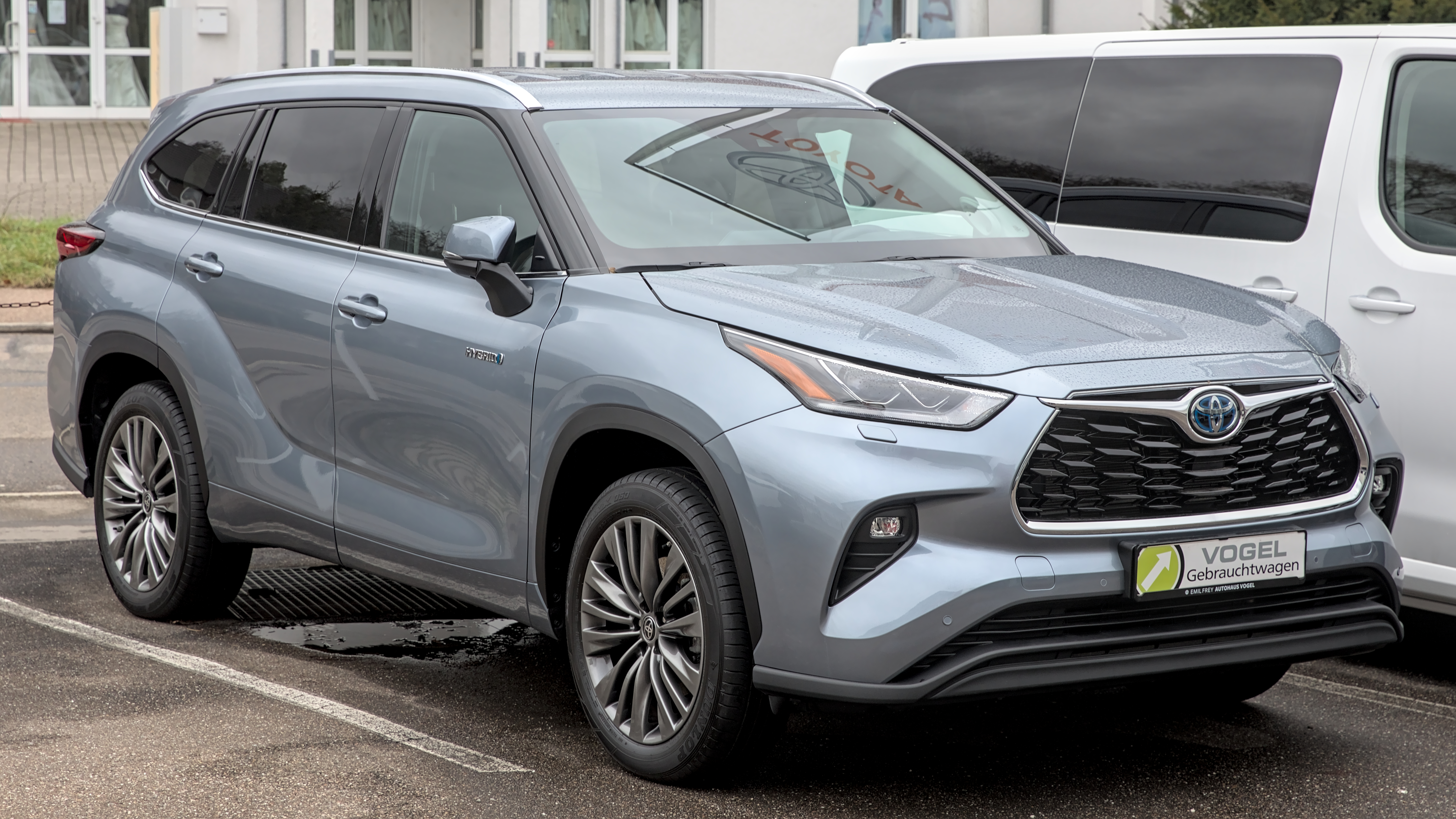
Toyota Highlander hybrid vehicle

A vehicle must have a source of energy to drive it. Energy can be extracted from external sources, as in the cases of a sailboat, a solar-powered car, or an electric streetcar that uses overhead lines. Energy can also be stored, provided it can be converted on demand and the storing medium's energy density and power density are sufficient to meet the vehicle's needs.

Human power is a simple source of energy that requires nothing more than humans. Despite the fact that humans cannot exceed 500 W (0.67 hp) for meaningful amounts of time, the land speed record for human-powered vehicles (unpaced) is 133 km/h (83 mph), as of 2009 on a recumbent bicycle.

The energy source used to power vehicles is fuel. External combustion engines can use almost anything that burns as fuel, whilst internal combustion engines and rocket engines are designed to burn a specific fuel, typically gasoline, diesel or ethanol. Food is the fuel used to power non-motor vehicles such as cycles, rickshaws and other pedestrian-controlled vehicles.

Another common medium for storing energy is batteries, which have the advantages of being responsive, useful in a wide range of power levels, environmentally friendly, efficient, simple to install, and easy to maintain. Batteries also facilitate the use of electric motors, which have their own advantages. On the other hand, batteries have low energy densities, short service life, poor performance at extreme temperatures, long charging times, and difficulties with disposal (although they can usually be recycled). Like fuel, batteries store chemical energy and can cause burns and poisoning in event of an accident. Batteries also lose effectiveness with time. The issue of charge time can be resolved by swapping discharged batteries with charged ones; however, this incurs additional hardware costs and may be impractical for larger batteries. Moreover, there must be standard batteries for battery swapping to work at a gas station. Fuel cells are similar to batteries in that they convert from chemical to electrical energy, but have their own advantages and disadvantages.

Electrified rails and overhead cables are a common source of electrical energy on subways, railways, trams, and trolleybuses. Solar energy is a more modern development, and several solar vehicles have been successfully built and tested, including Helios, a solar-powered aircraft.

Nuclear power is a more exclusive form of energy storage, currently limited to large ships and submarines, mostly military. Nuclear energy can be released by a nuclear reactor, nuclear battery, or repeatedly detonating nuclear bombs. There have been two experiments with nuclear-powered aircraft, the Tupolev Tu-119 and the Convair X-6.

Mechanical strain is another method of storing energy, whereby an elastic band or metal spring is deformed and releases energy as it is allowed to return to its ground state. Systems employing elastic materials suffer from hysteresis, and metal springs are too dense to be useful in many cases.

Flywheels store energy in a spinning mass. Because a light and fast rotor is energetically favorable, flywheels can pose a significant safety hazard. Moreover, flywheels leak energy fairly quickly and affect a vehicle's steering through the gyroscopic effect. They have been used experimentally in gyrobuses.

Wind energy is used by sailboats and land yachts as the primary source of energy. It is very cheap and fairly easy to use, the main issues being dependence on weather and upwind performance. Balloons also rely on the wind to move horizontally. Aircraft flying in the jet stream may get a boost from high altitude winds.

Compressed gas is currently an experimental method of storing energy. In this case, compressed gas is simply stored in a tank and released when necessary. Like elastics, they have hysteresis losses when gas heats up during compression.

Gravitational potential energy is a form of energy used in gliders, skis, bobsleds and numerous other vehicles that go downhill. Regenerative braking is an example of capturing kinetic energy where the brakes of a vehicle are augmented with a generator or other means of extracting energy.

=== Motors and engines ===
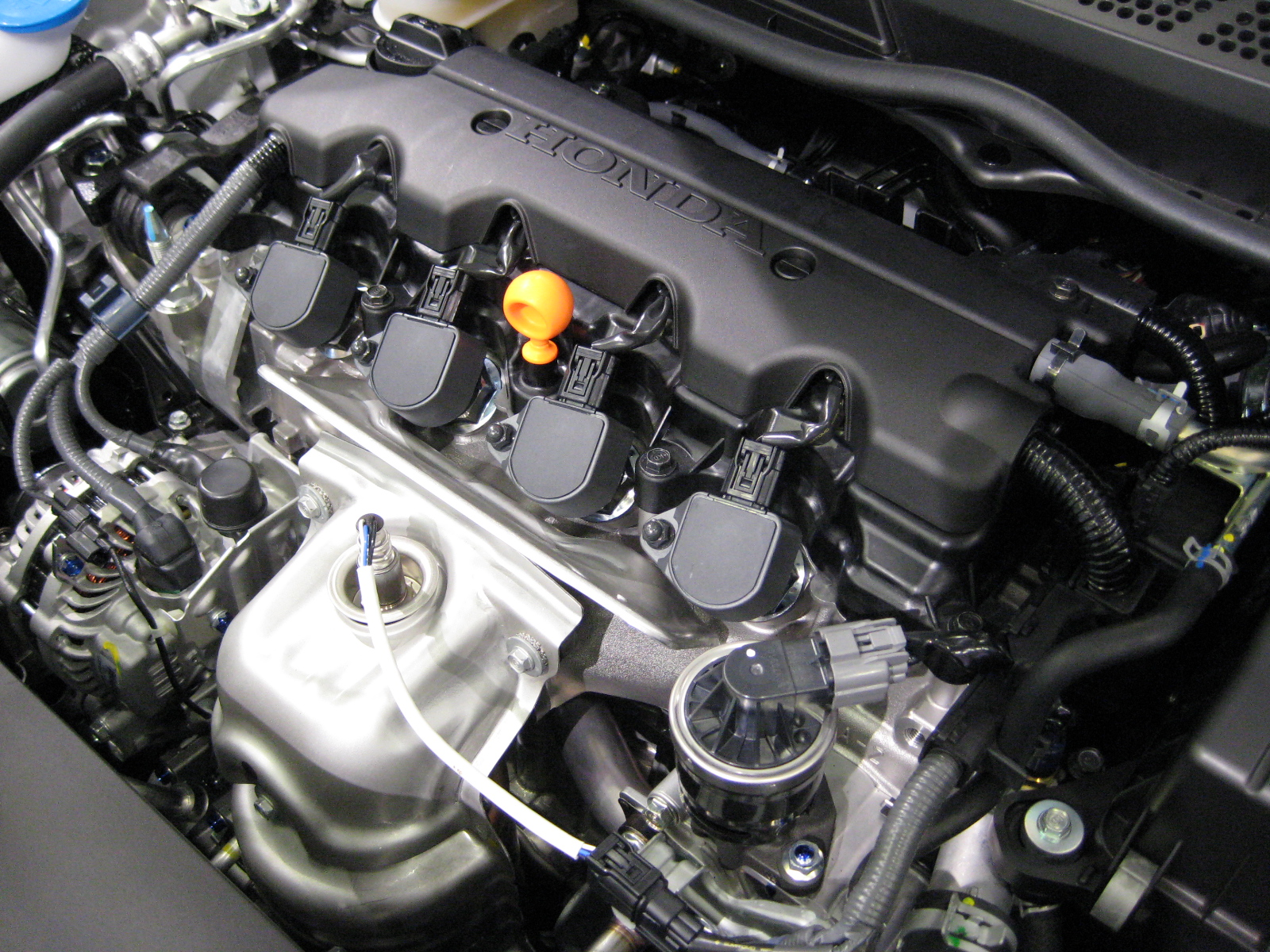
A Honda R18A engine in a 2007 Honda Civic

When needed, the energy is taken from the source and consumed by one or more motors or engines. Sometimes there is an intermediate medium, such as the batteries of a diesel submarine.

Most motor vehicles have internal combustion engines. They are fairly cheap, easy to maintain, reliable, safe and small. Since these engines burn fuel, they have long ranges but pollute the environment. A related engine is the external combustion engine. An example of this is the steam engine. Aside from fuel, steam engines also need water, making them impractical for some purposes. Steam engines also need time to warm up, whereas IC engines can usually run right after being started, although this may not be recommended in cold conditions. Steam engines burning coal release sulfur into the air, causing harmful acid rain.

While intermittent internal combustion engines were once the primary means of aircraft propulsion, they have been largely superseded by continuous internal combustion engines, such as gas turbines. Turbine engines are light and, particularly when used on aircraft, efficient. On the other hand, they cost more and require careful maintenance. They can also be damaged by ingesting foreign objects, and they produce a hot exhaust. Trains using turbines are called gas turbine-electric locomotives. Examples of surface vehicles using turbines are M1 Abrams, MTT Turbine SUPERBIKE and the Millennium. Pulse jet engines are similar in many ways to turbojets but have almost no moving parts. For this reason, they were very appealing to vehicle designers in the past; however, their noise, heat, and inefficiency have led to their abandonment. A historical example of the use of a pulse jet was the V-1 flying bomb. Pulse jets are still occasionally used in amateur experiments. With the advent of modern technology, the pulse detonation engine has become practical and was successfully tested on a Rutan VariEze. While the pulse detonation engine is much more efficient than the pulse jet and even turbine engines, it still suffers from extreme noise and vibration levels. Ramjets also have few moving parts, but they only work at high speed, so their use is restricted to tip jet helicopters and high speed aircraft such as the Lockheed SR-71 Blackbird.

Rocket engines are primarily used on rockets, rocket sleds and experimental aircraft. Rocket engines are extremely powerful. The heaviest vehicle ever to leave the ground, the Saturn V rocket, was powered by five F-1 rocket engines generating a combined 180 million horsepower (134.2 gigawatt). Rocket engines also do not need to "push off" anything, a fact that the New York Times denied in error. Rocket engines can be particularly simple, sometimes consisting of nothing more than a catalyst, as in the case of a hydrogen peroxide rocket. This makes them an attractive option for vehicles such as jet packs. Despite their simplicity, rocket engines are often dangerous and susceptible to explosions. The fuel they run off may be flammable, poisonous, corrosive or cryogenic. They also suffer from poor efficiency. For these reasons, rocket engines are only used when absolutely necessary.

Electric motors are used in electric vehicles such as electric bicycles, electric scooters, small boats, subways, trains, trolleybuses, trams and experimental aircraft. Electric motors can be very efficient: over 90% efficiency is common. Electric motors can also be built to be powerful, reliable, low-maintenance and of any size. Electric motors can deliver a range of speeds and torques without necessarily using a gearbox (although it may be more economical to use one). Electric motors are limited in their use chiefly by the difficulty of supplying electricity.

Compressed gas motors have been used on some vehicles experimentally. They are simple, efficient, safe, cheap, reliable and operate in a variety of conditions. One of the difficulties met when using gas motors is the cooling effect of expanding gas. These engines are limited by how quickly they absorb heat from their surroundings. The cooling effect can, however, double as air conditioning. Compressed gas motors also lose effectiveness with falling gas pressure.

Ion thrusters are used on some satellites and spacecraft. They are only effective in a vacuum, which limits their use to spaceborne vehicles. Ion thrusters run primarily off electricity, but they also need a propellant such as caesium, or, more recently xenon. Ion thrusters can achieve extremely high speeds and use little propellant; however, they are power-hungry.

=== Converting energy to work ===
The mechanical energy that motors and engines produce must be converted to work by wheels, propellers, nozzles, or similar means. Aside from converting mechanical energy into motion, wheels allow a vehicle to roll along a surface and, with the exception of railed vehicles, to be steered. Wheels are ancient technology, with specimens being discovered from over 5000 years ago. Wheels are used in a plethora of vehicles, including motor vehicles, armoured personnel carriers, amphibious vehicles, airplanes, trains, skateboards and wheelbarrows.

Nozzles are used in conjunction with almost all reaction engines. Vehicles using nozzles include jet aircraft, rockets, and personal watercraft. While most nozzles take the shape of a cone or bell, some unorthodox designs have been created such as the aerospike. Some nozzles are intangible, such as the electromagnetic field nozzle of a vectored ion thruster.

Continuous track is sometimes used instead of wheels to power land vehicles. Continuous track has the advantages of a larger contact area, easy repairs on small damage, and high maneuverability. Examples of vehicles using continuous tracks are tanks, snowmobiles and excavators. Two continuous tracks used together allow for steering. The largest land vehicle in the world, the Bagger 293, is propelled by continuous tracks.

Propellers (as well as screws, fans and rotors) are used to move through a fluid. Propellers have been used as toys since ancient times; however, it was Leonardo da Vinci who devised what was one of the earliest propeller driven vehicles, the "aerial-screw". In 1661, Toogood & Hays adopted the screw for use as a ship propeller. Since then, the propeller has been tested on many terrestrial vehicles, including the Schienenzeppelin train and numerous cars. In modern times, propellers are most prevalent on watercraft and aircraft, as well as some amphibious vehicles such as hovercraft and ground-effect vehicles. Intuitively, propellers cannot work in space as there is no working fluid; however, some sources have suggested that since space is never empty, a propeller could be made to work in space.

Similarly to propeller vehicles, some vehicles use wings for propulsion. Sailboats and sailplanes are propelled by the forward component of lift generated by their sails/wings. Ornithopters also produce thrust aerodynamically. Ornithopters with large rounded leading edges produce lift by leading-edge suction forces. Research at the University of Toronto Institute for Aerospace Studies lead to a flight with an actual ornithopter on July 31, 2010.

Paddle wheels are used on some older watercraft and their reconstructions. These ships were known as paddle steamers. Because paddle wheels simply push against the water, their design and construction is very simple. The oldest such ship in scheduled service is the Skibladner. Many pedalo boats also use paddle wheels for propulsion.

Screw-propelled vehicles are propelled by auger-like cylinders fitted with helical flanges. Because they can produce thrust on both land and water, they are commonly used on all-terrain vehicles. The ZiL-2906 was a Soviet-designed screw-propelled vehicle designed to retrieve cosmonauts from the Siberian wilderness.

=== Friction ===
All or almost all of the useful energy produced by the engine is usually dissipated as friction; so minimizing frictional losses is very important in many vehicles. The main sources of friction are rolling friction and fluid drag (air drag or water drag).

Wheels have low bearing friction, and pneumatic tires give low rolling friction. Steel wheels on steel tracks are lower still.

Aerodynamic drag can be reduced by streamlined design features.

Friction is desirable and important in supplying traction to facilitate motion on land. Most land vehicles rely on friction for accelerating, decelerating and changing direction. Sudden reductions in traction can cause loss of control and accidents.

== Control ==
=== Steering ===
Most vehicles, with the notable exception of railed vehicles, have at least one steering mechanism. Wheeled vehicles steer by angling their front or rear wheels. The B-52 Stratofortress has a special arrangement in which all four main wheels can be angled. Skids can also be used to steer by angling them, as in the case of a snowmobile. Ships, boats, submarines, dirigibles and aeroplanes usually have a rudder for steering. On an airplane, ailerons are used to bank the airplane for directional control, sometimes assisted by the rudder.

=== Stopping ===
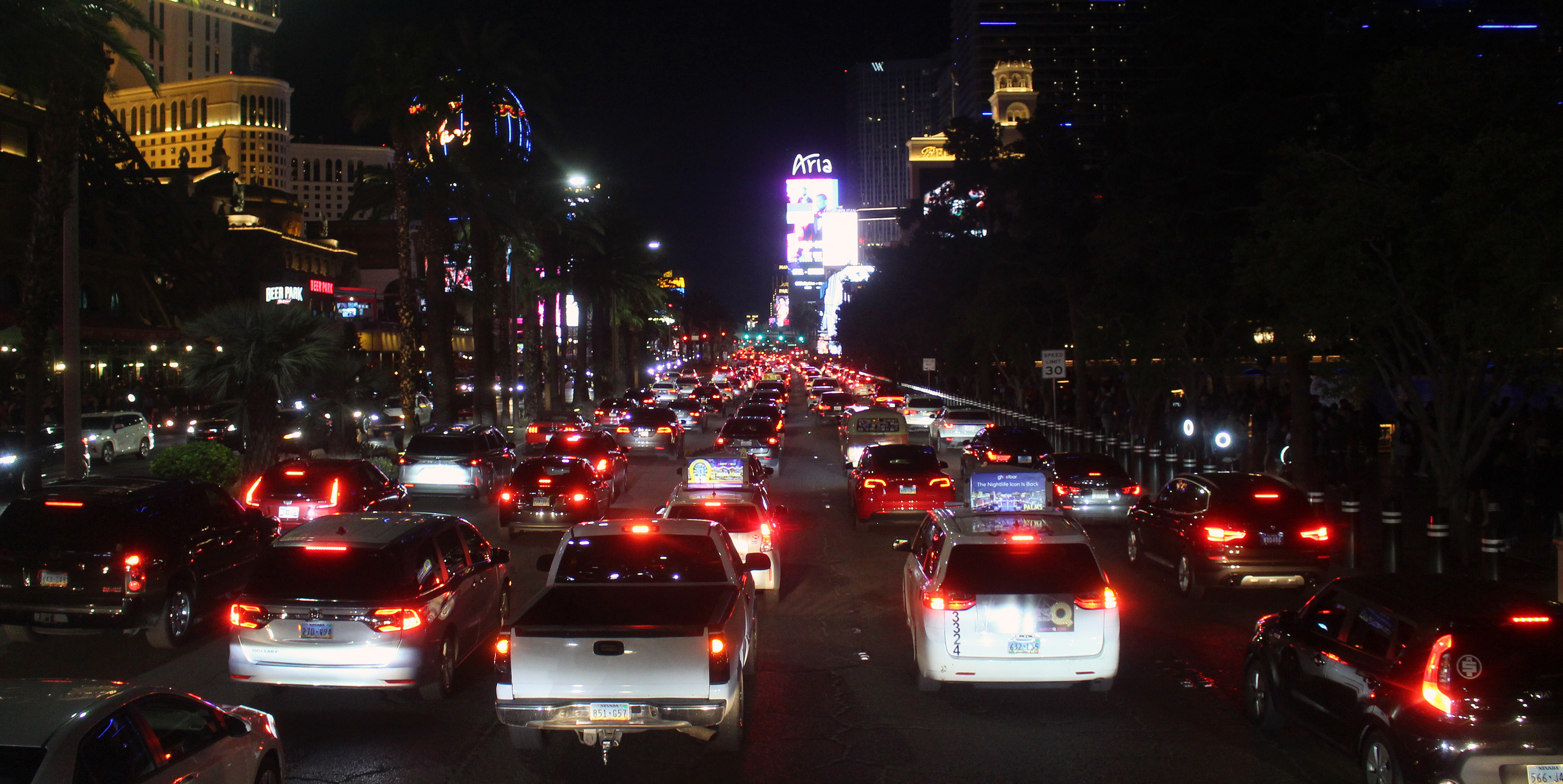
Cars stopping in traffic on the Las Vegas Strip in 2023

With no power applied, most vehicles come to a stop due to friction. But it is often required to stop a vehicle faster than by friction alone, so almost all vehicles are equipped with a braking system. Wheeled vehicles are typically equipped with friction brakes, which use the friction between brake pads (stators) and brake rotors to slow the vehicle. Many airplanes have high-performance versions of the same system in their landing gear for use on the ground. A Boeing 757 brake, for example, has 3 stators and 4 rotors. The Space Shuttle also uses frictional brakes on its wheels. As well as frictional brakes, hybrid and electric cars, trolleybuses and electric bicycles can also use regenerative brakes to recycle some of the vehicle's potential energy. High-speed trains sometimes use frictionless Eddy-current brakes; however, widespread application of the technology has been limited by overheating and interference issues.

Aside from landing gear brakes, most large aircraft have other ways of decelerating. In aircraft, air brakes are aerodynamic surfaces that provide braking force by increasing the frontal cross section, thus increasing the aerodynamic drag of the aircraft. These are usually implemented as flaps that oppose air flow when extended and are flush with the aircraft when retracted. Reverse thrust is also used in many aeroplane engines. Propeller aircraft achieve reverse thrust by reversing the pitch of the propellers, while jet aircraft do so by redirecting their engine exhausts forward. On aircraft carriers, arresting gears are used to stop an aircraft. Pilots may even apply full forward throttle on touchdown, in case the arresting gear does not catch and a go around is needed.

Parachutes are used to slow down vehicles travelling very fast. Parachutes have been used in land, air and space vehicles such as the ThrustSSC, Eurofighter Typhoon and Apollo Command Module. Some older Soviet passenger jets had braking parachutes for emergency landings. Boats use similar devices called sea anchors to maintain stability in rough seas.

To further increase the rate of deceleration or where the brakes have failed, several mechanisms can be used to stop a vehicle. Cars and rolling stock usually have hand brakes that, while designed to secure an already parked vehicle, can provide limited braking should the primary brakes fail. A secondary procedure called forward-slip is sometimes used to slow airplanes by flying at an angle, causing more drag.

== Legislation ==
Motor vehicle and trailer categories are defined according to the following international classification:

- Category M: passenger vehicles.
- Category N: motor vehicles for the carriage of goods.
- Category O: trailers and semi-trailers.

=== European Union ===
In the European Union the classifications for vehicle types are defined by:

- Commission Directive 2001/116/EC of 20 December 2001, adapting to technical progress Council Directive 70/156/EEC on the approximation of the laws of the Member States relating to the type-approval of motor vehicles and their trailers
- Directive 2002/24/EC of the European Parliament and of the Council of 18 March 2002 relating to the type-approval of two or three wheeled motor vehicles and repealing Council Directive 92/61/EEC

European Community is based on the Community's WVTA (whole vehicle type-approval) system. Under this system, manufacturers can obtain certification for a vehicle type in one Member State if it meets the EC technical requirements and then market it EU-wide with no need for further tests. Total technical harmonization already has been achieved in three vehicle categories (passenger cars, motorcycles, and tractors) and soon will extend to other vehicle categories (coaches and utility vehicles). European car manufacturers must be ensured access to as large a market as possible.

While the Community type-approval system allows manufacturers to fully benefit fully from internal market opportunities, worldwide technical harmonization in the context of the United Nations Economic Commission for Europe (UNECE) offers a market beyond European borders.

=== Licensing ===
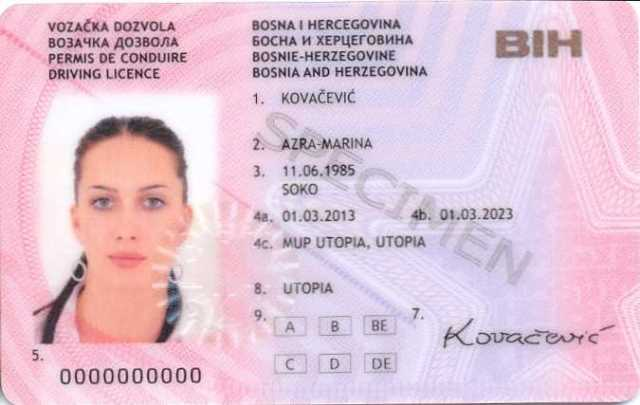
Driver's licence

In many cases, it is unlawful to operate a vehicle without a license or certification. The least strict form of regulation usually limits what passengers the driver may carry or prohibits them completely (e.g., a Canadian ultralight license without endorsements). The next level of licensing may allow passengers, but without any form of compensation or payment. A private driver's license usually has these conditions. Commercial licenses that allow the transport of passengers and cargo are more tightly regulated. The most strict form of licensing is generally reserved for school buses, hazardous materials transports and emergency vehicles.

The driver of a motor vehicle is typically required to hold a valid driver's license while driving on public lands, whereas the pilot of an aircraft must have a license at all times, regardless of where in the jurisdiction the aircraft is flying.

=== Registration ===
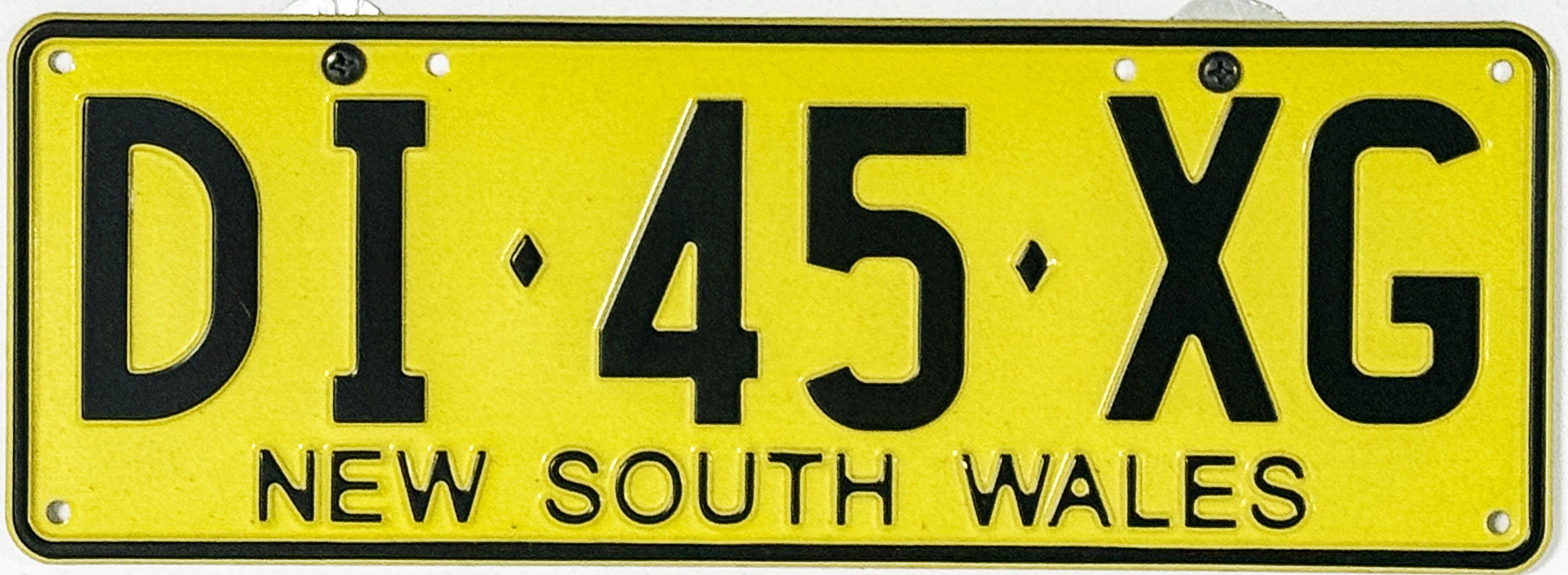
New South Wales licence plate

Vehicles are often required to be registered. Registration may be for purely legal reasons, for insurance reasons, or to help law enforcement recover stolen vehicles. The Toronto Police Service, for example, offers free and optional bicycle registration online. On motor vehicles, registration often takes the form of a vehicle registration plate, which makes it easy to identify a vehicle. In Russia, trucks and buses have their licence plate numbers repeated in large black letters on the back. On aircraft, a similar system is used, where a tail number is painted on various surfaces. Like motor vehicles and aircraft, watercraft also have registration numbers in most jurisdictions; however, the vessel name is still the primary means of identification as has been the case since ancient times. For this reason, duplicate registration names are generally rejected. In Canada, boats with an engine power of 10 hp (7.5 kW) or greater require registration, leading to the ubiquitous "9.9 hp (7.4 kW)" engine.

Registration may be conditional on the vehicle being approved for use on public highways, as in the case of the UK and Ontario. Many U.S. states also have requirements for vehicles operating on public highways. Aircraft have more stringent requirements, as they pose a high risk of damage to people and property in the event of an accident. In the U.S., the FAA requires aircraft to have an airworthiness certificate. Because U.S. aircraft must be flown for some time before they are certified, there is a provision for an experimental airworthiness certificate. FAA experimental aircraft are restricted in operation, including no overflights of populated areas, in busy airspace, or with unessential passengers. Materials and parts used in FAA certified aircraft must meet the criteria set forth by the technical standard orders.

=== Mandatory safety equipment ===
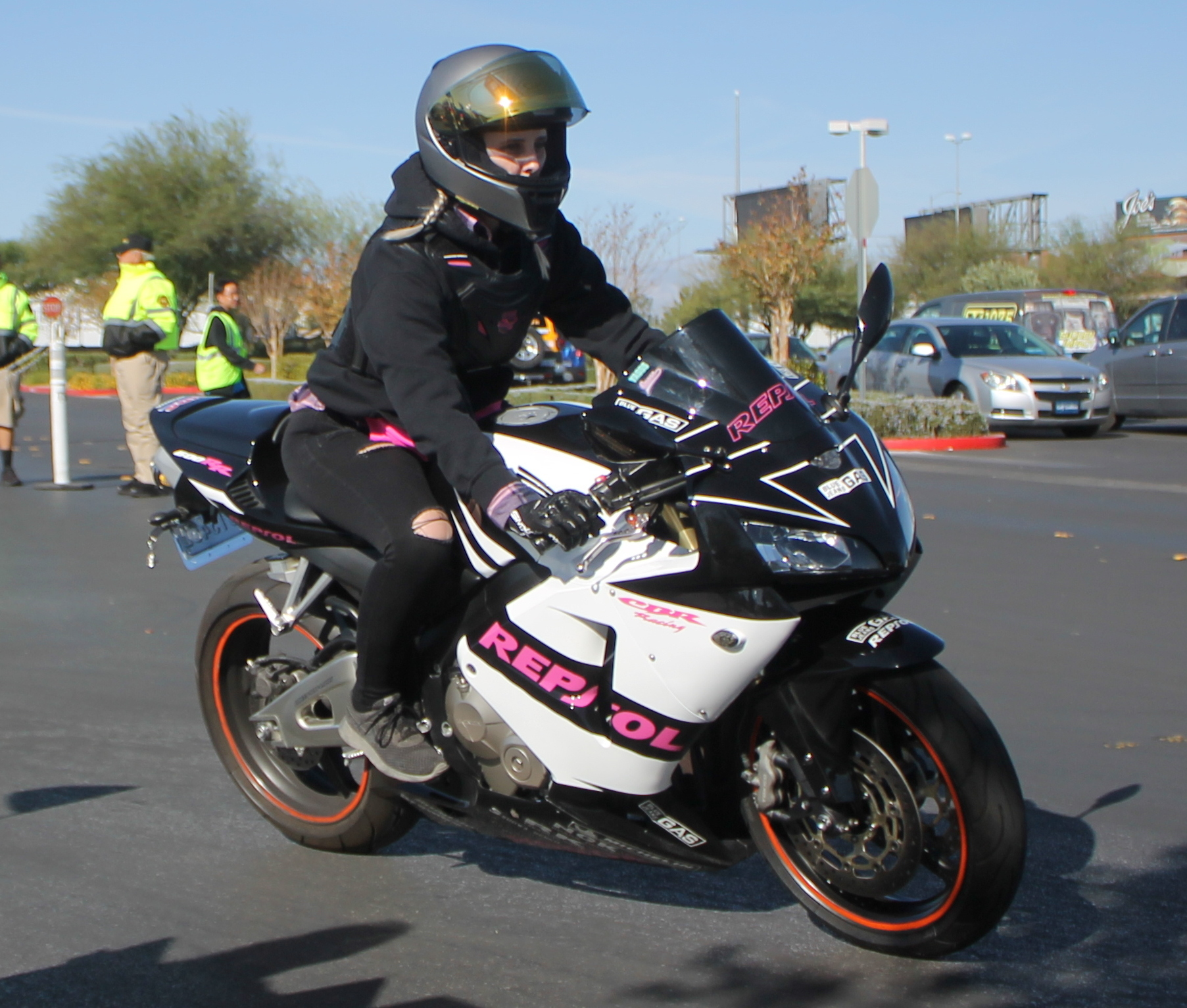
Wearing a helmet while riding a motorcycle

In many jurisdictions, the operator of a vehicle is legally obligated to carry safety equipment with or on them. Common examples include seat belts in cars, helmets on motorcycles and bicycles, fire extinguishers on boats, buses and airplanes, and life jackets on boats and commercial aircraft. Passenger aircraft carry a great deal of safety equipment, including inflatable slides, rafts, oxygen masks, oxygen tanks, life jackets, satellite beacons and first aid kits. Some equipment, such as life jackets has led to debate regarding their usefulness. In the case of Ethiopian Airlines Flight 961, the life jackets saved many people but also led to many deaths when passengers inflated their vests prematurely.

== Right-of-way ==
There are specific real-estate arrangements made to allow vehicles to travel from one place to another. The most common arrangements are public highways, where appropriately licensed vehicles can navigate without hindrance. These highways are on public land and are maintained by the government. Similarly, toll routes are open to the public after paying a toll. These routes and the land they rest on may be government-owned, privately owned or a combination of both. Some routes are privately owned but grant access to the public. These routes often have a warning sign stating that the government does not maintain them. An example of this are byways in England and Wales. In Scotland, land is open to unmotorized vehicles if it meets certain criteria. Public land is sometimes open to use by off-road vehicles. On U.S. public land, the Bureau of Land Management (BLM) decides where vehicles may be used.

Railways often pass over land not owned by the railway company. The right to this land is granted to the railway company through mechanisms such as easement. Watercraft are generally allowed to navigate public waters without restriction as long as they do not cause a disturbance. Passing through a lock, however, may require paying a toll.

Despite the common law tradition Cuius est solum, eius est usque ad coelum et ad inferos of owning all the air above one's property, the U.S. Supreme Court ruled that aircraft in the U.S. have the right to use air above someone else's property without their consent. While the same rule generally applies in all jurisdictions, some countries, such as Cuba and Russia, have taken advantage of air rights on a national level to earn money. There are some areas that aircraft are barred from overflying. This is called prohibited airspace. Prohibited airspace is usually strictly enforced due to potential damage from espionage or attack. In the case of Korean Air Lines Flight 007, the airliner entered prohibited airspace over Soviet territory and was shot down as it was leaving.

== Safety ==
Several different metrics used to compare and evaluate the safety of different vehicles. The main three are deaths per billion passenger-journeys, deaths per billion passenger-hours and deaths per billion passenger-kilometers.

== See also ==
- Automotive acronyms and abbreviations
- ISIRI 6924
- Narrow-track vehicle
- Outline of vehicles
- Personal transporter
- Propulsion
- Single-track vehicle
- Vehicular dynamics
- Vehicular metrics
