= Narrow-track vehicle =

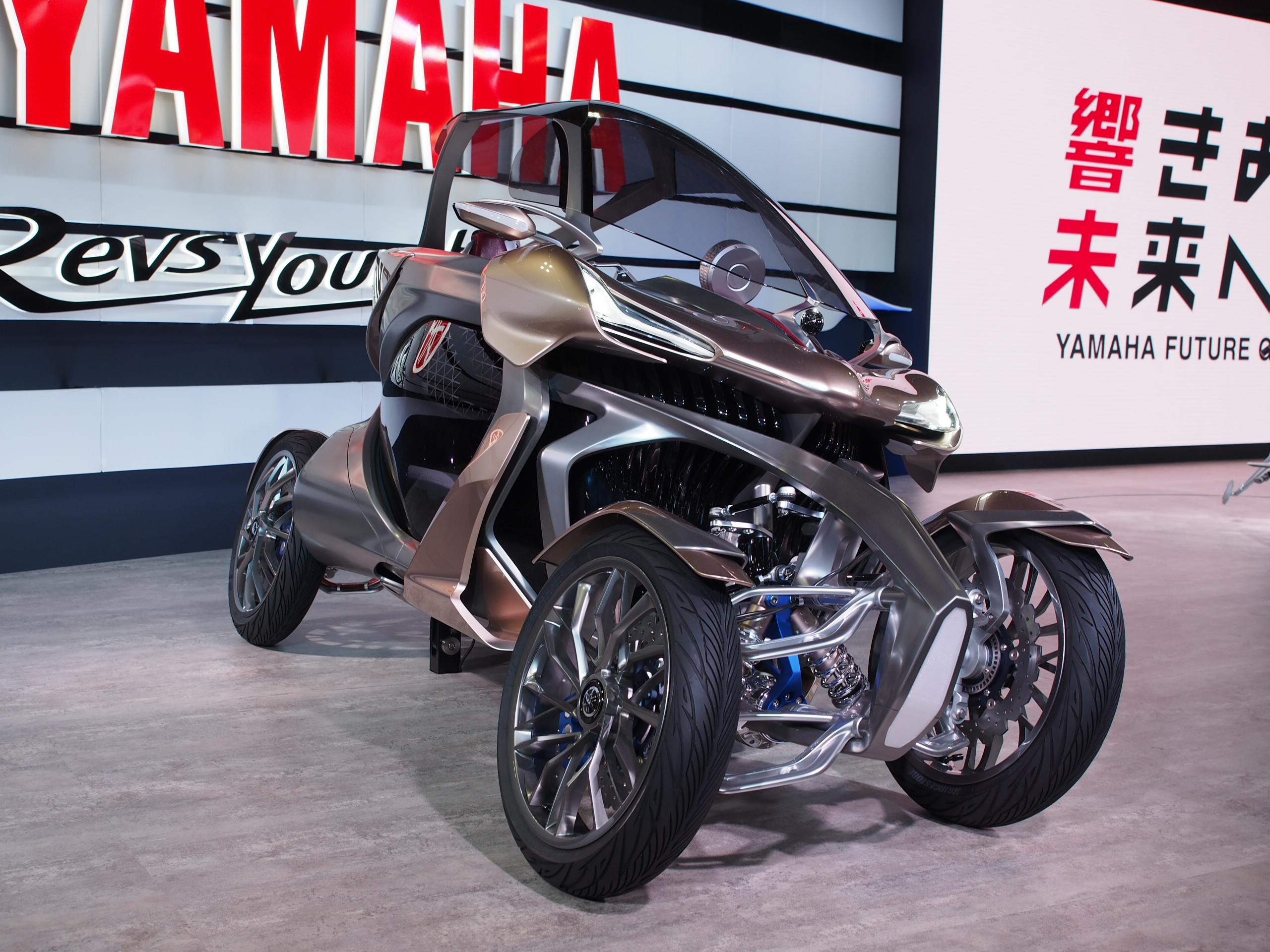
Yamaha MWC-4

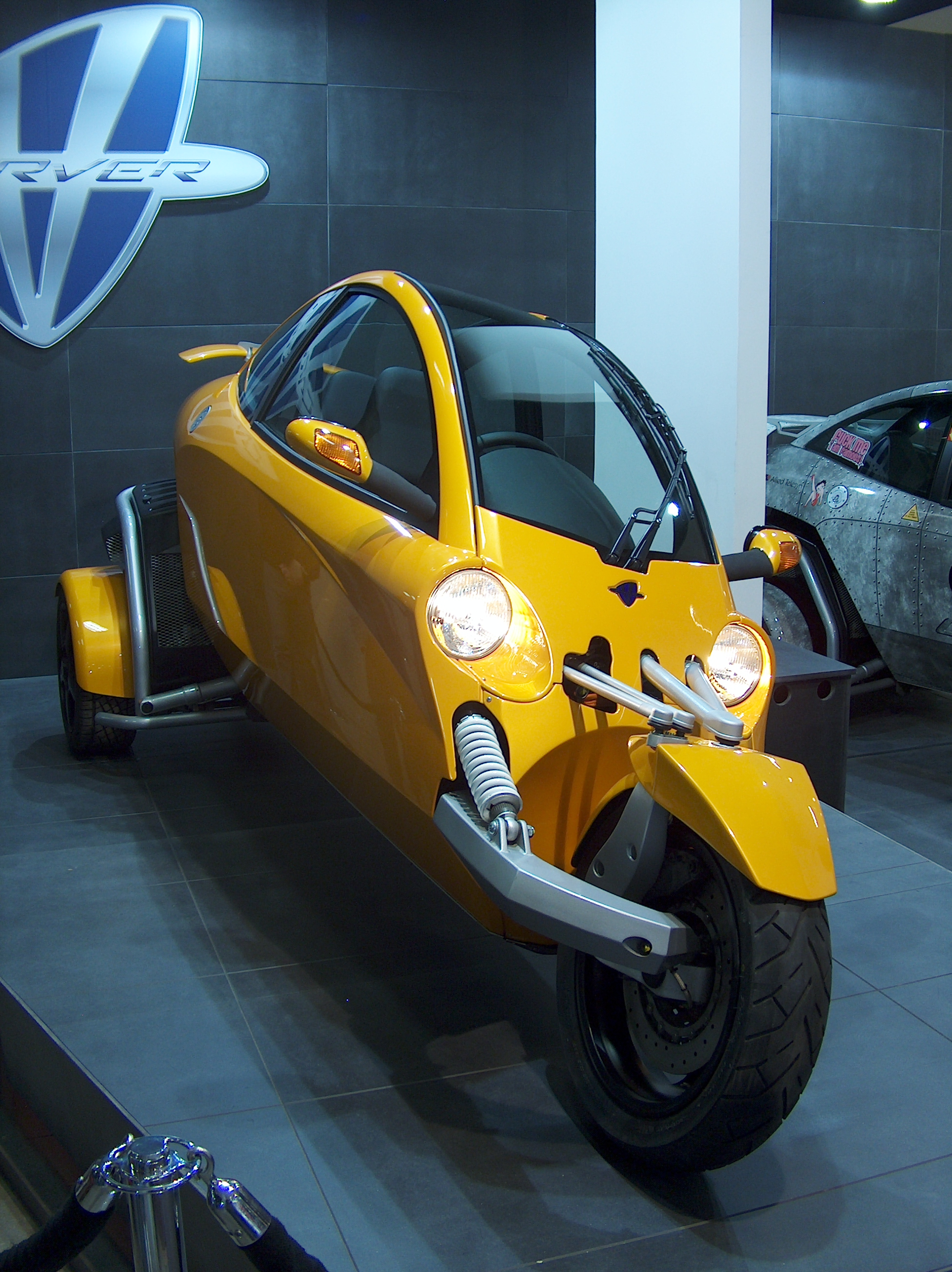
Vandenbrink Carver

A narrow-track vehicle is a vehicle that leaves a narrow ground track as it moves forward. Narrow-track vehicles may have lateral stability when stationary but usually lean into turns to prevent falling towards the outside.

Narrow-track vehicles have unique dynamics that, in the case of wheeled vehicles, may be similar to bicycle and motorcycle dynamics and that may include countersteering. Narrow-track vehicles can roll on wheels, slide, float, or hydroplane. The narrow profile can result in reduced aerodynamic drag, increased fuel efficiency, and reduced pavement requirements. These types of vehicles have also been described as "man-wide vehicles" (MWV).

Generally, cars with a static stability factor ($\frac{T_w}{2h}$ where $T_w$ = car width and $h$ = height of the center of gravity) of less than 0.6 are considered to be narrow cars due to physical reasons. Non-narrow vehicles (those with a higher static stability factor) are more safe against rolling over while turning because they begin to skid before they can undergo enough turning acceleration to roll over; however, this is not always true for narrow vehicles.

== Gallery ==
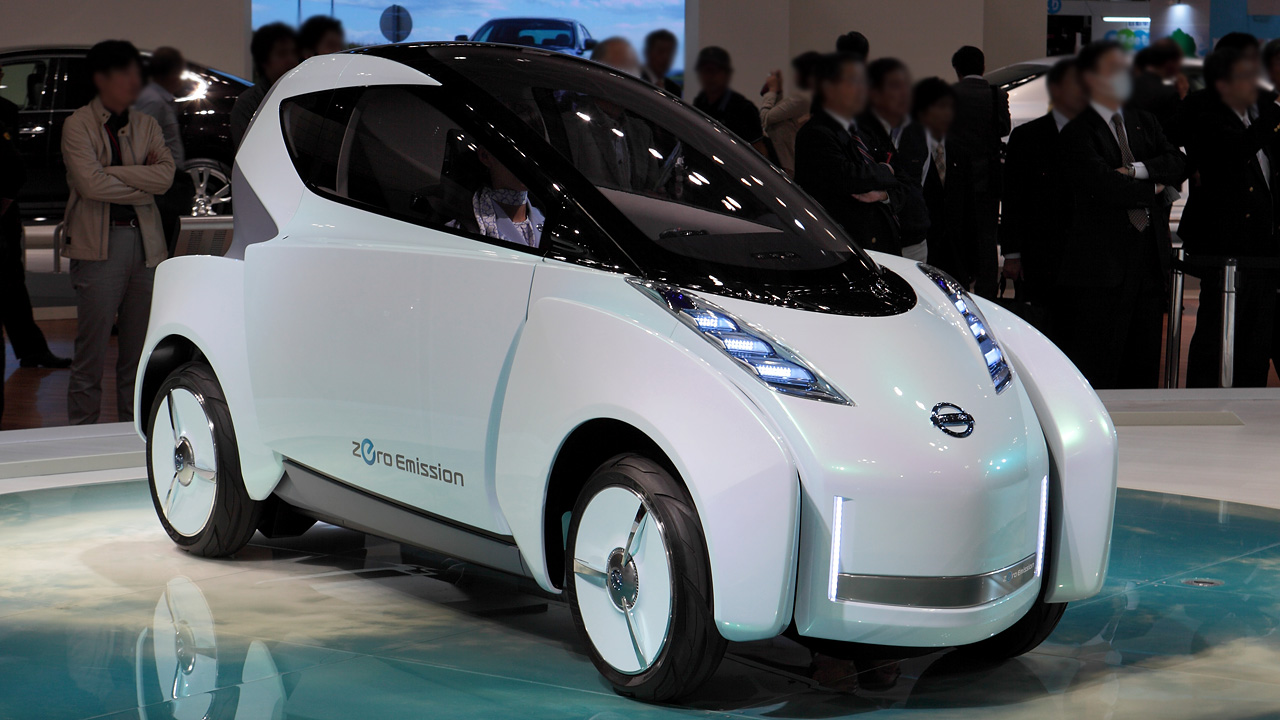
Nissan Land Glider

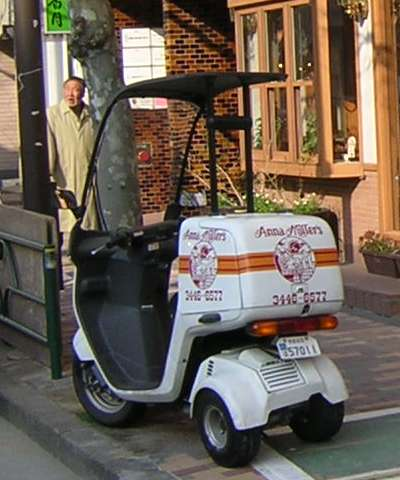
Honda Canopy

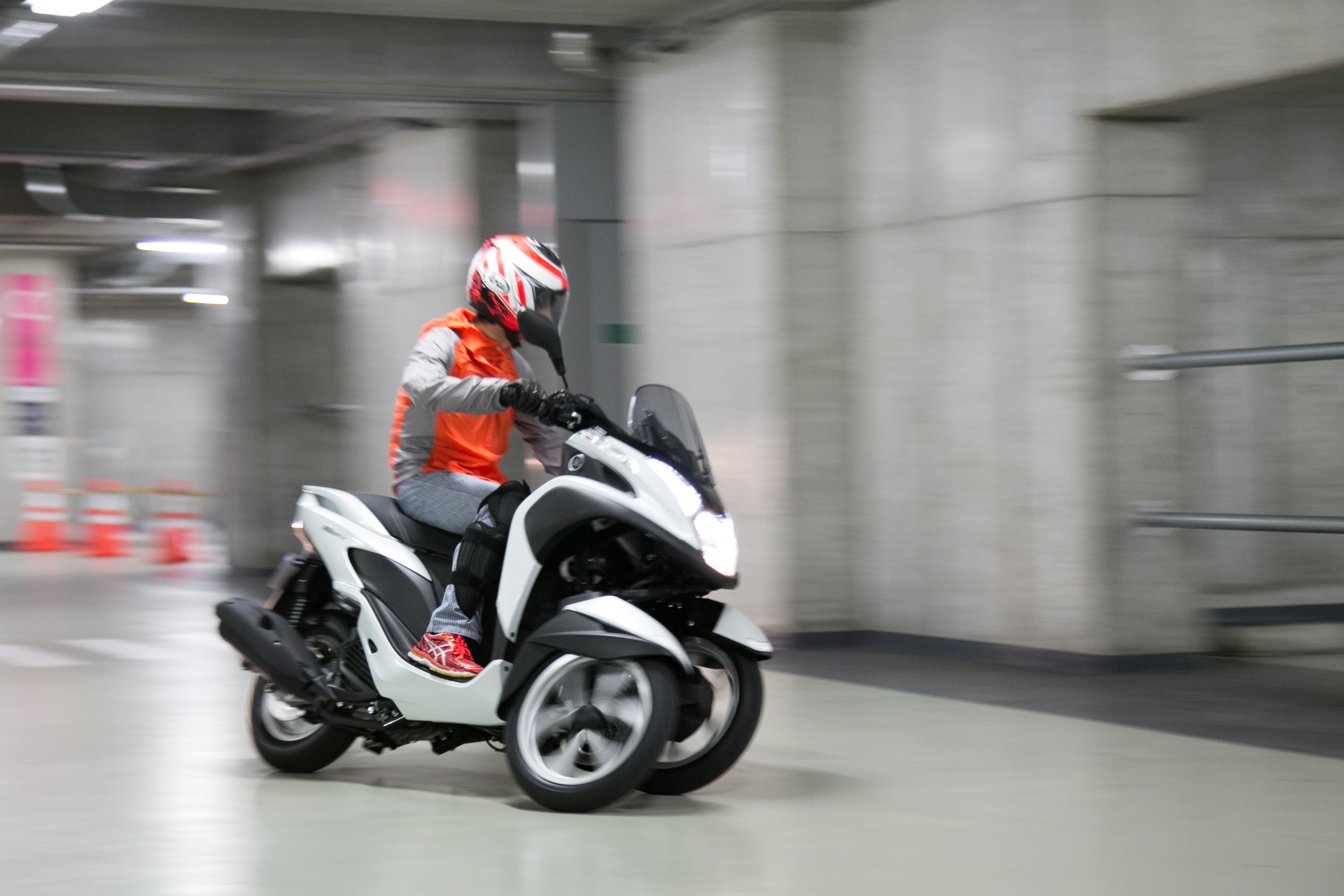
Yamaha Tricity

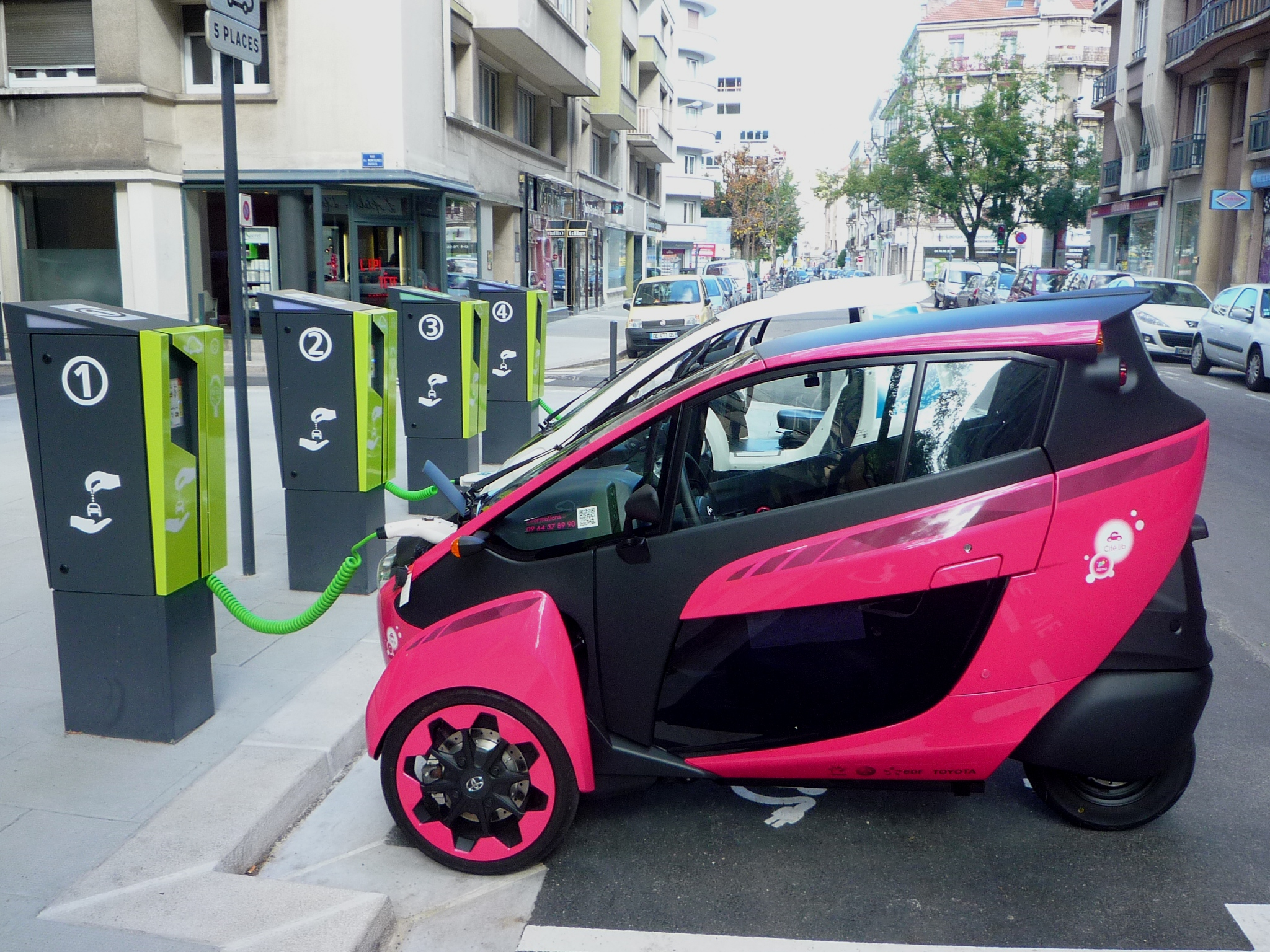
Toyota i-Road

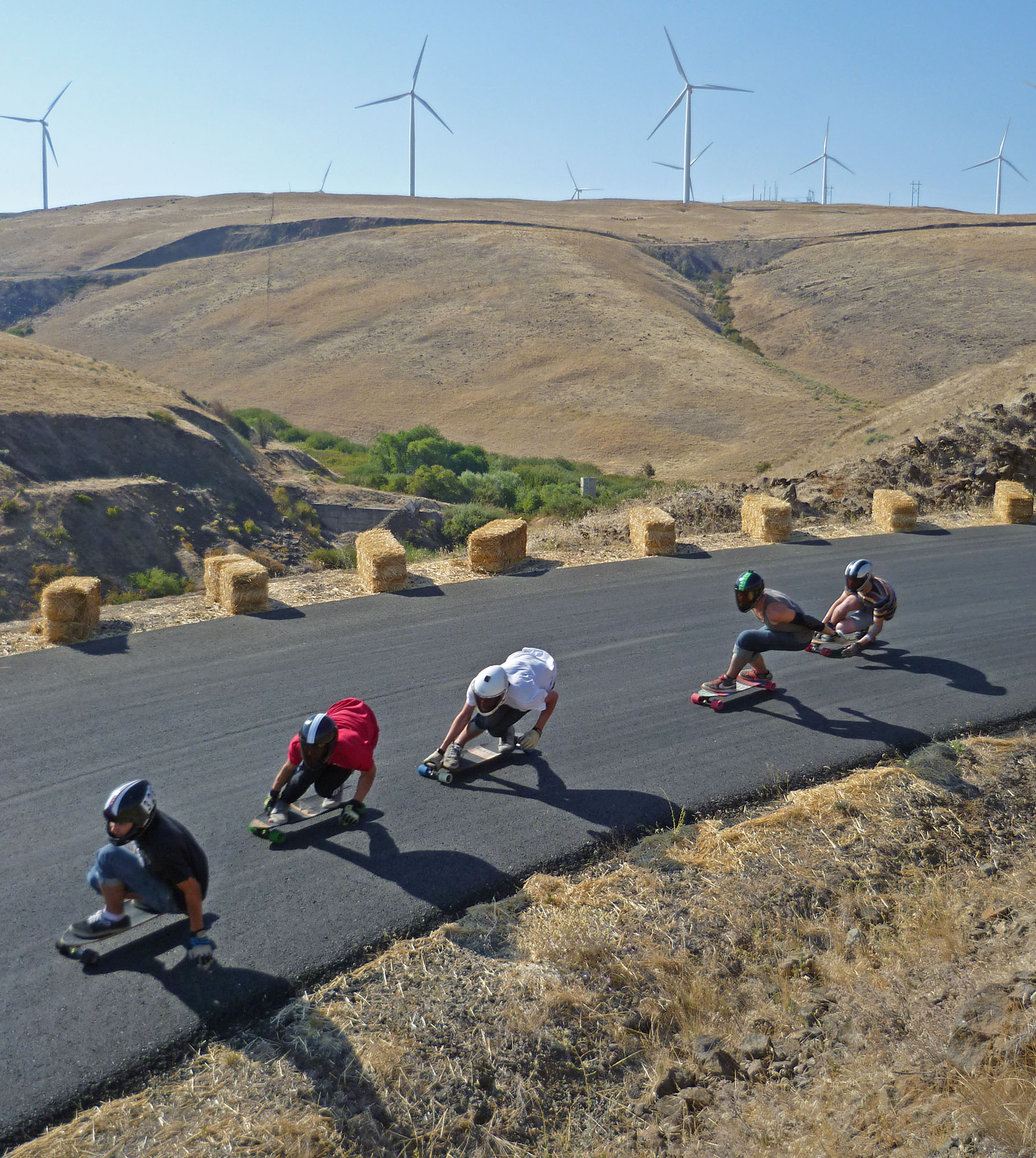
Longboarding

== See also ==
- Tilting three-wheeler
- Tilting car
