= Nissan Land Glider =

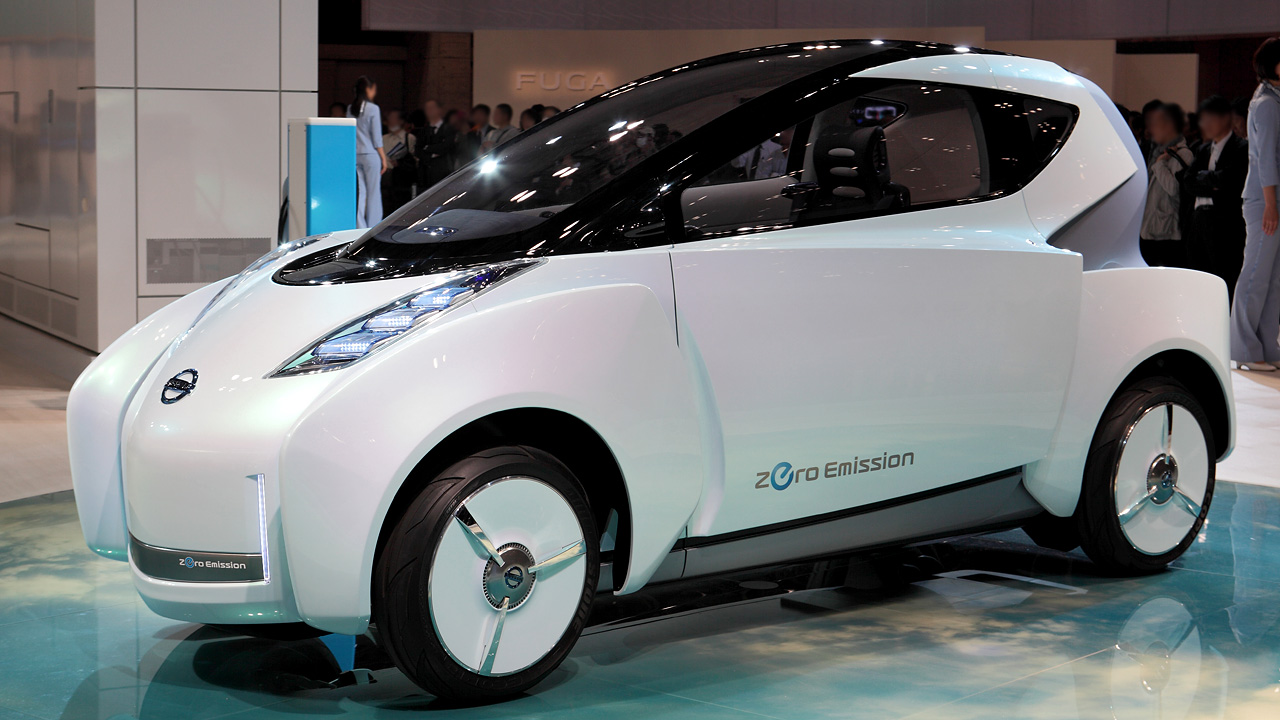
- Nissan Land Glider at the 2009 Tokyo Motor Show

Overview
- Type: Concept car
- Manufacturer: Nissan
- Production: 2009

The Nissan Land Glider is an electric concept car presented by the Japanese car manufacturer Nissan at the 2009 Tokyo Motor Show.

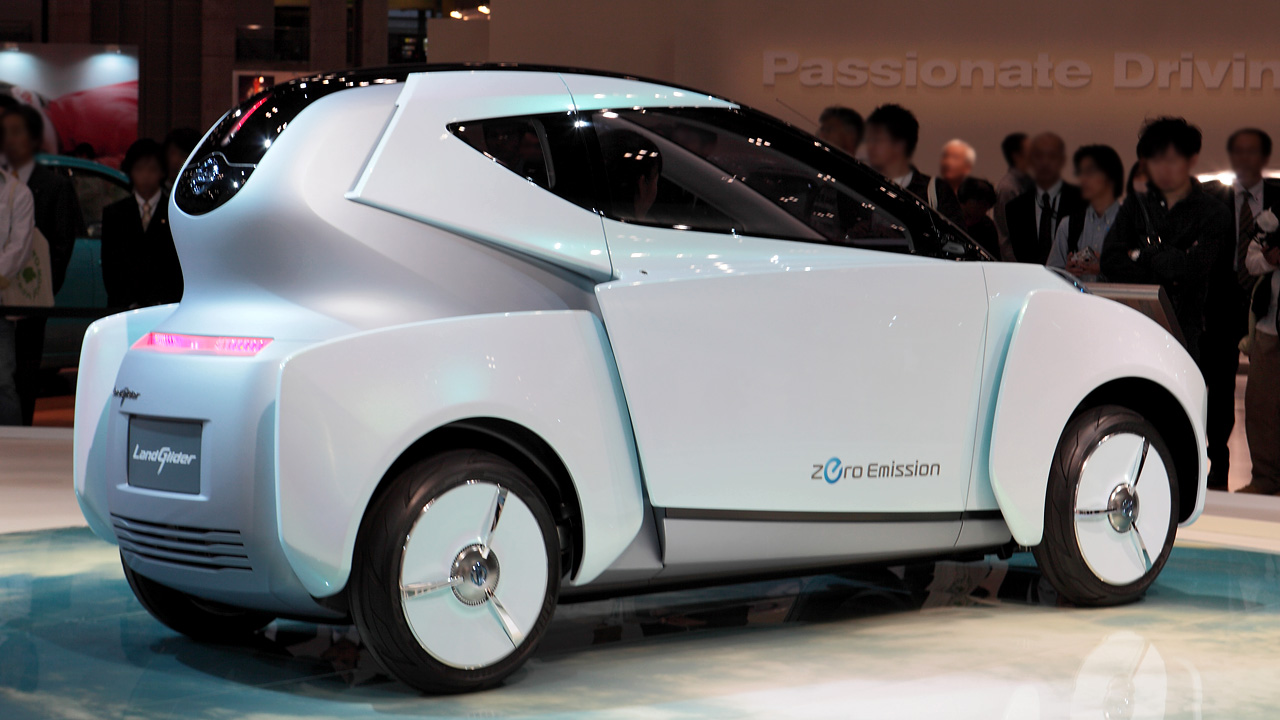
Rear view

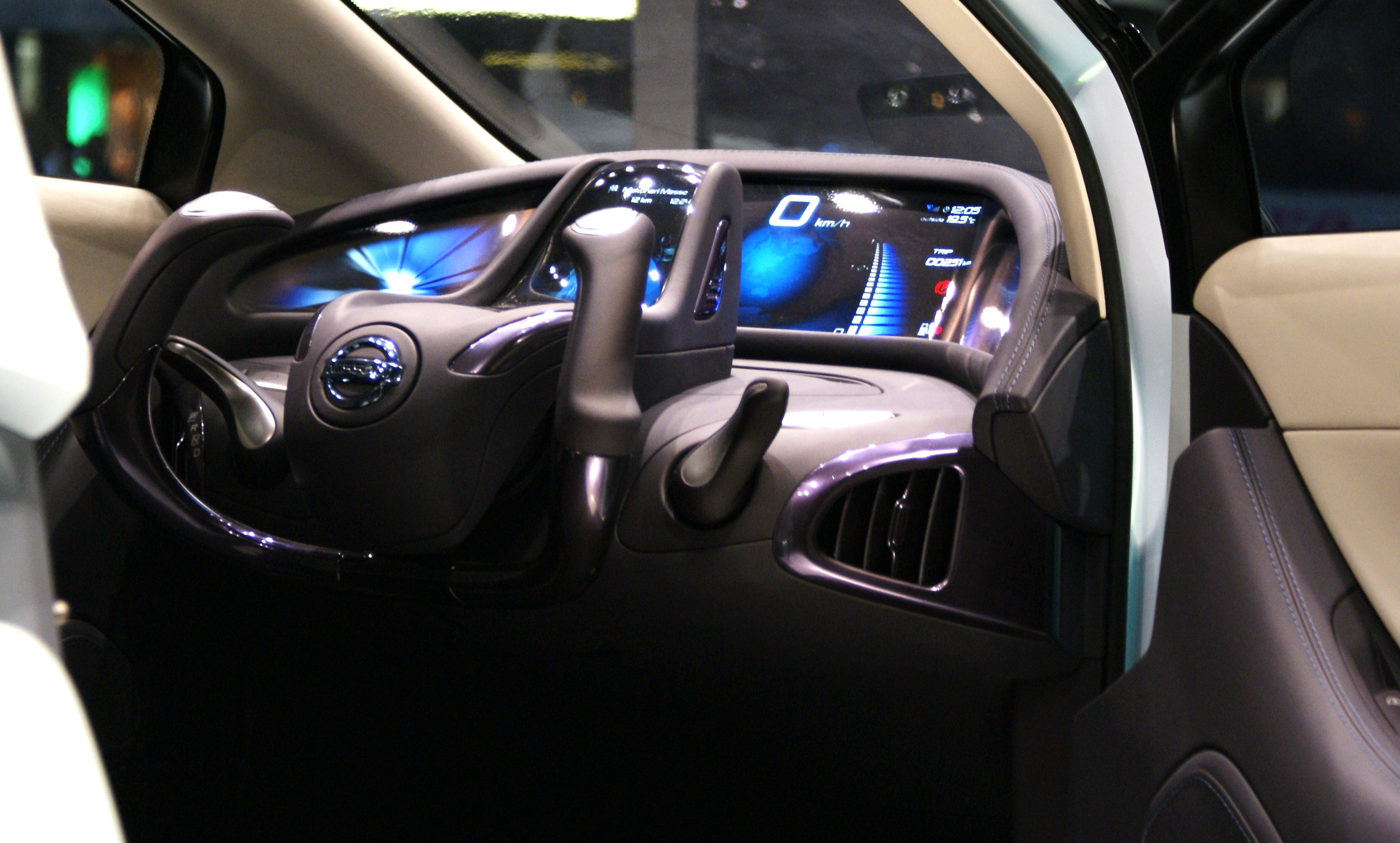
Interior

The Land Glider, a narrow-track vehicle, looks and feels like a mixture between a car, a motorcycle, and an airplane. The rear-view mirrors have been replaced by cameras and monitors. Inside, the traditional steering wheel is replaced with something similar in appearance to an aircraft's yoke control. Riding on a motorcycle-inspired Tandem architecture, the Land Glider and its tires can lean up to 17 degrees in turns. Power comes from two electric motors connected to lithium-ion batteries mounted underneath the floor. The Land Glider features a non-contact charging system that enables it to be recharged at any wireless charging station.
