= F750 =

F750 may refer to:

- Formula 750, International motorcycle road racing series known as F750
- 750 Formula, British historic single seat open car racing
- 750 Motor Club Organisers of 750 Formula car racing
- Ford F-Series (medium duty truck)
