= 750 Motor Club =

Motor racing club in the UK

750 Motor Club is a motor racing club in the UK. It was founded in 1939 to promote the sporting use of the Austin 7. '750' refers to the near-750cc Austin 7 engine. It later led to racing and the 750 Formula where specials are raced. Famous members include Colin Chapman, Eric Broadley, Adrian Reynard, Arthur Mallock, Derek Bennett, Tony Southgate, Brian Hart, Gordon Murray, Jem Marsh, Frank Costin and Mike Pilbeam. These engineers and designers produced the first Lotus, Lola, Chevron, Speedex, Marcos, Pilbeam and other sports and racing cars between the 1940s and 1960s.

The 750MC has continued to promote competitive, low-cost racing for enthusiasts, with a range of championships for production and racing sports cars, saloons and single-seaters.

== Series and Championships ==
=== 750 Formula Championship ===
The world's oldest sports prototype formula, with all cars using the 1.1 litre Fiat FIRE engine. There are three classes:

- Class A: All competitors compete in this category.
- Class B: Drivers who have not finished on the podium, in the top six in Class A, or won the Class B title in the last five years.
- Class C: For college-entered teams.

- 750 Formula is the longest running championship in the world, beginning in 1949.

==== Championship results ====
Year	Champion	2nd	3rd	Class B winner
2023	Peter Bove (Darvi 88P)	Steve Boother (Darvi Mk5)	Mark Glover (Racekits Falcon)	Jake Doherty (SS/F 750F)
2022	Peter Bove (Darvi 88P)	Oliver Collett (Racekits Falcon)	Richard Rothery (PRS 1b)	Matthew Unwin (Racekits Falcon)
2021	Peter Bove (Darvi 88P)	Chris Gough (CGR2 Evo)	Mick Harris (Darvi 597)	Raymond Barley (Racekits Falcon)
2020	Peter Bove (Darvi Mk4/5)	Mark Glover (Racekits Falcon)	Andrew Kemp (Racekits Falcon)	Steve Boother (Darvi Mk5)
2019	Mark Glover (Racekits Falcon)	Peter Bove (Darvi Mk4/5)	Bill Rutter (Batten 3)	Richard Rothery (PRS 1b)
2018	Mark Glover (Racekits Falcon)	Bill Cowley (Cowley Mk4)	Ed Pither (PRS 1b)	Thomas Driscoll (Darvi Mk5/14B)
2017	Bill Cowley (Cowley Mk4)	Mark Glover (Racekits Falcon)	Robin Gearing (Darvi P88)	Conway Daw (Centaur)
2016	Robin Gearing (Darvi P88)	Bill Cowley (Cowley Mk4)	Peter Bove (Darvi Mk4/5)	Andrew Lake (Darvi 91D)
2015	David Bartholomew (PRS 1B)	Robin Gearing (Darvi P88)	Bill Cowley (Cowley Mk4)	Daniel Welsh (Racekits Falcon)
2014	Billy Albone (Batten 3)	Bill Cowley (Cowley Mk4)	Chris Gough (CGR Evo 2)	Ian Barley (Racekits Falcon)
2013	Dave Hodkin (HRD Mk1)	Chris Gough (CGR Evo 2)	Dave Robson (SDAR/83)	Huw Davies (Phoenix Fire)
2012	Dave Robson (SDAR/83)	Nathaniel Cooper (Davis T7)	Dave Hodkin (HRD Mk1)	Dave Hodkin (HRD Mk1)
2011	Nathaniel Cooper (Davis T7)	Mick Harris (Darvi 877)	Bill Rutter (Darvi 877)	Sue Harris (Darvi 5/97)
2010	Roger Rowe (Centaur Mk20)	Bob Simpson (SS/F)	Nathaniel Cooper (Davis T7)	Paul Collins (Darvi Mk5)
2009	Dave Robson (SDAR/83)	Mick Harris (Darvi 877)	Roger Rowe (Centaur Mk20)	Colin Wolstenholme (Darvi Mk5)
2008	Peter Bove (ADR 750F)	Dave Robson (SDAR/83)	Mick Harris (Darvi 877)	Max Sheppard (Sheppard MS750)

=== Alfa Romeo Championship ===
Joining the club in 2020, the Alfa Romeo Championship caters for all types of the marques cars, classified in three categories - Modified, Power Trophy and Twin Spark Cup.

==== Championship results ====
Year	Champion	2nd	3rd	Modified champion	V6 champion	Power Trophy champion	Twin Spark champion
2023	James Ford (Alfa Romeo 156)	Tom Hill (Alfa Romeo GT)	Toby Broome (Alfa Romeo 156)	Mike Hilton (Alfa Romeo 4C)	Tom Hill (Alfa Romeo GT)	Stacey Dennis (Alfa Romeo Giulietta)	James Ford (Alfa Romeo 156)

Year	Champion	2nd	3rd	Modified champion	Power Trophy champion	Twin Spark champion
2022	Andrew Bourke (Alfa Romeo 156)	Tom Hill (Alfa Romeo GT)	Jon Billingsley (Alfa Romeo 147)	Scott Austin (Alfa Romeo 156)	Tom Hill (Alfa Romeo GT)	Andrew Bourke (Alfa Romeo 156)
2021	Barry McMahon (Alfa Romeo 156)	George Osborne (Alfa Romeo 75)	Richard Ford (Alfa Romeo 156)	Barry McMahon (Alfa Romeo 156)	George Osborne (Alfa Romeo 75)	Richard Ford (Alfa Romeo 156)
2020	Tom Hill (Alfa Romeo GT)	Andrew Bourke (Alfa Romeo 156)	Dave Messenger (Alfa Romeo 156)	Graham Seager (Alfa Romeo GTV)	Tom Hill (Alfa Romeo GT)	Andrew Bourke (Alfa Romeo 156)
2019	Tom Hill (Alfa Romeo 156)	Dave Messenger (Alfa Romeo 156)	Andrew Bourke (Alfa Romeo 156)	Mervyn Miller (Alfa Romeo 156)	Dave Messenger (Alfa Romeo 156)	Tom Hill (Alfa Romeo 156)
2018	Tom Hill (Alfa Romeo 156)	Paul Webster (Alfa Romeo 156)	Scott Austin (Alfa Romeo 155)	Chris Oxborough (Alfa Romeo 75)	Paul Webster (Alfa Romeo 156)	Tom Hill (Alfa Romeo 156)
2017	Andrew Bourke (Alfa Romeo 156)	Tom Hill (Alfa Romeo 156)	Simon Cresswell (Alfa Romeo 156)	Graham Seager (Alfa Romeo GTV)	Paul Webster (Alfa Romeo 156)	Andrew Bourke (Alfa Romeo 156)
2016	Tom Hill (Alfa Romeo 156)	Simon Cresswell (Alfa Romeo 156)	Dave Messenger (Alfa Romeo 156)	Andy Robinson (Alfa Romeo 156)	Ron Davidson (Alfa Romeo 164)	Tom Hill (Alfa Romeo 156)
2015	Graham Seager (Alfa Romeo GTV)	James Bishop (Alfa Romeo 156)	Tom Hill (Alfa Romeo 156)	Graham Seager (Alfa Romeo GTV)	Ray Foley (Alfa Romeo 147)	Tom Hill (Alfa Romeo 156)

=== Armed Forces Race Challenge ===
Primarily a motor racing community for Service personnel and veterans, AFRC rewards consistency as well as outright pace and achieved championship status in 2017.

=== Bikesports Championship ===
A championship for sports-racing cars using production motorcycle 4-stroke engines, with their standard transmissions. There are currently three classes:

- Class A: Cars using 'tuned' motorbike engines up to 1500cc (different weight limits apply based on capacity)
- Class B: Cars using 'production' motorbike engines up to 1500cc (different weight limits apply based on capacity)
- Class C: Cars using motorbike engines up to 1100cc

==== Championship results ====
Year	Champion	2nd	3rd	Class A champion	Class B champion	Class C champion	Class D champion
2023	Leon Morrell (Radical SR3)	Charles Hall (Mittell MC41R)	Alastair Smart (Radical PR6)	Charles Hall (Mittell MC41R)	Leon Morrell (Radical SR3)	n/a	n/a
2022	Simon Walker-Hansell (Radical SR3)	Leon Morrell (Radical SR3)	Alastair Smart (Radical PR6)	Alastair Smart (Radical PR6)	Simon Walker-Hansell (Radical SR3)	n/a	n/a
2021	Leon Morrell (Radical SR3)	Scott Mittell (Mittell MC41R)	Joe Stables (Radical PR6)	Scott Mittell (Mittell MC41R)	Leon Morrell (Radical SR3)	Matthew Minett (Spire GT3)	n/a
2020	Charles Hall (Spire GT3)	Martin Brooks (Radical PR6)	Michael Chen (Radical SR3)	Charles Hall (Spire GT3)	Michael Chen (Radical SR3)	n/a	n/a
2019	Joe Stables (Radical SR3)	Josh Smith (Radical PR6)	Joe Lock (Radical PR6)	Josh Smith (Radical PR6)	Joe Stables (Radical SR3)	Scott Mittell (Mittell MC-41R)	n/a
2018	Joe Stables (Radical SR3)	Lee Torrie (Radical SR3)	Richard Stables (Radical PR6)	Lee Torrie (Radical SR3)	Joe Stables (Radical SR3)	n/a	n/a
2017	Stefano Leaney (Radical PR6)	Chris Preen (Radical SR3)	Julian Griffiths (Radical PR6)	Doug Carter (Radical PR6)	Stefano Leaney (Radical PR6)	Richard Webb (Spire GTF)	n/a
2016	Phil Knibb (Radical SR3)	Will Brown (Radical PR6)	Joe Stables (Radical PR6)	Phil Knibb (Radical SR3)	Will Brown (Radical PR6)	Max Lees (Mission T5)	Robert Gardiner (Spire GT3)
2015	Tim Gray (Spire GT3)	Adrian Reynard (Radical SR3)	Tim Porter (Radical SR3)	Adrian Reynard (Radical SR3)	Tim Gray (Spire GT3)	Julian Griffiths (Spire GT3)	Peter Lague (Spire GT3)
2014	Adrian Reynard (Radical SR3)	Tim Gray (Spire GT3)	James Breakell (Radical PR6)	Adrian Reynard (Radical SR3)	Tim Gray (Spire GT3)	Richard Wise (Spire GT3)	n/a
2013	Tim Gray (Spire GT3)	Jon-Paul Ivey (Radical PR6)	James Breakell (Radical PR6)	Lewis Plato (Radical SR3)	Jon-Paul Ivey (Radical PR6)	Tim Gray (Spire GT3)	n/a
2012	James Breakell (Radical PR6)	Richard Stables (Radical PR6)	Oliver Cox (Radical SR4)	James Breakell (Radical PR6)	Oliver Cox (Radical SR4)	James Wingfield (Coombes Sport 6C)	n/a
2011	Richard Stables Radical PR6)	Christian Enderby (Radical SR4)	James Breakell (Radical PR6)	Richard Stables Radical PR6)	Christian Enderby (Radical SR4)	Alan Wilshire (Radical Clubsport)	Callum MacKillop (Radical Clubsport)
2010	Richard Stables (Radical PR6)	James Breakell (Radical PR6)	Oliver Cox (Radical SR4)	Richard Stables (Radical PR6)	Peter Brown (Radical Clubsport)	Joe Jackson (Global GT)	n/a
2009	Darren Luke (Radical PR6)	Callum MacKillop (Radical Clubsport)	Ake Bournebusch (Radical PR6)	Darren Luke (Radical PR6)	Tommy Gilmartin	Kevin Goater	Callum MacKillop (Radical Clubsport)
2008	Jonathan Wright (Radical PR6)	Graham Miller	Richard Stables (Radical PR6)	Jonathan Wright (Radical PR6)	Oliver Hulme	Graham Miller	n/a

=== Birkett Relay ===
A six-hour relay event where competitors race for scratch and handicap positions, open to sports cars and saloon cars. The race was first run in 1951, and was created by Holland Birkett, who was one of the founding members of the 750 Motor Club. In 2001, a twelve-hour race was also held. Currently, the event is held at the Silverstone Circuit on the full Historic GP layout.

==== Results ====
Scratch winners:

- 2022 - Raw Motorsport (Chris Preen, John MacLeod, Ben Stone)
- 2021 - RJ Motorsport with Daytona (Alistair Smart, Simon Freeman, Charles Graham)
- 2020 - Raw Motorsport (John MacLeod, Shane Stoney, Tom Ashton)
- 2019 - Breakell Racing Heroes (Wade Eastwood, Charles Graham, Luciano Bacheta)
- 2018 – Cupra Racing (Carl Swift, Shayne Deegan, Stewart Lines, Lee Deegan)
- 2017 – Dobbers (Thomas Harvey, Brian Harvey, John Macleod)
- 2016 – We Don't Like Second (Aaron Bailey, Doug Carter, Brian Murphy, Simon Garmston, Lee Bailey)
- 2015 – Inspires (Tim Gray, John Cutmore, Richard Wise, Alistair Boulton)
- 2014 – The Winning Radicals (Aaron Bailey, Doug Carter, Brian Murphy, Lee Bailey and John Macleod)
- 2013 – The Third Radicals (Aaron Bailey, Oliver Cox, Doug Carter, Charles Harvey-Kelly and Lee Bailey)
- 2012 – Team O'BR (Mark Burton, Paul Rose, Graham Pattle, Graham Booth and Eugene O'Brien)
- 2011 – IVOLT/Radical (Manhal Allos, Mark Smithson and Phil Abbott)
- 2010 – Nearly Six Sevens (Peter Ratcliffe, Chris Porritt, Keith Dunn, Kevin Williams and Ian Wale)
- 2009 – Geoff Steel Racing (Jamie Martin, Michael Symons, Keith Webster and Peter Moulsdale)
- 2008 – Hart Attacks (Chris Hart, Barry Webb, Mike Evans, Jamie Champkin and Michelle Hayward)
- 2007 – Gold Arts (Doug Newman, Simon Harris, John Schneider and Patrick Gormely)
- 2006 – Gold Arts (Doug Newman, Simon Harris, Graham Booth and John Schneider)
- 2005 – Gold Arts (Doug Newman, Simon Harris, Graham Booth and John Schneider)
- 2004 – Glenn Racing (J.Taylor, S.Leighton, S.Hopkins, R.Gomes, B. Simpson and M. Simpson)
- 2003 – Glenn Racing (J.Taylor, S.Leighton, S.Hopkins, R.Gomes, B. Simpson and M. Simpson)
- 2002 – Woody's Wonders (J.Woodward, M.Fry, S.Maurer, D.Pegley and R. Mayers
- 2001 - The Hart Attacks (Clive Woodward, Peter Richings, Paul Freeman, Howard Payne, Daniel Eagling and Glenn Eagling)
- 2000 - Extremely Radical Racers (Robert Oldershaw Jnr, Robert Oldershaw Snr, David Tinn, Andrew Middleton, Stuart Woodcock and Steven Woodcock)

Handicap winners:

- 2022 - Routec Racing (Martin Roche, Martin Gadsby, Colin Whitehouse)
- 2021 - RAF Motorsport (Alexander Smith, David Russell, Simon Frowen, Dan Smith)
- 2020 - The Three Amigos 3.0 (Paul Hinson, David Drinkwater, Adam Read)
- 2019 - The Three Amigos 2.0 (Paul Hinson, David Drinkwater, Adam Read)
- 2018 – Red Rascal (Chris Lovett, Russell Clarke, Kenny Coleman, Kevin Dengate, Jamie Ingram, Reece Jones)
- 2017 – RAF MSA (Chris Slator, Darren Howe, Scott Lawson, Ed McKean, Dan Smith)
- 2016 – Carbon8 Coupe Cup B (Will Taylforth, Alex Cursley, Simon Miles)
- 2015 – Team Owens (Will Schryver, Steve Laidlaw, Carl Swift, Endaf Owens)
- 2014 – Six Signatures (Jim Needham, Kurt Brady, John Toshack, Spencer Horgan, David Rowe)
- 2013 - Regency / TBR (Tom Bell, Nathan Saunders, Lee Deegan, Shayne Deegan)
- 2012 - Dirty Half Dozen (Danny Cassar, Steve Cassar, Garry Barlow, Ashley Collins, Alan Yearley, Alex Hughes)
- 2011 - RAFMSA Team Flywheel (Ian Fletcher, Darren Berris, Chris Slator, Darren Howe, Ed Fuller)
- 2010 - OX4R (Gavin Bristow, Chris Oakman, James Loukes, Steve Liquorish, Mark Harrison)
- 2009 - The Six Potters (Gail Hill, Chris Boon, David Bye, Peter Dorlin, Matt Skelton, Richard Dorlin)
- 2008 - RAF MSA Help For Heroes (Brian Watson, Gareth Nutley, Jason Lappin, Steve Platts, Simon Wing, John Holmes)
- 2007 - RAF MSA Flywheel (Ian Fletcher, Martyn Ashley, Simon Hutchinson, Darren Berris, Paul Martin Jones)
- 2006 - Ecurie Porumphorganda (Ken Davies, Julian Gammage, Joe Henderson, Paul Aslett, Richard Thorne, Matthew Hammond)
- 2005 - The Four DBL's (Tom Smith, James Cottingham, Michael Johnson, Bob Luff)

=== BMW Car Club Racing ===
BMW Car Club Racing (BMWCCR) began in 2018 and is for club-level BMW racers. There is championship status for 2019 and classes catering for all four-cylinder, six-cylinder and differing levels of M-powered cars. BMWCCR is also backed by the BMW Car Club GB.

==== Championship results ====
Year	Champion	2nd	3rd	M1 champion	M2 champion	Class 6 champion	Cup class champion	Class 4 champion
2023	Steve Schweikhardt (BMW E46 330)	Graham Crowhurst (BMW E46 M3)	Gareth Thomas (BMW E46 325)	Graham Crowhurst (BMW E46 M3)	Mark Burton (BMW E46 330)	Steve Schweikhardt (BMW E46 330)	Gareth Thomas (BMW 325 Ti)	Andrew Pywell (BMW E36 318)

Year	Champion	2nd	3rd	M1 champion	M2 champion	Class 6 champion	Cup class champion
2022	Lee Piercey (BMW E36 328i)	Graham Crowhurst (BMW E46 M3)	Gareth Thomas (BMW 325Ti)	Graham Crowhurst (BMW E46 M3)	Rahim Baloo (BMW E46 M3)	Lee Piercey (BMW E36 328i)	Gareth Thomas (BMW 325 Ti)
2021	Ben Pearson (BMW E46 330i)	Niall Bradley (BMW E46 M3)	Brad Sheehan (BMW E46 M3)	Niall Bradley (BMW E46 M3)	Gary Burstow (BMW E46 M3)	Ben Pearson (BMW E46 330i)	Karl McMillan (BMW 325 Ti)
2020	Kevin Denwood (BMW E46 Compact)	Paul Cook (BMW E46 M3)	Graham Crowhurst (BMW E46 M3)	Michael Pensavalle (BMW E46 M3)	Paul Cook (BMW E46 M3)	Kevin Denwood (BMW E46 Compact)	Clive Watson (BMW 325 Ti)
2019	Matt Page (BMW 325 Ti)	Graham Crowhurst (BMW E46 M3)	Clive Watson (BMW 325 Ti)	Mike Cutt (BMW E36 M3)	Graham Crowhurst (BMW E46 M3)	Darren Ball (BMW E46 330i)	Matt Page (BMW 325 Ti)

=== Classic Stock Hatch Championship ===
A longstanding formula for 1,400 cc (85.4 cu in) multi-valve, or 1,600 cc (97.6 cu in) 8-valve engined hatchbacks. All cars models must have been produced prior to January 1992.

==== Championship winners ====
Year	Champion	2nd	3rd	4th	5th
2023	Stewart Place (Peugeot 205 GTi)	Chris Dear (Peugeot 205 GTi)	Ben Bateman (Vauxhall Nova GTE)	James Haslehurst (Peugeot 205 GTi)	Lee Scott (Ford Fiesta XR2i)
2022	Chris Dear (Peugeot 205 GTi)	Pete Morgan (Ford Fiesta XR2)	Martin Rodgers (Peugeot 205 GTi)	Lee Scott (Ford Fiesta XR2i)	Paul Thorpe (Ford Fiesta XR2)
2021	Ryan Morgan (Ford Fiesta XR2)	Chris Dear (Peugeot 205 GTi)	Stewart Place (Peugeot 205 GTi)	Martin Rodgers (Peugeot 205 GTi)	Martin Cayzer (Ford Fiesta XR2i)
2020	Pip Hammond (Vauxhall Nova GTE)	Ryan Morgan (Ford Fiesta XR2)	Lee Scott (Ford Fiesta XR2i)	Andrew Thorpe (Citroen AX GTi)	Jeff Humphries (Peugeot 205 GTi)
2019	Lee Scott (Ford Fiesta XR2i)	Matt Rozier (Peugeot 205 GTi)	Andrew Thorpe (Citroen AX GTi)	Edward Cooper (Vauxhall Nova GSi)	Matthew Stubington (Peugeot 205 GTi)
2018	Lee Scott (Ford Fiesta XR2i)	Matt Rozier (Peugeot 205 GTi)	Marcus Ward (Ford Fiesta XR2i)	Edward Cooper (Vauxhall Nova GSi)	Martin Cayzer (Ford Fiesta XR2i)
2017	Lee Scott (Ford Fiesta XR2i)	Matthew Stubington (Peugeot 205 GTi)	Matt Rozier (Peugeot 205 GTi)	Andrew Thorpe (Citroen AX GTi)	Edward Cooper (Vauxhall Nova GSi)
2016	Matt Rozier (Peugeot 205 GTi)	Lee Scott (Ford Fiesta XR2i)	Matthew Stubington (Peugeot 205	Andrew Thorpe (Citroen AX GTi)	Edward Cooper (Vauxhall Nova GSi)
2015	Matt Rozier (Peugeot 205 GTi)	Andrew Thorpe (Citroen AX GTi)	Lee Scott (Ford Fiesta XR2i)	Gordon MacMillan (Peugeot 205 GTi)	Mervyn Beckett (Vauxhall Nova GTE)
2014	Lee Scott (Ford Fiesta XR2i)	Andy Philpotts (Ford Fiesta XR2i)	Matt Rozier (Peugeot 205 GTi)	Gordon MacMillan (Peugeot 205 GTi)	Mervyn Beckett (Vauxhall Nova GTE)
2013	Lee Scott (Ford Fiesta XR2i)	Matt Rozier (Peugeot 205 GTi)	Imran Khan (Ford Fiesta XR2)	Andy Philpotts (Ford Fiesta XR2i)	Mervyn Beckett (Vauxhall Nova GTE)
2012	Damian Cottrell (Vauxhall Nova GTE)	Matt Rozier (Peugeot 205 GTi)	Paul Thorpe (Ford Fiesta XR2i)	Edward Cooper (Vauhall Nova GTE)	Martin Cayzer (Ford Fiesta XR2i)

Prior to 2012, pre '92 cars ran as Stock Hatch Class B.

Year	Champion	2nd	3rd	4th	5th
2011	Pip Hammond (Vauxhall Nova GTE)	Matt Rozier (Peugeot 205 GTi)	Martin Cayzer (Ford Fiesta XR2i)	Edward Cooper (Vauhall Nova GTE)	Andy Philpotts (Ford Fiesta XR2i)
2010	Lee Scott (Ford Fiesta XR2i)	Sarah Niblett (Peugeot 205 GTi)	Martyn Fowdrey (Ford Fiesta XR2)	Alan Duly (Ford Fiesta XR2)	Adam Lichtig (Ford Fiesta XR2i)
2009	Pip Hammond (Vauxhall Nova GTE)	Darren Barden (Peugeot 205 GTi)	Jonathan Wooley (Ford Fiesta XR2i)	Matt Rozier (Peugeot 205 GTi)	Lee Scott (Ford Fiesta XR2i)
2008	Lee Scott (Ford Fiesta XR2i))	Matt Rozier (Peugeot 205 GTi	Tim Mizen (Ford Fiesta XR2i)	Matt Digby (Ford Fiesta XR2)	John Hemming (Vauxhall Nova (GSi)

==== Stock Hatch ====
The Stock Hatch Championship ran to the same rule set but allowed in newer cars and came to an end in 2016 after a long, successful history with the club – attracting over 100 registrations in its prime with the Citroën Saxo generally being the car of choice.

Year	Champion	2nd	3rd	4th	5th
2016	Ryan Polley	Paul Jarvis	Philip Law	Robert Fagg	Ian Williamson
2015	Shayne Deegan	Lee Deegan	Scott Sharp	Paul Jarvis	Paul Newton
2014	Shayne Deegan	Lee Deegan	Carl Swift	Tom Bell	Paul Jarvis
2013	Tom Bell	Shayne Deegan	Lee Deegan	Nathan Saunders	Paul Jarvis
2012	Joe Ferguson	Tom Bell	Matt Digby	Andrew Tibbs	Martin Ward
2011	Patrick Fletcher	Matt Digby	Martin Ward	Jake Farndon	Shaun Hagen
2010	Josh Cook	Jeff Humphries	Matt Digby	Patrick Fletcher	Joe Fletcher
2009	Jeff Humphries	Ryan Bensley	Simon Hunt	Terry Roughton	Josh Cook
2008	Ryan Bensley	Jeff Humphries	James Marshall	Graham Mulholland	Wayne Harris

=== Clio Sport Championship ===
A one-make championship for the Renault Clio 182, 197 and 200 models.

==== Championship Results ====
Year	Champion	2nd	3rd	Class A winner	Class B winner
2025	Jack Kingsbury	Darren Ransom	Lewis Richardson	Lewis Richardson	Jack Kingsbury
2024	Peter O'Connor	Justin Griffiths	Darren Ransom	Peter O'Connor	Justin Griffiths
2023	Chris Lawrence	Jack Kingsbury	Jack Dwane	Chris Lawrence	Jack Kingsbury
2022	Andrew Harding	Justin Griffiths	Spencer Stevenson	Jack Dwane	Andrew Harding

From 2015 to 2021, the championship was solely the Clio 182 Championship.

Year	Champion	2nd	3rd	4th	5th	6th
2021	Jack Dwane	Jack Kingsbury	Scott Edgar	Andrew Harding	Christopher Keir	Jason Pelosi
2020	Ryan Polley	Scott Edgar	Josh Larkin	Simon Freeman	Andrew Harding	Christopher Keir
2019	Ryan Polley	James Bark	Don De Graaff	Scott Edgar	Simon Donoghue	Jay Daniels
2018	Patrick Fletcher	Jack Kingsbury	Ryan Polley	Mark Balmer	Don De Graaff	Andrew Tibbs
2017	Patrick Fletcher	Matt Digby	Don De Graaff	Nick Garner	Scott Sharp	Ryan Polley
2016	Patrick Fletcher	James Bark	Philip Wright	Nick Garner	Trevor Gregory	Scott Sharp
2015	James Bark	Patrick Fletcher	Matt Digby	Andrew Tibbs	Philip Wright	George Williams

=== Club Enduro Championship ===
An endurance racing championship designed with the club-level competitor and budget in mind. Races are usually two or three hours long, with at least one mandatory three-minute pitstop to allow re-fuelling. Three classes separated by power to weight allow the vast majority of cars to be eligible, with outputs monitored by 750MC's own mobile rolling road.

- Class A: Up to 300 bhp/tonne (power at flywheel, weight without driver).
- Class B: Up to 240 bhp/tonne (power at flywheel, weight without driver).
- Class C: Up to 180 bhp/tonne (power at flywheel, weight without driver).

The endurance race series for production sports and saloon cars began as a series in 2016, after a trial race in Snetterton the previous year and gained MSA Championship status in 2018, boasting some of the biggest grids in the UK.

==== 2015 trial race ====
Round	Winner	2nd	3rd	Class A winner	Class B winner	Class C winner
Snetterton (150 minutes)	Lee Spencer / Stephen Pearson / Dave Griffin (BMW M3)	Steve Hewson / Phil Brough / Rob Gilham (Peugeot 106 / Peugeot 924)	Stewart Mutch / Ben Short (Mazda MX150R)	Lee Spencer / Stephen Pearson / Dave Griffin (BMW M3)	Steve Hewson / Phil Brough / Rob Gilham (Peugeot 106 / Peugeot 924)	Nicolas Jackson / Dylan Brychta (Volkswagen Golf / Seat Ibiza)

==== 2016 season ====
===== Results =====
Round	Winner	2nd	3rd	Class A winner	Class B winner	Class C winner
Donington Park (2 Hours)	Ben Demetriou / Jonathan Evans (Porsche 968)	Neville Anderson / Allan Gibson (BMW M3 / Lotus Exige)	Andy Marston / Brett Evans (BMW M3)	Neville Anderson / Allan Gibson (BMW M3 / Lotus Exige)	Ben Demetriou / Jonathan Evans (Porsche 968)	Liam Crilly / Jonny MacGregor (Mazda RX8)
Snetterton (2 Hours)	Russ Olivant / Elliott Norris (Caterham Roadsport)	Henry Wright / Jamie Packham (BMW M3)	Andy Marston / Brett Evans (BMW M3)	Henry Wright / Jamie Packham (BMW M3)	Blair Roebuck / Daniel Adams (Honda Civic / Proton Satria)	Liam Crilly / Petteri Jokinen (Mazda RX8 / Mini Cooper)
Silverstone (90 minutes)	Jamie Packham / Phil Keen (BMW M3)	Kevin Dengate / Chris Lovett (BMW M3)	Andy Marston / Brett Evans (BMW M3)	Jamie Packham / Phil Keen (BMW M3)	Jonathan Evans / Tom Bradshaw (Porsche 968)	Liam Crilly / Jonny MacGregor (Mazda RX8 / Mini Cooper)

==== 2017 season ====
===== Results =====
Round	Winner	2nd	3rd	Class A winner	Class B winner	Class C winner
Donington Park (2 Hours)	Neil Primrose / Luke Schlewitz (BMW 135D)	Rory Hinde / Owen Fitzgerald (BMW M3)	Chris Brown / Mika Brown (Aston Martin Vantage)	Neil Primrose / Luke Schlewitz (BMW 135D)	Thomas Helliwell / Daniel Ludlow (Honda Civic)	Robert Armitage (Renault Clio)
Snetterton (2 Hours)	Alan Henderson / Daniel Irving (Ginetta G50)	Andy Marston / Brett Evans (BMW M3)	Carl Readshaw (BMW M3)	Alan Henderson / Daniel Irving (Ginetta G50)	Stuart Ratcliffe / Anthony Dunn (Lotus Elise)	Andrew Winchester (BMW Compact)
Anglesey (3 Hours)	Andy Marston / Brett Evans (BMW M3)	Carl Readshaw / Daniel Taylor (BMW M3)	Daniel Irving / Jack Harding / Will Stephenson (Ginetta G50)	Andy Marston / Brett Evans (BMW M3)	Charlese Graham / Wade Eastwood Lotus Exige)	Andrew Winchester / Josh Orr (BMW Compact)
Silverstone (2 Hours)	Carl Swift / Rob Baker (Honda Civic)	Mark Harris / Endaf Owens (Honda Civic)	Chris Brown / Mika Brown (Aston Martin Vantage)	Carl Swift / Rob Baker (Honda Civic)	Alan Henderson / Daniel Jude (Lotus Exige)	James Tucker / Louis Wall (Lotus Elise)
Spa (2 Hours)	Danny Winstanley / Andrew Hough (Caterham)	Michael Price / Callum MacLeod (Porsche 996)	Carl Readshaw / Daniel Taylor (BMW M3)	Carl Readshaw / Daniel Taylor (BMW M3)	Michael Price / Callum MacLeod (Porsche 996)	Mark Holme / Jonathan Hoad (Mazda MX5)

==== 2018 season ====
===== Results =====
Round	Race winner	2nd place	3rd place	Class A winner	Class B winner	Class C winner
Oulton Park (2 Hours)	Guy Colclough (Seat Leon)	Matt Faizey (Porsche 968)	Andy Baylie / Luke Schlewitz (BMW M3)	Guy Colclough (Seat Leon)	Matt Faizey (Porsche 968)	Steve Hewson / Matt Nossiter (BMW 328i)
Rockingham (3 Hours)	Andy Baylie / Luke Schlewitz (BMW M3)	Matt Faizey (Porsche 968)	Kevin Dengate / Chris Lovett (BMW M3)	Andy Baylie / Luke Schlewitz (BMW M3)	Matt Faizey (Porsche 968)	Steve Hewson / Matt Nossiter (BMW 328i)
Spa race one (100 minutes)	Michael Price / Callum MacLeod (Porsche 997)	Jody Halse / Camal Osman (BMW M3)	Rob Meredith (BMW M3)	Michael Price / Callum MacLeod (Porsche 997)	Jody Halse / Camal Osman (BMW M3)	Graham McMurchie / Nick Dougill (Mazda MX5)
Spa race two (100 minutes)	Michael Price / Callum MacLeod (Porsche 997)	Carl Readshaw / Daniel Taylor (BMW M3)	Julian McBride (BMW M3)	Michael Price / Callum MacLeod (Porsche 997)	Jody Halse / Camal Osman (BMW M3)	Steve Hewson / Matt Nossiter (BMW 328i)
Silverstone (2 Hours)	Luke Sedzikowski (BMW M3)	Darren Ball (BMW M3)	Martin James (Honda Civic)	Luke Sedzikowski (BMW M3)	Matt Faizey (Porsche 968)	Steve Hewson / Matt Nossiter (BMW 328i)
Anglesey (3 Hours)	Matt Faizey / Mark Hammersley (Porsche 968)	Carl Readshaw / Daniel Taylor (BMW M3)	Rob Meredith / Andy Marston (BMW M3)	Carl Readshaw / Daniel Taylor (BMW M3)	Matt Faizey / Mark Hammersley (Porsche 968)	Andrew Wincheseter / Josh Orr (BMW Compact)
Snetterton (2 Hours)	Del Shelton / Phil Keen (BMW M3)	Michael Price / Marcus Clutton (Porsche 997)	Chris Brown / Michael Bentwood (BMW M4)	Del Shelton / Phil Keen (BMW M3)	Matt Faizey (Porsche 968)	Steve Hewson / Matt Nossiter (BMW 328i)

===== Championship points =====
Position	Class A	Class B	Class C
1st	Andy Baylie / Luke Schlewitz (BMW M3) – 53	Matt Faizey (Porsche 968) – 77	Steve Hewson / Matt Nossiter (BMW 328i) – 79
2nd	Carl Readshaw / Daniel Taylor (BMW M3) – 50	Ben Salmon / Nick Starkey / Matt Maxted (BMW M3) – 48	Andrew Winchester / Josh Orr (BMW Compact) – 54
3rd	Julian McBride / Geoff Steel (BMW M3) – 48	Steve Cheetham (Porsche Boxster) – 45	Graeme McMurchie / Nick Dougill (Mazda MX5) – 48
4th	Michael Price / Callum MacLeod / Marcus Clutton (Porsche 997) – 44	Colin Gillespie (BMW 130i) – 37	John Munro / Alan Duffy / Pip Hammond / Bobby Andrews (Mazda MX5) – 47
5th	Rob Meredith (BMW M3) – 39	Paul Ivens / Chris Hoey (Volkswagen Scirocco) – 35	Paul Sheard / Steve Dolman (Mazda MX5) – 43
6th	Darren Ball (BMW M3) – 37	Tony Hobson / Jonny Sharp (Volkswagen Golf) – 33	Nik Grove / Carlo Turner (BMW 328i) – 31
7th	Andy Marston / Brett Evans (BMW M3) – 33	Jody Halse / Cemal Osman (BMW M3) – 32	Geoffrey Gouriet / Russel Tamplin (Mazda MX5) – 30
8th	Martin James (Honda Civic) – 28	Charles Campbell / Graham Legget / Rob Smith (Peugeot RCZ) – 30	Liam Crilly (Mazda RX8) – 22
9th	Kevin Dengate / Chris Lovett (BMW M3) – 27	Leon Bidgway / Andy Chapman (Toyota MR2) – 21	David Downie (BMW 325i) – 21
10th	Bill Forbes (BMW M3) – 23	Stuart Daburn / David Trigg (Honda S2000) – 20	Alec Livesley / Justin Newman (Mazda MX5) – 20

==== 2019 season ====
===== Results =====
Round	Race winner	2nd place	3rd place	Class A winner	Class B winner	Class C winner
Donington Park 2 Hours	Luke Sedzikowski / David Whitmore (BMW M4)	Chris Brown / Mika Brown (BMW M4)	Steve Cheetham (Porsche Boxster)	Luke Sedzikowski / David Whitmore (BMW M4)	Steve Cheetham (Porsche Boxster)	Andrew Lightstead / Imran Khan (BMW 330)
Croft 3 Hours	Luke Sedzikowski / David Whitmore (BMW M4)	Andy Marston (BMW M4)	Chris Brown / Mika Brown (BMW M4)	Luke Sedzikowski / David Whitmore (BMW M4)	Steve Cheetham (Porsche Boxster)	Andrew Lightstead / Imran Khan (BMW 330)
Spa-Francorchamps race one	Ben Salmon (BMW M3)	Steve Cheetham (Porsche Boxster)	Stuart Daburn / David Trigg (Ginetta G50)	Richard Bacon (BMW M3)	Ben Salmon (BMW M3)	John Munro / Nick Dougill (Mazda MX5)
Spa-Francorchamps race two	Michael Price / Callum MacLeod (Porsche Cayman)	Joe Taylor (Lotus Elise)	Richard Bacon (BMW M3)	Michael Price / Callum MacLeod (Porsche Cayman)	Steve Cheetham (Porsche Boxster)	Andrew Lightstead / Imran Khan (BMW 330)
Silverstone International 2 Hours	Joe Taylor (Lotus Elise)	Chris Brown / Mika Brown (BMW M4)	Rory Hinde / Owen Fitzgerald (BMW M3)	Joe Taylor (Lotus Elise)	Steve Cheetham (Porsche Boxster)	Darren Kell / James Kell (Mazda MX5)
Oulton Park 2 Hours	Carl Swift / Rob Baker (Seat Leon)	Rory Hinde / Owen Fitzgerald (BMW M3)	Will Ashmore / Robert Taylor (BMW Compact)	Carl Swift / Rob Baker (Seat Leon)	Chris Nylan / Adam Burgess (Honda NSX)	Andrew Lightstead / Imran Khan (BMW 330)
Snetterton 2 Hours	Carl Swift / Rob Baker (Seat Leon)	Joe Taylor (Lotus Elise)	Michael Price / Michael Clutton (Porsche Cayman)	Carl Swift / Rob Baker (Seat Leon)	Ben Salmon / Matt Maxted (BMW M3)	Philipp Nagel / Darren Anderson (BMW 325i)
Silverstone GP 2 Hours	Carl Swift / Rob Baker (Seat Leon)	Joe Taylor (Lotus Elise)	Luke Sedzikowski / David Whitmore (BMW M4)	Carl Swift / Rob Baker (Seat Leon)	Steve Cheetham (Porsche Boxster)	Andrew Lightstead / Imran Khan (BMW 330)

===== Championship points =====
Position	Class A	Class B	Class C
1st	Joe Taylor (Lotus Elise) - 70	Steve Cheetham (Porsche Boxster) - 89	Andrew Lightstead / Imran Khan (BMW 330i) - 87
2nd	Rob Baker / Carl Swift (Honda Civic / Seat Leon) - 66	Gavin Johnson / Pip Hammond (Porsche Boxster) - 60	Darren Kell / James Kell (Mazda MX5) - 71
3rd	Luke Sedzikowski / David Whitmore (BMW M4) - 64	Luke Handley (Honda Civic) - 52	John Munro / Nick Dougill (Mazda MX5) – 57
4th	John Gardner / Paul Huxley / Rob Smith (Seat Supercopa) - 44	Michael Downie (Porsche Boxster) - 44	Ivor Mairs / Andy Waters / Phil Dryburgh (BMW 330i) - 38
5th	Michael Price / Callum MacLeod / Marcus Clutton (Porsche Cayman) - 39	Ben Salmon / Nick Starkey / Matt Maxted (BMW M3) – 43	Paul Sheard / Steve Dolman (Mazda MX5) – 33
6th	Darren Ball (BMW M3) – 39	Peter Mansfield / Rob Boston (Lotus Elise) - 32	Geoffrey Gouriet / Russel Tamplin (Mazda MX5) - 32
7th	Will Ashmore / Matty Taylor (BMW Compact / Honda Civic) - 37	Wiliam Beech / Adam Morgan / David Vincent / Chris Coomer (Renault Clio) - 27	Graham Kelly (BMW 325i) - 31
8th	Chris Brown / Mika Brown (BMW M4) - 36	Andy Baylie / Luke Schlewitz (Volkswagen Golf) - 27	Sam McKee / Adam Mealand (BMW 328i) - 31
9th	Rory Hinde / Owen Fitzgerald (BMW M3) - 36	Jon La Master / Greg Denman (Lotus Elise) - 27	Philip Nagel / Darren Anderson / Adrian Ferdinands (BMW Compact) - 27
10th	Matthew Wallis / Simon Wallis (Seat Leon) - 28	Mark Lloyd-Jones / Alistair Lindsay / George Haynes (Honda Civic) - 25	Alec Livesley / Justin Newman (Mazda MX5) – 25

==== 2020 season ====
===== Results =====
Round	Race winner	2nd place	3rd place	Class A winner	Class B winner	Class C winner
Silverstone 100 minutes	Carl Swift / Rob Baker (Seat Leon)	Rory Hinde / Owen Fitzgerald (BMW M3	Kevin Dengate (BMW M3)	Carl Swift / Rob Baker (Seat Leon)	Colin Gillespie (BMW 135i)	Andy Baylie (Honda Civic)
Oulton Park 2 Hours	Alan Henderson (Lotus Elise)	Carl Swift / Rob Baker (Seat Leon)	Matthew Saunders / Jack Leighton (BMW M3)	Carl Swift / Rob Baker (Seat Leon)	William Beech / Mark Grice (Volkswagen Golf)	James Kell / Darren Kell (Mazda MX5)
Snetterton 2 Hours	Carl Swift / Rob Baker (Seat Leon)	Matthew Wallis / Simon Wallis (Seat Leon)	Matthew Hampson / Andy Schulz (BMW M3)	Carl Swift / Rob Baker (Seat Leon)	Luke Handley (Honda Civic)	James Kell / Darren Kell (Mazda MX5)
Donington Park 100 minutes	Carl Swift / Rob Baker (Seat Leon)	Mark Jones / Tony Rodgers (Seat Leon)	Darren Ball (Porsche Cayman)	Carl Swift / Rob Baker (Seat Leon)	Chris Coomer (Renault Clio)	Jonathan Packer (Honda Civic)

===== Championship points =====
Position	Class A	Class B	Class C
1st	Rob Baker / Carl Swift (Seat Leon) - 59	Luke Handley (Volkswagen Golf) - 42	James Kell / Darren Kell / Alec Livesley (Mazda MX5) - 49
2nd	Matthew Wallis / Simon Wallis (Seat Leon) - 36	Chris Freeman / Jonny Munday (Honda Civic) - 41	Andy Baylie (Honda Civic) - 41
3rd	Matthew Hampson / Andy Schulz (BMW M3) - 26	Colin Gillespie (BMW 135i) - 34	John Munro / Nick Dougill (Mazda MX5) – 27
4th	Steve Cheetham (Porsche Boxster) - 25	William Beech / Mark Grice (Volkswagen Golf) - 19	Matthew Tidmarsh / Alex Richardson (Mazda MX5) - 26
5th	Darren Ball (Porsche Cayman) - 23	Tom Rodgers / John Griffiths (Honda Civic) - 19	Ivor Mairs (Mazda MX5) - 24
6th	Alan Henderson / Daniel Jude / Alex Ball (Lotus Elise) - 17	Michael Downie (Porsche Boxster) - 19	Paul Sheard / Chrissy Palmer / Steve Dolman (Mazda MX5) - 20
7th	Jamie Ingram (BMW M3) - 15	Steven Lake (Lotus Elise) - 17	Jonathan Hayes / Paul Subbinai (BMW Compact) - 18
8th	Rory Hinde / Owen Fitzgerald (BMW M3) - 13	Chris Coomer (Renault Clio) - 15	Jeremy Crook / Clive Chisnall / Alec Livesley (Honda Civic) - 17
9th	Mark Jones / Tony Rodgers (Seat Leon) - 13	John Mawdsley / Stuart Mead (Volkswagen Golf) - 15	Jonathan Packer (Honda Civic) - 16
10th	Manoj Patel (Honda Civic) - 13	Ben Short / Ben Hancy (Mazda MX5) - 14	Brian Chandler / Clive Chisnall (Mazda MX5) – 12

==== 2021 season ====
===== Results =====
Round	Race winner	2nd place	3rd place	Class A winner	Class B winner	Class C winner
Donington Park (2 Hours)	Rob Baker / Carl Swift (Seat Leon)	Adam Howarth / Chris Boardman (BMW M3)	Jonathan Beeson / George Heler (Seat Cupra)	Rob Baker / Carl Swift (Seat Leon)	William Stacey (Lotus Elise)	Jeremy Crook / Alex Livesley (Honda Civic)
Croft (2 Hours)	Rob Baker / Carl Swift (Seat Leon)	Steve Cheetham (Porsche Boxster)	William Casswell / Brad Kaylor (Seat Cupra)	Rob Baker / Carl Swift (Seat Leon)	Luke Handley (Volkswagen Golf)	Jeremy Crook / Alex Livesley (Honda Civic)
Brands Hatch (125 minutes)	Rob Baker / Carl Swift (Seat Leon)	Joe Lock / Ashley Hicklin (BMW M3 GTR)	William Casswell / Brad Kaylor (Seat Cupra)	Rob Baker / Carl Swift (Seat Leon)	Phil Dryburgh (Porsche Boxster)	Alex Miller / John Langridge (Mazda MX5)
Snetterton (125 minutes)	Rob Baker / Carl Swift (Seat Leon)	Alan Henderson (Lotus Elise)	Matthew Hampson / Andy Schulz (BMW M3)	Rob Baker / Carl Swift (Seat Leon)	Luke Handley (Volkswagen Golf)	Alex Miller / John Langridge (Mazda MX5)
Silverstone (100 minutes)	Joe Lock / Ashley Hicklin (BMW M3 GTR)	Andy Marston (BMW M3)	Rob Baker / Carl Swift (Seat Leon)	Joe Lock / Ashley Hicklin (BMW M3 GTR)	William Stacey (Lotus Elise)	Alex Miller / John Langridge (Mazda MX5)
Oulton Park (2 Hours)	Rob Baker / Carl Swift (Seat Leon)	Jonathan Beeson / George Heler (Seat Cupra)	William Casswell / Brad Kaylor (Seat Cupra)	Rob Baker / Carl Swift (Seat Leon)	Steve Hewson (Paul Ivens (Porsche Cayman)	Jonathan Packer (Honda Civic)

===== Championship points =====
Position	Class A	Class B	Class C
1st	Rob Baker / Carl Swift (Seat Leon) - 61	Luke Handley (Volkswagen Golf) - 51	Alex Miller / John Langridge (Mazda MX5) - 54
2nd	William Casswell / Brad Kaylor (Seat Leon) - 39	William Stacey (Lotus Elise) - 44	Matthew Tidmarsh / Chris Webster (Mazda MX5) - 46
3rd	Matthew Hampson / Andy Schulz (BMW M3) - 31	Phil Dryburgh (Porsche Boxster) - 43	Rory Baptiste / Tim Hartland (BMW 330i) - 42
4th	Steve Cheetham (Porsche Boxster) - 30	William Beech / Mark Grice (Volkswagen Golf) - 40	Jonathan Hayes / Paul Subbiani (BMW Compact) - 34
5th	Joe Lock / Ashley Hicklin (BMW M3 GTR) - 29	John Mawdsley / Stuart Mead (Volkswagen Golf) - 32	Ivor Mairs (Mazda MX5) - 33
6th	Paul Browes / Luke Browes (BMW M3 GTR) - 26	Chris Freeman / Jonathan Munday - 32	Jeremy Crook / Alec Livesley (Honda Civic) - 32
7th	Michael Dark / Charlie Dark / David Heasman / Sammy Veneables (BMW M235i) - 23	Colin Gillespie (Porsche Cayman) - 31	Nick Dougill / John Munro (Mazda MX5) - 29
8th	Matthew Wallis / Simon Wallis (Seat Leon) - 22	Michael Downie (Porsche Boxster) - 29	Darren Kell / James Kell (Mazda MX5) - 29
9th	Alan Henderson (Lotus Elise) - 22	James Alford / Mark Lloyd-Jones - 28	Jonathan Barrett (BMW 330i) - 23
10th	Jonathan Beeson / George Heler (Seat Leon) - 22	Andy Baylie / Lee Deegan (Honda Civic) - 27	Roan Lundy / Richard Lundy (Toyota Celica) - 18

==== 2022 season ====
===== Results =====
Round	Race winner	2nd place	3rd place	Class A winner	Class B winner	Class C winner	Clubman Cup winner
Donington Park (2 Hours)	Carl Swift (Seat Leon)	Andy Marston (BMW M3)	Steven Laidlaw / Sam Laidlaw (Seat Leon)	Rob Baker / Carl Swift (Seat Leon)	Jonathan Packer (Volkswagen Golf)	Jonathan Hayes / Paul Subbiani (BMW 318 Ti)	Steve Cheetham (Porsche Boxster)
Croft (125 minutes)	William Stacey (Lotus Elise)	Colin Gillespie (Seat Leon)	Carl Swift (Seat Leon)	William Stacey (Lotus Elise)	Luke Handley (Volkswagen Golf)	Joel Oswick / Dan Ausano (BMW 328i)	Phil Dryburgh (Porsche Boxster)
Spa-Francorchamps (2x 100 minutes)	Rob Baker / Carl Swift (Seat Leon)	William Stacey (Lotuse Elise)	James Ramsden / Ben Rushworth (Seat Leon)	Rob Baker / Carl Swift (Seat Leon)	Luke Handley (Volkswagen Golf)	Jonathan Hayes / Paul Subbiani (BMW 318 Ti)	David Gooding / Nigel Greensall (BMW M3)
Snetterton (3 Hours)	Rob Baker / Carl Swift (Seat Leon)	Andy Marston / Brett Evans (BMW M3)	William Beech / Mark Grice (Audi RS3)	Rob Baker / Carl Swift (Seat Leon)	Chris Freeman (Volkswagen Golf)	Joel Oswick / Dan Ausano (BMW 328i)	John Mawdsley / Stuart Mead (Volkswagen Scirocco)
Silverstone (125 minutes)	Rob Baker / Carl Swift (Seat Leon)	James Ramsden / Ben Rushworth (Seat Leon)	Colin Gillespie / Phil Dryburgh (Seat Leon)	Rob Baker / Carl Swift (Seat Leon)	Chris Freeman (Volkswagen Golf)	Joel Oswick / Dan Ausano (BMW 328i)	Lewis Rose / Aaron Rose (Honda Civic)
Anglesey (125 minutes)	Rob Baker / Carl Swift (Seat Leon)	Rob Boston (Lotus Elise)	Scott Parkin (Volkswagen Golf)	Rob Baker / Carl Swift (Seat Leon)	Rob Boston (Lotus Elise)	Joel Oswick / Dan Ausano (BMW 328i)	Rob Boston (Lotus Elise)
Oulton Park (2 Hours)	Bruno Costa / Paul Curran (Volkswagen Golf)	Kevin Clarke / Aldo Riti (BMW M3 CSL)	Colin Gillespie / Phil Dryburgh (Seat Leon)	Kevin Clarke / Aldo Riti (BMW M3 CSL)	Scott Parkin (Volkswagen Golf)	Jonathan Hayes / Paul Subbiani (BMW 318 Ti)	Steve Cheetham (Porsche Boxster)

===== Championship points =====
Position	Class A	Class B	Class C	Clubman Cup
1st	Rob Baker / Carl Swift (Seat Leon) - 78	Luke Handley (Volkswagen Golf) - 63	Dan Ausano / Joel Oswick (BMW 328i) - 75	Matty Taylor / Will Ashmore (Holden Commodore) - 46
2nd	Colin Gillespie / Phil Dryburgh (Seat Leon) - 52	Scott Parkin / Ryan Parkin (Volkswagen Golf) - 56	Jonathan Hayes / Paul Subbiani (BMW Compact) - 62	David Gooding / Nigel Greensall (BMW M3) - 40
3rd	James Ramsden / Ben Rushworth / William Casswell (Seat Leon) - 49	Jonathan Packer (Volkswagen Golf) - 54	Rory Baptiste / Tim Hartland / Mark Lloyd-Jones (BMW 330i) - 55	Dan Ausano / Joel Oswick (BMW 328i) - 40
4th	Will Stacey / Rob Boston (Lotus Elise) - 36	Steve Hewson / Matt Faizey (Porsche Cayman) - 54	Nick Dougill / John Munro (Mazda MX5) - 46	Jonathan Hayes / Paul Subbinani (BMW Compact) - 39
5th	Phil Knibb / Andrew Rath (Seat Leon) - 36	Chris Freeman (Volkswagen Golf) - 45	David Connell / David Nolan (Mazda MX5) - 22	Michael Downie (Porsche Boxster) - 37
6th	Matthew Hampson / Andy Schulz (BMW M3) - 27	Matthew Tidmarsh / Chris Webster (Ginetta G40) - 34	Neville Jonese / Christopher Jones / Matthew George (Mini Cooper) - 17	Lewis Rose / Aaron Rose (Honda Civic) - 35
7th	Andy Marston / Brett Evans (BMW M3) - 26	Lewis Rose / Aaron Rose (Honda Civic) - 29	Graham Kelly (BMW 325i) - 13	Steve Cheetham (Porsche Boxster) - 32
8th	Martin Gadsby / Ian Jones (BMW Compact) - 23	Michael Downie (Porsche Boxster) - 28	Joseph Ritchie / Mike Nash / Paul Sheard / Joseph Marshall (Mazda MX5) - 10	Nick Dougill / John Munro (Mazda MX5) - 28
9th	Paul Browes / Luke Browes (BMW M3) - 22	Christopher Plaskett (Volkswagen Golf) - 21	Sarah Dennis / James Millar (Renault Clio) - 9	Rory Baptiste / Tim Hartland / Mark Lloyd-Jones (BMW 330i) - 26
10th	David Gooding / Nigel Greensall (BMW M3) - 20	Robert Fenwick / Andy Shepherd / Andrew Howard (Lotus Elise) - 20	Roan Lundy / Richard Lundy / Ethan Lundy (Mazda MX5) - 9	Reece Lycett / Steve Brockington (Lotus Elise) - 21

==== 2023 season ====
===== Results =====
Round	Race winner	2nd place	3rd place	Class A winner	Class B winner	Class C winner	Clubman Cup winner
Croft (2 Hours)	William Stacey (Lotus Elise)	Mark Grice / William Beech (Seat Cupra)	Robert Baker / Carl Swift (Volkswagen Golf)	William Stacey (Lotus Elise)	Scott Parkin (Volkswagen Golf)	David Lawrence / Ilya Krylov (Honda Civic)	Steve Cheetham (Porsche Boxster)
Anglesey (2 Hours)	William Stacey / Rob Boston (Lotus Elise)	Robert Baker / Carl Swift (Volkswagen Golf)	Colin Gillespie / Phil Dryburgh (Seat Cupra)	William Stacey / Rob Boston (Lotus Elise)	Christopher Plaskett (Volkswagen Golf)	David Lawrence / Mike Sanford (Honda Civic)	Michael Downie (Porsche Boxster)
Oulton Park (2 Hours)	Mark Grice / William Beech (Seat Cupra)	Colin Gillespie / Phil Dryburgh (Seat Cupra)	Joel Oswick (BMW M4)	Mark Grice / William Beech (Seat Cupra)	Luke Schlewitz / Kevin Glover (Volkswagen Golf)	David Lawrence (Honda Civic)	Peter Mansfield / Mike Sanford (Lotus Elise)
Spa-Francorchamps (2x 100 minutes)	Luke Sargeant / Josh Files (Hyundai Elantra)	Ryan Parkin / Dylan Brychta (Audi TT)	Joel Oswick / Jay Dalgarno (BMW M4)	Ryan Parkin / Dylan Brychta (Audi TT)	Scott Parkin (Volkswagen Golf)	Martin Schiele (BMW 325i)	n/a
Snetterton (2 Hours)	Robert Baker / Bradley Burns (Volkswagen Golf)	Mark Grice / William Beech (Seat Cupra)	Daniel Silvester / Aaron Cooke (Audi RS3)	Robert Baker / Bradley Burns (Volkswagen Golf)	Scott Parkin (Volkswagen Golf)	Jonathan Hayes / Paul Subbiani (BMW 318 Ti)	Peter Mansfield / Mike Sanford (Lotus Elise)
Donington Park (2 Hours)	William Stacey / Rob Boston (Lotus Elise)	Robert Baker / Bradley Burns (Volkswagen Golf)	Joel Oswick (BMW M4)	William Stacey / Rob Boston (Lotus Elise)	Scott Parkin (Volkswagen Golf)	Kale Keltz (BMW 328i)	Manoj Patel / Tom Gannon (Honda Civic)
Silverstone (100 minutes)	Robert Baker / Bradley Burns (Volkswagen Golf)	Mark Grice / William Beech (Seat Cupra)	Daniel Irving / Alan Henderson (Mazda MX5)	Robert Baker / Bradley Burns (Volkswagen Golf)	Luke Schlewitz / Kevin Glover (Volkswagen Golf)	David Lawrence (Honda Civic)	David Griffin (BMW E36 M3)

===== Championship points =====
Position	Class A	Class B	Class C	Clubman Cup
1st	Robert Baker / Carl Swift / Bradley Burns (Volkswagen Golf) - 65	Scott Parkin / Daniel Silvester (Volkswagen Golf) - 75	David Lawrence / Ilya Krylov / Michael Sanford (Honda Civic) - 62	Peter Mansfield / Mike Sanford (Lotus Elise) - 51
2nd	Will Stacey / Rob Boston - 59	Luke Schlewitz / Kevin Glover (Volkswagen Golf) - 68	Robert Fenwick / Andrew Shepherd (Ginetta G40) - 46	Michael Downie (Porsche Boxster) - 50
3rd	Will Beech / Mark Grice (Seat Cupra) - 59	Christopher Plaskett (Volkswagen Golf) - 49	Jonathan Hayes / Paul Subbiani (BMW Compact) - 44	Nik Grove / Carlo Turner (BMW 130i) - 41
4th	Joel Oswick / Jay Dalgarno (46)	Matthew Tidmarsh / Chris Webster (Ginetta G40 - 47	Tomos Steadman / Michael Hooper (Mazda MX5) - 33	Edward Christie (BMW M3) - 32
5th	Colin Gillespie / Phil Dryburgh / Bruno Costa (Seat Cupra) - 46	Joe Williams (Volkswagen Golf) - 42	Vytaytas Pipiras (Honda Civic) - 33	Magdalena King / Amy Riley / Dan Jude / Mike Rayner (Lotus Elise) - 31
6th	Ryan Parkin / Daniel Silvester / Dylan Brychta / Aaron Cooke (Audi TT) - 36	Ben Short / Ben Hancy / Stewart Mutch (Mazda MX5) - 32	Matthew Bawtree / James Johnson (Honda Civic) - 26	Manoj Patel / Tom Gannon (Honda Civic) - 26
7th	James Collins / Nigel Greensall / Daniel Silvester / Brett Lidsey (BMW M3) - 33	Michael Downie (Porsche Boxster) - 28	Jon Peerless / Matthew Stenning (Honda Civic) - 21	David Griffin (BMW M3) - 18
8th	Matthew Stockford / Alyn James (Audi RS3) - 32	Peter Mansfield / Mike Sanford (Lotus Elise) - 26	Joseph Ritchie / Kale Keltz (BMW E36) - 15	Steve Cheetham (Porsche Boxster) - 16
9th	Phil Knibb / Andrew Rath (Seat Leon) - 27	Nik Grove / Carlo Turner (BMW 130i) - 24	Iain Thornton / Keith Fryer (Honda Civic) - 12	Lewis Rose / Aaron Rose (Honda Civic) - 11
10th	Ben Williams / Colin Gillespie / Luke Handley / Darren Ball (Seat Cupra) - 27	Manoj Patel / Tom Gannon (Honda Civic) - 18	Sam McKee / Alex Baldwin (BMW 328i) - 10	Dan Ausano / Charlie Dark (Honda S2000) - 9

=== F1000 ===
The championship previously known as Formula Jedi joined the 750 Motor Club in 2019, and has established itself as the premier bike-engined, single-seater category in the UK, which provides some of the fastest lap times in the country. Using a proven ‘slicks and wings’ racing car with excellent handling characteristics and powered by a 1000 cc high performance motorbike engine, the cars reach 60 mph in 3 seconds and go on to 150 mph, while revving to around 14000 rpm.

==== Championship results ====
Year	Champion	2nd	3rd	4th	5th
2025	Matthew Higginson	Craig Pollard	Robert Welham	James Clennell	Thomas Westworth
2024	Craig Pollard	Tom Gadd	Robert Welham	Matthew Higginson	Chaz Highton
2023	Tom Gadd	Robert Welham	Matthew Higginson	Dan Gore	Murfie Aldridge
2022	Robert Welham	Matthew Booth	Tom Gadd	Lee Morgan	Matthew Higginson
2021	Lee Morgan	Matthew Booth	Robert Welham	Dan Gore	Elliot Mitchell
2020	Dan Clowes	Matthew Booth	Jack Tomalin	Lee Morgan	Elliot Mitchell
2019	Matthew Booth	Dan Clowes	Lee Morgan	Dan Gore	Paul Butcher
2018	Michael Watton	Dan Clowes	Adam Walker	Alok Ayengar	Paul Butcher
2017	Michael Watton	Paul Butcher	Robert Sayell	Dan Clowes	Adam Walker
2016	Robert Sayell	Paul Butcher	Bradley Hobday	Dan Clowes	Lee Morgan
2015	Ben Hingeley	Lee Morgan	Michael Watton	Paul Butcher	Dan Clowes
2014	Jack Lang	Andrew Dunn	Paul Butcher	Dan Clowes	Michael Watton
2013	Lee Morgan	Scott Stevens	Jack Lang	James Maclachlan	Richard Gittings
2012	Richard Mitcham	Matthew Bett	Lee Morgan	Barry Armstrong	Alok Iyengar
2011	Richard Mitcham	James Fletcher	Dan Cook	Dan Clowes	Barry Armstrong
2010	Andrew Dunn	Richard Gittings	Jack Smith	Richard Mitcham	Barry Armstrong
2009	Richard Mitcham	Jack Smith	Stuart Abbott	Daniel Cook	Andrew Ward

=== Formula Vee Championship ===
The most cost-effective introduction into single-seater racing; Formula Vee cars utilise 1,300 cc (79.3 cu in) Volkswagen Beetle components, in single-seater chassis – often converted from Formula Ford units.

==== Championship results ====
Year	Champion	2nd	3rd	Class B winner
2025	Matt Harbot (AHS Dominator)	Leon Frost (AHS Dominator)	John Hughes (Scarab Mk5)	Simon Foley (Maverick Evo)
2024	Matt Harbot (AHS Dominator)	Craig Bell (AHS Dominator)	Vaughan Jones (Storm)	Bill Garner (Maverick KE01)
2023	Matthew Hyde (AHS Dominator)	Craig Bell (AHS Dominator)	Vaughan Jones (Storm)	Matt Topham (AHS Challenger)
2022	Craig Pollard (WEV)	Daniel Hands (AHS Dominator)	Vaughan Jones (Storm)	James Huckle (Sheane Mk1)
2021	James Harridge (Maverick)	Daniel Hands (AHS Dominator)	Craig Pollard (Bears GAC)	James Harridge (Maverick)
2020	James Harridge (Maverick)	Daniel Hands (GAC)	Ian Buxton (GAC Daghorn)	James Harridge (Maverick)
2019	Graham Gant (WEV)	Daniel Hands (GAC)	Ian Jordan (Sheane Jordan)	Jack Wilkinson (Sheane Mk3)
2018	Craig Pollard (Bears GAC)	Daniel Hands (GAC)	Graham Gant (WEV)	Andrew Cooper (AHS Challenger)
2017	Ben Miloudi (Storm)	Adam Macaulay (Sheane)	Craig Pollard (Bears GAC)	Jamie Harrison (Sheane Jordan)
2016	Paul Smith (AHS Dominator)	Ian Buxton (GAC/Daghorn)	Ian Jordan (Sheane Jordan)	James Harridge (Maverick)
2015	Paul Smith (AHS Dominator)	Ian Jordan (Sheane Jordan)	Craig Pollard (Bears GAC)	Jack Wilkinson (Sheane Mk3)
2014	Martin Farmer (GAC)	Ian Jordan (Sheane Jordan)	Paul Taylor (GAC)	Sam Engineer (Sheane)
2013	Paul Smith (AHS Dominator)	Martin Farmer (GAC)	Graham Gant (WEV)	Ian Jordan (Sheane Jordan)
2012	Paul Smith (AHS Dominator)	Sam Oliveria (Sheane)	Jake Oliveria (Storm)	Ian Jordan (Sheane Jordan)
2011	Martin Farmer (GAC)	Michael Epps (GAC)	John Hughes (Scarab Mk5)	Ian Jordan (Sheane Jordan)
2010	Martin Farmer (GAC)	Ben Anderson (GAC)	Peter Belsey (Spyder Mk2)	Ian Jordan (Sheane Jordan)
2009	Sam Oliveria (Sheane)	John Hughes (Scarab Mk5)	Martin Farmer (GAC)	Robert Cowburn Sheane)
2008	Daniel Hands (GAC)	Paul Smith (GAC)	John Hughes (Scarab Mk5)	Tim Hill
2007	Martin Galpin (GAC 01)	Martin Farmer (GAC)	Daniel Hands (GAC)	-
2006	Sam Oliveria (Sheane)	Jake Oliveria (Storm)	Daniel Hands (GAC)	-

=== Historic 750 Formula ===
This is a historic racing series catering for the previous two generations of 750 Formula cars, such as Austin Seven specials and Reliant-engined models, plus other small capacity racers 500 cc (30.5 cu in) Formula 3 cars, amongst others.

=== Hot Hatch Championship ===
A formula for almost any naturally aspirated 2WD hatchback or hatchback-coupe. Re-launched in 2016 to follow on from the original, but now with power-to-weight rather than capacity class limits to ensure costs are tightly controlled.

Class rules were updated for 2021.

- Class A: Up to 200 bhp/tonne (power at flywheel, weight with driver).
- Class B: Up to 175 bhp/tonne (power at flywheel, weight with driver).
- Class C: Up to 145 bhp/tonne (power at flywheel, weight with driver).

==== Championship results ====
Year	1st	2nd	3rd	Class A winner	Class B winner	Class C winner
2024	Joshua Hilton (BMW Compact)	Paul Warren (BMW Compact)	Liam Pauling (Renault Clio)	Shay Kavanagh (Honda Civic)	Liam Pauling (Renault Clio)	Joshua Hilton (BMW Compact)
2023	David Drinkwater (BMW Compact)	Martyn Paget (Citroen Saxo)	Daniel Silvester (Honda Civic)	Daniel Silvester (Honda Civic)	Matthew Mandipira (Renault Clio 197)	David Drinkwater (BMW Compact)
2022	David Drinkwater (BMW Compact)	Philip Wright (Honda Civic)	Paul Jarvis (Citroen Saxo)	Philip Wright (Honda Civic)	Paul Jarvis (Citroen Saxo)	David Drinkwater (BMW Compact)
2021	David Drinkwater (BMW Compact)	Alistair Camp (Honda Civic)	Philip Wright (Honda Civic)	Alistair Camp (Honda Civic)	Neil Stringfellow (Peugeot 205)	David Drinkwater (BMW Compact)
2020	David Drinkwater (BMW Compact)	Tony Perfect (Honda Civic)	Philip Wright (Honda Civic)	Gary Prebble (Honda Civic)	Tony Perfect (Honda Civic)	David Drinkwater (BMW Compact)
2019	David Drinkwater (BMW Compact)	Ben Rushworth (Honda Integra)	Martin Ward (Honda Civic)	Ben Rushworth (Honda Integra)	Martin Ward (Honda Civic)	David Drinkwater (BMW Compact)
2018	Michael Winkworth (Citroen Saxo)	Rodren Vella (Honda Civic)	Philip Wright (Honda Civic)	Ben Rushworth (Honda Integra)	Rodren Vella (Honda Civic)	Michael Winkworth (Citroen Saxo)
2017	Paul Jarvis (Citroen Saxo)	Alistair Camp (Ford Fiesta)	Ben Rushworth (Honda Integra)	Alistair Camp (Ford Fiesta)	Will Hunt (Citroen Saxo)	Paul Jarvis (Citroen Saxo)

=== Locost Championship ===
A one-make championship for the DIY sports car Locost using the design from Ron Champion's book "Build Your Own Sports Car" . All cars use the 1,300 cc (79.3 cu in) Ford Crossflow engine mated to a 4-speed Escort or 4/5-speed Sierra Type 9 gearbox.

==== Championship results ====
Year	Champion	2nd	3rd	4th	5th	6th
2025	Daniel Garrett	Lewis Ward	Jack Lynas	Shaun Brame	Ryan Garrett	Paul Clark
2024	Daniel Garrett	Lee Emm	Shaun Brame	Geoff Peek	Paul Clark	Martin West
2023	Craig Land	Tom Parker	Todd Boucher	Jack Lynas	David Martin	David Hitchin
2022	Craig Land	Martin West	Karl Ruijsenaars	David Martin	Rob Apsey	Bradley Horsnell
2021	Martin West	Andrew Tait	Geoff Peek	Craig Land	Paul Clark	Shaun Brame
2020	Murray Shepherd	Craig Land	Geoff Peek	Andrew Tait	Martin West	Thomas Gadd
2019	Thomas Gadd	Louis Wall	Murray Shepherd	Martin West	Mark Burton	David Mason
2018	Mark Burton	Martin West	Ben Powney	Louis Wall	Thomas Gadd	David Winter
2017	Ian Allee	Jack Coveney	Ben Powney	Martin West	Lee Emm	Steve Paddock
2016	Ian Allee	Jack Coveney	Danny Andrew	Martin West	Tim Neat	Ben Powney
2015	Danny Andrew	Ian Allee	Tim Neat	Stuart Sellars	Roger Haylock	Jack Coveney
2014	Mathew Brooks	Lee Bankhurst	Danny Andrew	Tom Coller	Thomas Robinson	Ian Allee
2013	Alastair Garratt	Lee Bankhurst	Richard Jenkins	Danny Andrew	Paul Bryant	Tim Neat
2012	Michael Comber	Stuart Sellars	Alistair Garratt	Nick Selby	Alex Von Ehrheim	Sian Stafford-Atkinson
2011	Scott Mittell	Nicolas Morley	Alex Von Ehrheim	Richard Jenkins	Sam Bradley	Lee McNamara
2010	Scott Mittell	David Black	Tom Coller	Alex Von Ehrheim	Nicolas Morley	Lynfel Owen
2009	David Bartholomew	Scott Mittell	Alistair Garratt	Tom Coller	Matt Cherrington	Richard Jenkins
2008	David Bartholomew	Declan McDonnell	Alistair Garratt	Scott Mittell	Simon Wood	Richard Jenkins
2007	Declan McDonnell	Aaron Bailey	Richard Jenkins	Alistair Garratt	David Bartholomew	Mark Glover
2006	Declan McDonnell	Brendan Dudley	Brian Mitcham	Jamie Robinson	Lee Baverstock	Kevin Lucas

=== Ma7da Locost ===
New in 2019, Ma7da Locost is an offshoot of the popular Locost Championship for kit cars designed to the original Ron Champion ‘Build Your Own Sports Car’ book dimensions but featuring a 1.8-litre Mazda MX-5 engine.

==== Championship results ====
Year	Champion	2nd	3rd	4th	5th	6th
2025	Martin West	Tom Coller	Craig Land	David Bowen	Lucas Batt	Martin Shelton
2024	Ben Powney	Craig Land	Martin West	Martin Shelton	David Bowen	Benjamin Dade
2023	Jonathan Lisseter	Ben Powney	Martin Shelton	Lucas Batt	David Bowen	Ayrton Rogers
2022	Jonathan Lisseter	Danny Andrew	Eddie Mawer	Daniel Cort	David Winter	Simon Cort
2021	Danny Andrew	Ben Powney	Daniel Sibbons	David Winter	Jonathan Lisseter	Simon Cort

=== MR2 Championship ===
A one-make championship for Toyota MR2 sports cars. There are two titles at stake for each driver, one for the overall results and one for the different classes:

- Class A: First-generation Toyota MR2s, fitted with the Toyota 4A-GE engine.
- Class B: Second-generation Toyota MR2s, fitted with the Toyota 3S-GE engine.
- Class C: Third-generation Toyota MR2s (and MR-S), fitted with the Toyota 1ZZ-FE engine.

==== Championship results ====
Year	Champion	2nd	3rd	Class A champion	Class B champion	Class C champion
2023	Adam Lockwood	Shaun Traynor	Neil Stratton	Martin Collins	Daniel Silvester	Adam Lockwood
2022	Aaron Cooke	Shaun Traynor	Alistair Topley	Dave Hemingway	Alistair Topley	Aaron Cooke
2021	Aaron Cooke	Shaun Traynor	Cam Walton	Gareth Baxter	Cam Walton	Aaron Cooke
2020	Aaron Cooke	Shaun Traynor	Paul Cook	Dave Hemingway	Aaron Cooke	Shaun Traynor
2019	Shaun Traynor	Alistair Topley	Aaron Cooke	Dave Hemingway	Shaun Traynor	Adam Lockwood
2018	Shaun Traynor	Ben Rowe	Chris Thomas	Adam Lockwood	Shaun Traynor	Graham Malings
2017	Shaun Traynor	Lewis Ward	Ben Rowe	Paul Callaway	Shaun Traynor	William Gallacher
2016	Jim Davies	Kristian White	Shaun Traynor	Paul Callaway	Jim Davies	Stuart Nicholls
2015	Shaun Traynor	Kristian White	Stuart Nicholls	n/a	Shaun Traynor	Stuart Nicholls
2014	Matt Palmer	Jim Davies	Stuart Nicholls	n/a	Matt Palmer	Jim Davies
2013	Matt Palmer	Stuart Nicholls	John Wilson	n/a	Matt Palmer	Stuart Nicholls
2012	Paul Hinson	George Robinson	Matt Palmer	Darren Cox	Paul Hinson	Jim Davies
2011	James Cross	Paul Hinson	Roland Wilkinson	Nina Fountain	James Cross	Simon Phillips
2010	Zac Chapman	Steve Lumley	Andrei Bgatov	n/a	Zac Chapman	Jonathan Grimes
2009	Mark Jessop	Zac Champman	Andrei Bgatov	Jonathan Grimes	Mark Jessop	Roland Woolley
2008	Mark Jessop	Steve Lumley	Alric Kitson	Arthur Gilmour	Mark Jessop	n/a

=== MX-5 Cup ===
5 Club Racing was formed in 2014 and joined the 750 Motor Club to run the MX5 Cup for Mk1 Mazda MX5s. The series became a championship in 2015.

==== Championship results ====
Year	Champion	2nd	3rd	4th	5th	6th
2023	Jordan Johnson	Ben Hancy	Oak Richardson	Scott Leach	Ian Tomlinson	Lloyd Huggins
2022	Ben Short	Ben Abbitt	Ben Hancy	Jordan Johnson	Matthew Hallam	Ian Tomlinson
2021	Ben Short	Ben Hancy	Ben Abbitt	Marcus Bailey	Jordan Johnson	Ian Tomlinson
2020	Ben Hancy	Steve Foden	Tom Smith	Jason Greatrex	Callum Greatrex	Marcus Bailey
2019	Ben Hancy	Ian Tomlinson	Jordan Johnson	Paul Bateman	Graeme Chatten	Adrian Johnson
2018	Paul Maguire	Ben Hancy	Ian Tomlinson	Rafal Drzaszcz	Matthew Short	Daniel Grist
2017	Ben Short	Alistair Bray	Paul Bateman	Ian Tomlinson	Ben Hancy	Matthew Short
2016	Will Blackwell-Chambers	Ben Short	Jack Sycamore	Sam Smith	Sam Tatler	Scott Leach
2015	Ben Short	Will Blackwell-Chambers	James Rogers	Jack Sycamore	Jason Greatrex	Kris Greatrex

=== RGB Sports 1000 Championship ===
Formerly known as simply 'RGB' (Roadgoing Bike-engined), the highly competitive championship was re-launched in 2018 to reflect what the cars had developed into over the years. Namely 'Motorsport's Most Affordable Sports-Racing Car Championship.' Cars use 1000cc motorcycle-engines but run semi-slick trackday tyres, with no wings allowed. Lap times showcase BTCC pace at most circuits.

==== Championship results ====
Year	Champion	2nd	3rd	Sporting Cup winner	Cup 200 winner
2023	Ryan Yarrow (Spire GT3S)	Dan Clowes (Mittell MC-53)	John Cutmore (Spire GT3S)	Richard Webb (MK Cup 200)	Richard Webb (MK Cup 200)

Year	Champion	2nd	3rd	Sporting Cup winner
2022	Richard Webb (Spire RGBR)	Ryan Yarrow (Spire GT3-Y)	Paul Smith (Mittell MC-53 SSRD)	Jonathan McGill (Spire GT3S)
2021	Ryan Yarrow (Spire GT3S)	Michael Roots (Mittell MC-53)	Victor Neumann (Mittell MC-53)	Colin Spicer (Spire GT3)
2020	Ryan Yarrow (Spire GT3S)	Richard Morris (Spire GT320S)	Victor Neumann (Mittell MC-53)	Jonathan McGill (Spire GT3S)
2019	Christoper Wesemael (Mittel MC-53)	Richard Morris (Spire GT3S)	Danny Andrew (Mittell MC-53)	Colin Chapman (Spire GT3)
2018	Billy Albone (Spire GT3S)	Christoper Wesemael (Mittel MC-53)	Paul Smith (Mittell MC-53)	Mark Betts (Spire GT3S)

Year	Champion	2nd	3rd	Class R winner	Class F winner
2017	Billy Albone (Spire GT3S)	Scott Mittell (Mittel MC-53)	John Cutmore (Spire GT3S)	Billy Albone (Spire GT3S)	Richard Webb (Spire GT-F)
2016	Matthew Higginson (AB Arion)	John Cutmore (Spire GT3S)	Billy Albone (Spire GT3S)	John Cutmore (Spire GT3S)	Matthew Higginson (AB Arion)
2015	Scott Mittell (Mittel MC-52B)	John Cutmore (Spire GT3)	Alistair Bouton (Spire GT3)	Scott Mittell (Mittel MC-52B)	Matthew Higginson (AB Arion)
2014	Matthew Higginson (Spire GT3)	John Cutmore (Spire GT3)	James Walker (STM Phoenix)	Matthew Higginson (Spire GT3)	James Walker (STM Phoenix)
2013	Matthew Higginson (Spire GT3)	Austen Greenway (GM1)	Paul Rickers (STM Phoenix)	Matthew Higginson (Spire GT3)	Austen Greenway (GM1)
2012	Tim Gray (Spire GT3)	Alistair Boulton (STM Phoenix)	John Cutmore (Spire GT3)	Tim Gray (Spire GT3)	Alistair Boulton (STM Phoenix)
2011	Paul Rogers (Contour)	Alistair Boulton (STM Phoenix)	Derek Jones (Fisher Fury)	Paul Rogers (Contour)	Alistair Boulton (STM Phoenix)

Year	Champion	Class A winner	Class B winner	Class C winner
2010	Alistair Boulton (STM Phoenix)	Paul Rogers (Contour)	Matthew Green (Spire GTR)	Alistair Boulton (STM Phoenix)
2009	Tim Gray	Steve Robinson	John Cutmore (Spire GTR)	Tim Gray
2008	Derek Jones (BDN S2)	Derek Jones (BDN S2)	Paul Rogers (STM Phoenix)	John Cutmore (Westfield Megablade)
2007	Derek Jones (Fisher Fury)	Gordon Griffin (T5 Mission)	Paul Rogers (STM Phoenix)	Derek Jones (Fisher Fury)
2006	Jonathan Wright (Radical SR4)	Jonathan Wright (Radical SR4)	Paul Rogers (STM Phoenix)	Tim Gray (STM Phoenix)
2005	Tim Gray (STM Phoenix)	Martin Brooks (STM Phoenix)	n/a	Tim Gray (STM Phoenix)
2004	Tim Harmer (Genesis Evo)	Tim Harmer (Genesis Evo)	Alan Bushell (Tiger B6)	Tim Gray (STM Phoenix)
2003	Andy Charsley (Sylva Striker)	n/a	n/a	n/a

=== Roadsports ===
The Roadsports series is a mini-enduro series for production-based, sports and saloon cars fitted with production engines from the same manufacturer. There are four classes, with A, B and C aligned with Club Enduro:

- Class A: Up to 300 bhp/tonne (power at flywheel, weight without driver).
- Class B: Up to 240 bhp/tonne (power at flywheel, weight without driver).
- Class C: Up to 180 bhp/tonne (power at flywheel, weight without driver).
- Class D: Up to 145 bhp/tonne (power at flywheel, weight without driver).

=== Sport Specials Championship ===
Relaunched in 2012 and previously known as the Kit Car Championship, until 2015 all cars were originally road legal, however this necessity was dropped in 2015 (see regulations) to encourage more competitors. The championship caters for all manner of kit-type cars with production car powerplants, from Caterhams, Westfields and Sylva Sports Cars to home-developed one-offs. After a class system restructure in 2017, there are two main classes, plus a third for MX150R models. in 2025 another restructure created 4 separate classes. classes A, B and D separated by power to weight, and class C specifically for MEV kit cars.

- Class A: Up to 330-350 bhp/tonne (dependent on car type, power at flywheel, weight with driver, 900kg max weight excluding driver).
- Class B: Up to 270-280 bhp/tonne (dependent on car type, power at flywheel, weight with driver, 940kg max weight excluding driver).
- Class C: For MEV Exocets only (predominantly Exocet R3)
- Class D: Up to 220-230 bhp/tonne (dependent on car type, power at flywheel, weight with driver, 940kg max weight excluding driver).

==== Championship Results ====
Year	Champion	2nd	3rd	Class A winner	Class B winner	Class C winner	Class D winner
2026	Marcus Crook (Fisher Fury)	Stewart Mutch (MEV Exocet R3)	Paul Hawker (Caterham 270R)	Anton Landon (Cyana Mk2)	Marcus Crook (Fisher Fury)	Stewart Mutch (MEV Exocet R3)	Paul Hawker (Caterham 270R)
2025	Neil Turner (Caterham 7)	Stewart Mutch (MEV MX150R)	Anton Landon (Cyana Mk2)	Anton Landon (Cyana Mk2)	Neil Turner (Caterham 7)	Stewart Mutch (MEV MX150R)	Simon Dodd (Formula 27)
2024	Stuart Thompson (MK Indy RR)	Stewart Mutch (MEV MX150R)	Andy Hiley (Chronos HR1S)	Andy Hiley (Chronos HR1S)	Stuart Thompson (MK Indy RR)	Stewart Mutch (MEV MX150R)	
2023	Neil Turner (Caterham 7)	Stewart Mutch (MEV MX150R)	Andy Hiley (Chronos HR1S)	Andy Hiley (Chronos HR1S)	Neil Turner (Caterham 7)	Stewart Mutch (MEV MX150R)	
2022	Stuart Thompson (MK Indy RR)	Stewart Mutch (MEV MX150R)	Lewis Ward (Westfield SE-Wide)	Lewis Ward (Westfield SE-Wide)	Stuart Thompson (MK Indy RR)	Stewart Mutch (MEV MX150R)	
2021	Andy Hiley (Chronos HR1S)	Warren Vessey (Fisher Fury)	Anton Landon (Cyana Mk2)	Andy Hiley (Chronos HR1S)	Warren Vessey (Fisher Fury)	Stewart Mutch (MEV MX150R)	
2020	Andy Hiley (Chronos HR1S)	Colin Benham (CB Fury)	Paul Collingwood (Eclipse SM1)	Andy Hiley (Chronos HR1S)	Colin Benham (CB Fury)	Stewart Mutch (MEV MX150R)	
2019	Andy Hiley (Chronos HR1S)	Chris Pyke (Procomp LA Gold)	David Winter (Locost VVT)	Andy Hiley (Chronos HR1S)	Chris Pyke (Procomp LA Gold)	Stewart Mutch (MEV MX150R)	
2018	Lee Emm (Locost VVT)	Leighton Norris (Rogue Xenon)	Rob Johnston (Cyana Mk2)	Rob Johnston (Cyana Mk2)	Lee Emm (Locost 7)	Sylvia Mutch (MEV MX150R)	
2017	Paul Boyd (Eclipse SM1)	Clive Hudson (Eclipse SM1)	Martin Farrelly (Rogue Xenon)	Paul Boyd (Eclipse SM1)	Martin Farrelly (Rogue Xenon)	Stewart Mutch (MEV MX150R)	
2016	Matthew Booth (MK Indy RR)	Martin Buckland (Raw Striker)	Rob Johnston (Cyana Mk2)	David Roberts (Cyana MX500R)	Martin Buckland (Raw Striker)	Matthew Booth (MK Indy RR)	
2015	Adrian Cooper (Procomp LA Gold)	Paul Boyd (Eclipse SM1)	Clive Hudson (Eclipse SM1)	Anton Landon (Cyana Mk2)	Adrian Cooper (Procomp LA Gold)	Paul Boyd (Eclipse SM1)	
2014	Paul Boyd (Eclipse SM1)	Adrian Cooper (Procomp LA Gold)	Clive Hudson (Eclipse SM1)	Paul Boyd (Eclipse SM1)	Adrian Cooper (Procomp LA Gold)	Edward Ives (Elite Pulse)	
2013	Colin Benham (STM Phoenix)	Clive Hudson (Eclipse SM1)	Paul Boyd (Eclipse SM1)	Clive Hudson (Eclipse SM1)	Colin Benham (STM Phoenix)	Wayne Rothwell (Tiger GTA)	
2012	Clive Hudson (Eclipse SM1)	David Caldecourt (Sylva Phoenix)	Stephen Lansley (Procomp LA Gold)	Clive Hudson (Eclipse SM1)	David Caldecourt (Sylva Phoenix)	Paul Taberner (Westfield SEW)	

=== Type R Trophy ===
New in 2019, a series for Honda Civic Type-R's with limited modifications.

==== Championship results ====
Year	Champion	2nd	3rd	4th	5th	6th
2023	Joe Jessup	Matt Wilkins	Daniel Chapman	Jeff Humphries	Miles Nathaniel-James	Trafford King
2022	Jake Hewlett	Chris Nylan	Joe Jessup	Matt Digby	Daniel Chapman	Chris Smith
2021	Adam Shepherd	Luke Rosewell	Mark Balmer	Lee Deegan	Jack Leese	Joe Jessup

=== 116 Trophy ===
New in 2019, a one-make endurance series for the BMW 1 Series, using donor E87 aka "Mk 1" road cars. Only changes to ECU map, tyres, dampers, and roll cage are required.

== 2014 ==
Champions:

- 750 Formula – Billy Albone
- Bikesports – Adrian Reynard
- Compact Cup – Stuart Voyce
- Classic Stock Hatch – Lee Scott
- Formula Vee – Martin Farmer
- Locost – Matthew Brooks
- MR2 Championship – Matt Palmer
- RGB – Matt Higginson
- Sport Specials – Paul Boyd
- Stock Hatch – Shayne Deegan

== 2015 ==
Champions:

- 750 Formula – David Bartholomew
- Bikesports – Tim Gray
- Classic Stock Hatch – Matt Rozier
- Clio 182 – James Bark
- Civic Cup – Adam Shepherd
- Compact Cup – Steve Roberts
- Formula Vee – Paul Smith
- Locost – Danny Andrew
- MR2 – Shaun Traynor
- MX5 Cup – Ben Short
- RGB – Scott Mittell
- Sport Specials – Adrian Cooper
- Stock Hatch – Shayne Deegan

== 2016 ==
Champions:

- 750 Formula – Robin Gearing
- Bikesports – Phil Knibb
- Classic Stock Hatch – Matt Rozier
- Clio 182 – Patrick Fletcher
- Civic Cup – Class A: David Buky, Class B: Carl Swift
- Formula Vee – Paul Smith
- Locost – Ian Allee
- MR2 – Jim Davies
- MX5 – Will Blackwell-Chambers
- RGB – Matt Higginson
- Sport Specials – Matthew Booth
- Stock Hatch – Ryan Polley

== 2017 ==
Champions:

- 750 Formula – Bill Cowley
- Bikesports – Stefano Leaney
- Classic Stock Hatch – Lee Scott
- Clio 182 – Patrick Fletcher
- Civic Cup – Class A: Lee Deegan
- Formula Vee – Ben Miloudi
- Locost – Ian Allee
- MR2 – Shaun Traynor
- MX5 – Ben Short
- RGB – Billy Albone
- Sport Specials – Paul Boyd
- Hot Hatch – Paul Jarvis
- Armed Forces Race Challenge – Paul Waterhouse
- M3 Cup – Adam Shepherd

== 2018 ==
Champions:

- 750 Formula – Mark Glover
- Armed Forces Race Challenge – Ed McKean
- Bikesports – Joe Stables
- Classic Stock Hatch – Lee Scott
- Clio 182 Championship – Patrick Fletcher
- Club Enduro – Matt Nossiter / Steve Hewson
- Formula Vee – Craig Pollard
- Hot Hatch – Michael Winkworth
- Locost – Mark Burton
- M3 Cup – Tom Coller
- MR2 Championship – Shaun Traynor
- MX5 Cup – Paul Maguire
- RGB Championship – Billy Albone
- Sports Specials – Lee Emm

== 2020 ==
Champions:

- 750 Formula – Peter Bove
- Alfa Romeo - Thomas Hill
- Bikesports – Charles Hall
- BMW Car Club Racing - Kevin Denwood
- Classic Stock Hatch – Pip Hammond
- Clio 182 Championship – Ryan Polley
- Club Enduro – Rob Baker / Carl Swfit
- F1000 - Dan Clewes
- Formula Vee – James Harridge
- Hot Hatch – David Drinkwater
- Locost – Murray Shepherd
- MR2 Championship – Aaron Cooke
- MX5 Cup – Ben Hancy
- S1000 - Ryan Yarrow
- Sports Specials – Andy Hiley

== 2021 ==
Champions:

- 750 Formula – Peter Bove
- Alfa Romeo - Barry McMahon
- Armed Forces Challenge - Jonathan Candler
- Bikesports – Leon Morrell
- BMW Car Club Racing - Ben Pearson
- Classic Stock Hatch – Ryan Morgan
- Clio 182 Championship – Jack Dwane
- Club Enduro – Rob Baker / Carl Swfit
- F1000 - Lee Morgan
- Formula Vee – James Harridge
- Hot Hatch – David Drinkwater
- Locost – Martin West
- Ma7da - Danny Andrew
- MR2 Championship – Aaron Cooke
- MX5 Cup – Ben Short
- S1000 - Ryan Yarrow
- Sports Specials – Andy Hiley
- Type R Trophy - Adam Shepherd

== 2022 ==
Champions:

- 750 Formula – Peter Bove
- Alfa Romeo - Andrew Bourke
- Armed Forces Challenge - Douglas Inglis
- Bikesports – Simon Walker-Hansell
- BMW Car Club Racing - Lee Piercey
- Classic Stock Hatch – Chris Dear
- Clio 182 Championship – Andrew Harding
- Club Enduro – Rob Baker / Carl Swfit
- F1000 - Robert Welham
- Formula Vee – Craig Pollard
- Hot Hatch – David Drinkwater
- Locost – Craig Land
- Ma7da - Jonathan Lisseter
- MR2 Championship – Aaron Cooke
- MX5 Cup – Ben Short
- S1000 - Richard Webb
- Sports Specials – Stuart Thompson
- Type R Trophy - Jake Hewlett
