= 750 Formula =

750 Formula is a British racing formula for two-seater sports cars, regulated by the 750 Motor Club. The formula is a 14-round championship, which is closely contested with grids of over 20 cars. It is the world's longest running formula.

750 Formula is a relatively low-cost race, with participation in a competitive season costing around £3,000 to £4,000 inclusive of entry fees, running costs, travel and accommodation. It is a popular outlet for amateur constructors and drivers to hone their craft.

== History ==
The formula was founded in 1949. Originally, cars were powered by the 750cc Austin Seven engine and the Seven chassis. Racing under this original formula regulations continues as a form of historic racing in the 750 Motor Club 750 Trophy Series.

Later, the Reliant engine was introduced. The 1108cc version of the Fiat FIRE engine has been used since 2003.
